= List of prime ministers of Tunisia =

The prime minister of Tunisia was the head of government of Tunisia from the creation of the office in 1759 until its abolition in 1957 with the proclamation of the republic. The office was revived in 1969 under the Republican system. There have been 44 prime ministers of Tunisia since the office came into existence in 1759.

The office existed before independence as the Monarch appoint a prime minister to be the head of government. Rejeb Khaznadar was the first prime minister in the history of Tunisia in 1759.

After the abolition of monarchy, the 1959 Constitution of Tunisia established a presidential system where the president was both the head of state and the head of government. In November 1969, President Habib Bourguiba brought back the position by appointing Bahi Ladgham to be the first prime minister under the republican system.

Before the 2011 revolution, the role of the prime minister was limited to assisting the president. With the adoption of the new constitution in 2014, the constitutional powers expanded, making the prime minister responsible of major domestic policies.

The youngest person to become prime minister was Mustapha Ben Ismail in 1878 at 28 years of age while the oldest was Beji Caid Essebsi in 2011 at 85 years of age. The term of Mohammed Aziz Bouattour (1882–1907) is the longest for a prime minister, with a period of nearly 25 years, while Zine El Abidine Ben Ali's term (1987) is the shortest with 36 days.

Three prime ministers became presidents afterwards: Habib Bourguiba, Zine El Abidine Ben Ali, and Beji Caid Essebsi.

There are currently eleven living former prime ministers. The most recent former prime minister to die is Rachid Sfar on 20 July 2023.

== List of prime ministers ==
=== Monarchy ===
No.	Portrait	Name (Birth–Death)	Term of office			Party	Election	Monarch (Bey / King)
1		Rejeb Khaznadar رجب خزندار (c. 1720–1797)	•	12 February 1759	26 May 1782	Independent	None	Ali II علي الثاني (1759–1782)
2		Moustapha Khodja مصطفى خوجة (c. 1720–1800)	•	26 May 1782	1800	Independent	None	Hammouda I حمودة الأول (1782–1814)
3		Youssef Saheb Ettabaa يوسف صاحب الطابع (c. 1765–1815)	•	1800	23 January 1815	Independent	None	Othman I عثمان الأول (1814)
4		Mohamed Larbi Zarrouk Khaznadar محمد العربي زروق خزندار (1760–1822)	•	1815	1822	Independent	None	Mahmoud I محمود الأول (1814–1824)
5		Hussein Khodja حسين خوجة (c.1780–1857)	•	1822	1829	Independent	None	Hussein II حسين الثاني (1824–1835)
6		Shakir Saheb Ettabaa شاكير صاحب الطابع (c. 1790–1837)	•	1829	1837	Independent	None	Mustafa I مصطفى الأول (1835–1837)
7		Mustapha Saheb Ettabaa مصطفى صاحب الطابع (1784–1861)	•	1837	1855	Independent	None	Ahmad I أحمد الأول (1837–1855)
8		Mustapha Khaznadar مصطفى خزندار (1817–1878)	•	1855	22 October 1873	Independent	None	Muhammad II محمد الثاني (1855–1859)
9		Hayreddin Pasha خير الدين باشا التونسي (1822–1890)	•	22 October 1873	21 July 1877	Independent	None	Muhammad III as-Sadiq محمد الثالث الصادق (1859–1882)
10		Mohammed Khaznadar محمد خزندار (c. 1810–1889)	•	21 July 1877	24 August 1878	Independent	None	Muhammad III as-Sadiq محمد الثالث الصادق (1859–1882)
11		Mustapha Ben Ismaïl مصطفى بن اسماعيل (c. 1850–1887)	•	24 August 1878	12 September 1881	Independent	None	Muhammad III as-Sadiq محمد الثالث الصادق (1859–1882)
(10)		Mohammed Khaznadar محمد خزندار (c. 1810–1889)	•	12 September 1881	October 1882	Independent	None	Muhammad III as-Sadiq محمد الثالث الصادق (1859–1882)
12		Mohammed Aziz Bouattour محمد العزيز بوعتور (1825–1907)	•	October 1882	4 February 1907	Independent	None	Ali III علي الثالث (1882–1902)
12		Mohammed Aziz Bouattour محمد العزيز بوعتور (1825–1907)	•	October 1882	4 February 1907	Independent	None	Muhammad IV al-Hadi محمد الرابع الهادي (1902–1906)
13		M'hamed Djellouli امحمّد جلولي (1834–1908)	•	18 February 1907	June 1908 (Note: Died in office.)	Independent	None	Muhammad V an-Nasir محمد الخامس الناصر (1906–1922)
14		Youssef Djaït يوسف جعيط (1830–1915)	•	June 1908	June 1915	Independent	None	Muhammad V an-Nasir محمد الخامس الناصر (1906–1922)
15		Taïeb Djellouli الطيب جلولي (1857–1944)	•	October 1915	May 1922	Independent	None	Muhammad V an-Nasir محمد الخامس الناصر (1906–1922)
16		Mustapha Dinguizli مصطفى الدنقزلي (1865–1926)	•	May 1922	20 October 1926	Independent	None	Muhammad VI al-Habib محمد السادس الحبيب (1922–1929)
17		Khelil Bouhageb خليل بوحاجب (1863–1942)	•	3 November 1926	2 March 1932	Independent	None	Muhammad VI al-Habib محمد السادس الحبيب (1922–1929)
18		Hédi Lakhoua الهادي الأخوة (1872–1949)	•	2 March 1932	31 December 1942	Independent	None	Ahmad II أحمد الثاني (1929–1942)
19		Mohamed Chenik محمد شنيق (1889–1976)	1	1 January 1943	15 May 1943	Destour	None	Muhammad VII al-Munsif محمد السابع المنصف (1942–1943)
20		Slaheddine Baccouche صلاح الدين البكوش (1883–1959)	1	15 May 1943	21 July 1947	Independent	None	Muhammad VIII al-Amin محمد الثامن الأمين (1943–1957)
21		Mustapha Kaak مصطفى الكعاك (1893–1984)	•	21 July 1947	17 August 1950	Independent	None	Muhammad VIII al-Amin محمد الثامن الأمين (1943–1957)
(19)		Mohamed Chenik محمد شنيق (1889–1976)	2	17 August 1950	26 March 1952	Destour	None	Muhammad VIII al-Amin محمد الثامن الأمين (1943–1957)
(20)		Slaheddine Baccouche صلاح الدين البكوش (1883–1959)	2	12 April 1952	2 March 1954	Independent	None	Muhammad VIII al-Amin محمد الثامن الأمين (1943–1957)
22		Mohamed Salah Mzali محمد صالح مزالي (1896–1984)	•	2 March 1954	6 July 1954	Independent	None	Muhammad VIII al-Amin محمد الثامن الأمين (1943–1957)
Office vacant (6 July 1954 – 7 August 1954); Secretary general of the government Georges Dupoizat was in charge of its affairs								Muhammad VIII al-Amin محمد الثامن الأمين (1943–1957)
23		Tahar Ben Ammar الطاهر بن عمار (1889–1985)	•	7 August 1954	11 April 1956	Destour	None	Muhammad VIII al-Amin محمد الثامن الأمين (1943–1957)
24		Habib Bourguiba الحبيب بورقيبة (1903–2000)	•	11 April 1956	25 July 1957 (Note: Parliament voted to abolish the monarchy and appoint him as president.)	Neo Destour	1956	Muhammad VIII al-Amin محمد الثامن الأمين (1943–1957)

=== Republic ===
No.	Portrait	Name (Birth–Death)	Term of office			Party	Election	President
Office vacant (25 July 1957 – 7 November 1969); Presidential system: The president directs the government (Bourguiba government)							1959; 1964	Habib Bourguiba الحبيب بورقيبة (1957–1987)
25		Bahi Ladgham الباهي الأدغم (1913–1998)	•	7 November 1969	2 November 1970	SDP	1969	Habib Bourguiba الحبيب بورقيبة (1957–1987)
26		Hédi Nouira الهادي نويرة (1911–1993)	•	2 November 1970	23 April 1980	SDP	1974; 1979	Habib Bourguiba الحبيب بورقيبة (1957–1987)
27		Mohammed Mzali محمد مزالي (1925–2010)	•	23 April 1980	8 July 1986	SDP	1981	Habib Bourguiba الحبيب بورقيبة (1957–1987)
28		Rachid Sfar رشيد صفر (1933–2023)	•	8 July 1986	2 October 1987	SDP	1986	Habib Bourguiba الحبيب بورقيبة (1957–1987)
29		Zine El Abidine Ben Ali زين العابدين بن علي (1936–2019)	•	2 October 1987	7 November 1987	SDP	1986	Habib Bourguiba الحبيب بورقيبة (1957–1987)
30		Hédi Baccouche الهادي البكوش (1930–2020)	1; 2; 3	7 November 1987	27 September 1989	DCR	1986	Zine El Abidine Ben Ali زين العابدين بن علي (1987–2011)
31		Hamed Karoui حامد القروي (1927–2020)	•	27 September 1989	17 November 1999	DCR	1989; 1994	Zine El Abidine Ben Ali زين العابدين بن علي (1987–2011)
32		Mohamed Ghannouchi محمد الغنوشي (b. 1941)	1; 2	17 November 1999	27 February 2011	DCR	1999; 2004; 2009	Zine El Abidine Ben Ali زين العابدين بن علي (1987–2011)
33		Beji Caid Essebsi الباجي قائد السبسي (1926–2019)	•	27 February 2011	24 December 2011	Independent	None	Fouad Mebazaa فؤاد المبزع (2011)
34		Hamadi Jebali حمادي الجبالي (b. 1949)	•	24 December 2011	13 March 2013	Ennahda	2011	Moncef Marzouki المنصف المرزوقي (2011–2014)
35		Ali Laarayedh علي العريض (b. 1955)	•	13 March 2013	29 January 2014	Ennahda	2011	Moncef Marzouki المنصف المرزوقي (2011–2014)
36		Mehdi Jomaa مهدي جمعة (b. 1962)	•	29 January 2014	6 February 2015	Independent	2011	Moncef Marzouki المنصف المرزوقي (2011–2014)
37		Habib Essid الحبيب الصيد (b. 1949)	•	6 February 2015	27 August 2016	Independent	2014	Beji Caid Essebsi الباجي قائد السبسي (2014–2019)
38		Youssef Chahed يوسف الشاهد (b. 1975)	•	27 August 2016	27 February 2020	Nidaa Tounes	2014	Beji Caid Essebsi الباجي قائد السبسي (2014–2019)
38		Youssef Chahed يوسف الشاهد (b. 1975)	•	27 August 2016	27 February 2020	Tahya Tounes	2014	Mohamed Ennaceur محمد الناصر (2019)
39		Elyes Fakhfakh إلياس الفخفاخ (b. 1972)	•	27 February 2020	2 September 2020	Ettakatol	2019	Kais Saied قيس سعيد (2019–)
40		Hichem Mechichi هشام المشيشي (b. 1974)	•	2 September 2020	25 July 2021	Independent	2019	Kais Saied قيس سعيد (2019–)
Office vacant (25 July 2021 – 11 October 2021); The president directed the government temporarily after political crisis							2019	Kais Saied قيس سعيد (2019–)
41		Najla Bouden نجلاء بودن (b. 1958)	•	11 October 2021	1 August 2023	Independent	2023	Kais Saied قيس سعيد (2019–)
42		Ahmed Hachani أحمد الحشاني (b. 1956)	•	1 August 2023	7 August 2024	Independent	2023	Kais Saied قيس سعيد (2019–)
43		Kamel Madouri كمال المدوري (b. 1974)	•	7 August 2024	21 March 2025	Independent	2023	Kais Saied قيس سعيد (2019–)
44		Sara Zaafarani سارة زعفراني (b. 1963)	•	21 March 2025	Incumbent	Independent	2023	Kais Saied قيس سعيد (2019–)

== Statistics ==
=== Monarchy ===
==== Rank by time in office ====
Mohammed Aziz Bouattour; Longest term: 24 years, 98 days 1882–1907	Mohamed Salah Mzali; Shortest term: 126 days 1954

Rank	Prime Minister	Time in office
1	Mohammed Aziz Bouattour	24 years, 98 days
2	Rejeb Khaznadar	23 years, 103 days
3	Mustapha Khaznadar	18 years, 294 days
4	Mustapha Saheb Ettabaa	18 years, 0 days
5	Moustapha Khodja	17 years, 220 days
6	Youssef Saheb Ettabaa	15 years, 22 days
7	Hédi Lakhoua	10 years, 304 days
8	Shakir Saheb Ettabaa	8 years, 0 days
9	Youssef Djaït	7 years, 122 days
9	Larbi Zarrouk Khaznadar	7 years, 0 days
11	Hussein Khodja	7 years, 0 days
12	Taïeb Djellouli	6 years, 212 days
13	Khelil Bouhageb	5 years, 120 days
14	Slaheddine Baccouche	5 years, 26 days (Note: Two separate terms.)
15	Mustapha Dinguizli	4 years, 172 days
16	Kheireddine Pacha	3 years, 272 days
17	Mustapha Kaak	3 years, 27 days
18	Mustapha Ben Ismail	3 years, 19 days
19	Mohammed Khaznadar	2 years, 53 days
20	Mohamed Chenik	1 years, 356 days
21	Tahar Ben Ammar	1 year, 248 days
22	Habib Bourguiba	1 year, 105 days
23	M'hamed Djellouli	1 year, 104 days
24	Mohamed Salah Mzali	126 days

=== Republic ===
==== Rank by time in office ====
Mohamed Ghannouchi; Longest term: 11 years, 102 days 1999–2011	Zine El Abidine Ben Ali; Shortest term: 36 days 1987

Rank	Prime Minister	Time in office
1	Mohamed Ghannouchi	11 years, 102 days
2	Hamed Karoui	10 years, 51 days
3	Hedi Nouira	9 years, 173 days
4	Mohamed Mzali	6 years, 76 days
5	Youssef Chahed	3 years, 184 days
6	Hedi Baccouche	1 year, 324 days
7	Najla Bouden	1 year, 294 days
8	Habib Essid	1 year, 203 days
9	Sara Zaafarani	1 year, 113 days
10	Rachid Sfar	1 year, 86 days
11	Hamadi Jebali	1 year, 79 days
12	Mehdi Jomaa	1 year, 8 days
13	Ahmed Hachani	1 year, 6 days
14	Bahi Ladgham	360 days
15	Hichem Mechichi	326 days
16	Ali Laarayedh	322 days
17	Beji Caid Essebsi	300 days
18	Kamel Madouri	226 days
19	Elyes Fakhfakh	188 days
20	Zine El Abidine Ben Ali	36 days

== See also ==
- Politics of Tunisia
- List of beys of Tunis
- List of French residents-general in Tunisia
- President of Tunisia
  - List of presidents of Tunisia
  - First Lady of Tunisia
- Prime Minister of Tunisia
