= Ministry of the Pen =

Tunisian ministry

The Ministry of the Pen (Arabic: وزارة القلم, French: Ministère de la Plume) was a ministerial position in Tunisia between 1860 and the end of the monarchical regime in 1957.

== Bach kateb ==
The Minister of the Pen replaced the former role of the Bey's principal secretary (bach kateb). The bach katebs under each ruler were:

- Hussein Bey: Belhassen Sehili and fr:Hussein Khouja
- Ali Bey: Abdellatif Sehili then Abderrahmane Baklouti
- Mohamed Rachid Bey: fr:Ahmed Lasram
- Ali II Bey: Abderrahmane Baklouti
- Hammouda Pasha: Abderrahmane Baklouti, fr:Hammouda Ben Abdelaziz, Mohamed Darnaoui, fr:Mohamed Lasram III
- Hussein II Bey: fr:Mahmoud Lasram
- Mustapha Bey: fr:Mohamed Lasram IV
- Ahmed Bey, Mohammed Bey and Sadok Bey: Mohamed Lasram IV with vacant periods until 1861

Mohamed Lasram IV fell out with Mustapha Khaznadar and resigned from his post, only becoming bach kateb once again in 1855 under Mohammed Bey. At his death in 1861 the post fell vacant, until Sadok Bey appointed Mohammed Aziz Bouattour, a prominent young scribe at court favoured by the Grand Vizier Mustapha Khaznadar in 1864. A few months later, during the constitution of the first modern Tunisian government, the Ministry of the Pen was created, with Bouattour as the first office-holder.

== Role and responsibilities ==
Headed by the Minister of the Pen, the ministry included the Diwan el Incha (chancellery) composed of several secretaries and scribes working in Arabic and Turkish (Tunisia was officially a province of the Ottoman Empire) as well as in various other consular languages such as French and Italian. This chancellery was permanently based in Dar El Bey in the medina of Tunis. Its holder was responsible for drafting and presenting acts and decrees (amr) for the signature of the sovereign or his keeper of the seals (saheb ettabaa). In addition, he was responsible for keeping the sovereign's correspondence with the administration and state institutions, such as the Sharia councils, the diwan of Tunis, or the Ottoman general staff. He was also required to send the Beylical orders to the various provinces of the regency of Tunis.

Under the French protectorate, the ministry was reorganized to house both the chancellery and the central administration of the qaids the interior: it gradually became a sort of interior ministry. It was indeed renamed as the Ministry of the Interior during the second government of Mohamed Chenik in 1950, under Lamine Bey.

== Officeholders ==
Image	Nom	Grand Vizier	Assumed office	Relinquished office
	Mohammed Aziz Bouattour	Mustapha Khaznadar; Kheireddine Pacha; Mohammed Khaznadar (first mandate); Mustapha Ben Ismaïl; Mohammed Khaznadar (second mandate)	1864	1882
	M'hamed Djellouli	Mohammed Aziz Bouattour	1882	1907
	Youssef Djaït	M'hamed Djellouli	1907	1908
	Taïeb Djellouli	Youssef Djaït	1908	1914
	Mustapha Dinguizli	Youssef Djaït; Taïeb Djellouli	1914	1922
	Khelil Bouhageb	Mustapha Dinguizli	1922	1926
	Hédi Lakhoua	Khelil Bouhageb	1926	1932
	fr:Younès Hadjouj	Hédi Lakhoua	1932	1935
	fr:Ali Sakkat	Hédi Lakhoua	1935	1935
	Abdeljelil Zaouche	Hédi Lakhoua	1935	1936
	Ahmed Ben Raïes	Hédi Lakhoua	1936	1941
	fr:Habib Djellouli	Hédi Lakhoua	1941	31 December 1942
	Mahmoud El Materi (Minister of the Interior)	Mohamed Chenik	1 January 1943	15 May 1943
	fr:Hassan Hosni Abdelwaheb	Slaheddine Baccouche	15 May 1943	July 1947
	Mahmoud El Materi (Minister of the Interior)	Mohamed Chenik	17 August 1950	26 March 1952
