= M'hamed Djellouli =

Tunisian politician

Prime Minister of Tunisia
- In office 18 February 1907 – June 1908
- Monarch: Muhammad V
- Preceded by: Mohammed Aziz Bouattour
- Succeeded by: Youssef Djaït

Minister of the Pen
- In office October 1882 – February 1907
- Monarchs: Muhammad III; Ali III; Muhammad IV; Muhammad V
- Preceded by: Mohammed Aziz Bouattour
- Succeeded by: Youssef Djaït

Personal details
- Born: February 1834 Tunis, Beylik of Tunis
- Died: June 1908 (aged 72) Tunis, French Tunisia
- Spouse(s): Lalla Fatma Ben Ayed; Lalla Mannana Louzir

M'hamed Djellouli (Arabic: امحمد الجلولي; born February 1834 in Tunis and died in June 1908) was a Tunisian politician who served as Prime Minister of Tunisia from 1907 until his death in 1908.

== Biography ==
He was born into a Makhzen family from Sfax.His grandfather Mahmoud Djellouli fixed in Tunis after buying an important house Dar Djellouli of Rejeb Khaznadar and his wife Fatma Bey. He began his career in 1872 as an official in the Methelith tribe. In 1874, he was appointed vice president of the Capital's City Council, while also leading Djerba and Methelith starting in 1875, when he became a brigadier general. In 1876, he became responsible for reviewing any cases between subjects of the Bey of Tunis and European nationals.

In 1880, he became governor of Kef Wanifa and Agha Odjak and caïd of Sfax and South Agha Odjak after the expulsion of his predecessor and uncle, Hassouna Djellouli. In 1890, he was replaced in Sfax by his nephew, Sadok Djellouli.

After proving his loyalty to France, he was appointed in 1881 by the French authorities to succeed Mohammed Aziz Bouattour as Minister of the Pen and Minister of Justice for the first government of the French Protectorate of Tunisia. In April 1887, he received a palace in Medina of Tunis on the rue du Riche (named in honor of his grandfather Mahmoud Djellouli) from Jules Ferry during his visit. Serving from 1882 to 1906, he succeeded Bouattour as grand vizier from 1907 to his death in June 1908. He is among the ministers buried in the Tourbet el Bey mausoleum located in the Medina of Tunis.
