= Mohammed Aziz Bouattour =

Tunisian politician and reformer

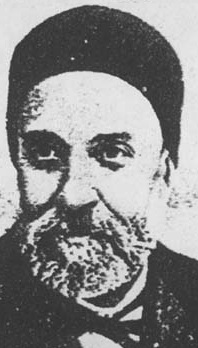

Prime Minister of Tunisia
- In office 1882 – 4 February 1907
- Monarchs: Muhammad III; Ali III; Muhammad IV; Muhammad V
- Preceded by: Mohammed Khaznadar
- Succeeded by: M'hamed Djellouli

Minister of the Pen
- In office 1864–1882
- Monarch: Muhammad III
- Preceded by: Office created
- Succeeded by: M'hamed Djellouli

Personal details
- Born: 1825 Tunis, Beylik of Tunis
- Died: 1907 (aged 81–82) La Marsa, French Tunisia

Mohammed Aziz Bouattour (Arabic: محمد العزيز بوعتور; born 1825 in Tunis, died in 1907 in La Marsa), was Prime Minister of the Beylik of Tunis from 1882 to 1907.

== Early life ==
He was born in the family home of the Rue du Pacha in Tunis, the Dar Ben Achour. He came from a patrician family descended from the third caliph Uthman that had originated in Sfax in the before moving to Tunis at the end of the 18th century.

His education at the Zaytuna Mosque began in 1839, and here he studied Arabic and the Sharia from distinguished scholars such as Sidi Ibrahim al-Riahi, Muhammad al-Shazli bin Saleh and Muhammad al-Taher ibn Ashour.

His grandfather and his uncles had reach high positions in the society of Tunis as notaries and in the state chancellery (diwan al-insha’ ). Bouattour followed their example and became secretary of the chancellery under the direction of the first secretary (bach kateb), Mohamed Lasram IV. When Lasram died in 1861, the private secretary of the young Sadok Bey, Ahmad ibn Abi Diyaf was approached to succeed him but his reformist leanings and his numerous criticisms counted against his promotion and Mustapha Khaznadar appointment the young Bouattour instead.

== Ministerial career ==
Bouattour became Minister of the Pen on November 26, 1864, and witness the signing of the Treaty of Bardo. The day after the establishment of the French protectorate of Tunisia in 1882, he was appointed Prime Minister of Tunisia, a position he held until 1907. He was the first ethnic Tunisian to occupy this post, as all previous officeholders had been foreign-born mamluks. In office, he deferred to the French Resident General, Paul Cambon, who reorganized and effectively headed the Tunisian administration.

The day after Ali Bey moved to La Marsa, Bouattour bought a large villa there from Sadok Bey's Italian doctor and settled there until his death. He is one of the ministers buried in the Tourbet el Bey mausoleum in the medina of Tunis.
