= Youssef Djaït =

Tunisian politician and reformer

Prime Minister of Tunisia
- In office 1908–1915
- Monarch: Muhammad V
- Preceded by: M'hamed Djellouli
- Succeeded by: Taïeb Djellouli

Minister of the Pen
- In office 1907–1908
- Monarch: Muhammad V
- Preceded by: M'hamed Djellouli
- Succeeded by: Taïeb Djellouli

Personal details
- Born: 1830 Tunis, Beylik of Tunis
- Died: 1915 (aged 84–85) Tunis, French Tunisia
- Spouse(s): Lalla Douja Belkhodja; Lalla Habiba Ben Jaafar
- Children: Mohamed Abdelaziz Djaït
- Relatives: Kamel Djaït (grandson); Hichem Djaït (grandson)

Youssef Djaït (Arabic: يوسف جعيط) (born 1830 in Tunis, died 1915), was Prime Minister of the Beylik of Tunis.

== Early life ==
He came from a family of scholars, who had originated in Yemen and then settled in Kairouan, and was noted for its contributions to religious studies. He studied at Zitouna University, aiming for a religious career like his ancestors. He later began to teach at the Zitouna and married first Douja Belkhodja and then Habiba Ben Jaafar, both daughters of notable Tunisian religious families of Turkish origin.

== Career ==
He was chosen as chancellery secretary at the Ministry of Foreign Affairs, where he spent several years, marking this still nascent service within the Makhzen. He entered the service of Baron Raffo, Minister of Italian origin, then that of General Mohamed Baccouche. Rising through the ranks, Djaït was head of the state section of justice when the French protectorate of Tunisia was established. It was only natural for Naceur Bey to place his trust in him as Minister of the Pen and then Grand Vizier in 1908, with the consent of France. His power was very reduced because of the tight control of the French Resident General.

It was under his government that the first manifestations of the nationalist movement took place. He thus had to face the Jellaz Affair in 1911 and the Tunis tram boycott in 1912 but failed to calm the violent waves of repression and arrests that followed. He died shortly after, in 1915, leaving the memory of an honest minister unable to keep pace with the national movement. He is one of the ministers buried in the mausoleum of Tourbet el Bey located in the medina of Tunis. Among his descendants were ulema, his son Mohamed Abdelaziz Djaït, Minister of Justice from 1947 to 1950, and his grandson Kameleddine Djaït, mufti of Tunisia.

== Decorations ==
He held several decorations including:

- Grand Cordon of the Order of Nichan Iftikhar
- Nicham Dam
- Nichân El-Ahd El-Mourassaâ
