= Tourbet el Bey =

Mausoleum in Tunisia

- تربة الباي
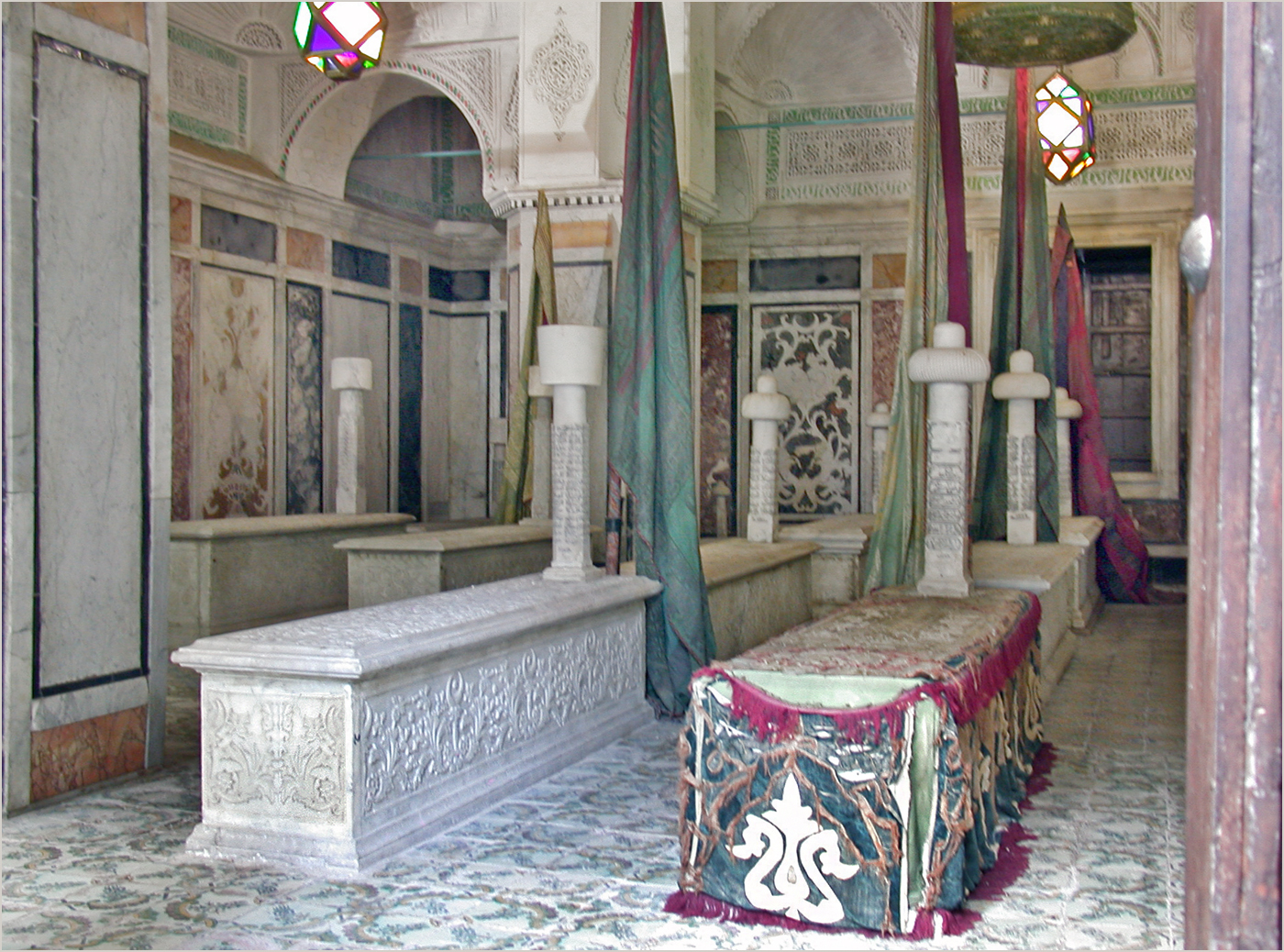
- Interactive map of Tourbet el Bey
- Location: Medina of Tunis, Tunisia
- Coordinates: 36°47′37.15″N 10°10′22.95″E
- Builder: Ali II ibn Hussein
- Type: Mausoleum
- Opening date: 1777
- Dedicated to: Tunisian Royal Family; Makhzen

The Tourbet el Bey (Arabic: تربة الباي) is a Tunisian royal mausoleum in the southwest of the medina of Tunis.

It is the last resting place of most of the Husainid dynasty rulers of Tunisia. Among those not buried there are the last two - Moncef Bey, who is buried in the Jellaz Cemetery and Lamine Bey who is buried in La Marsa. The building, constructed in the reign of Ali II ibn Hussein (1759-1782) is the largest funerary monument in Tunis. The first tourba of Al-Husayn I ibn Ali stands opposite it.

== Royal mausoleum ==
The building is topped with domes, the main ones covered with green tortoiseshell-shaped tiles, and the facades are of ochre sandstone, decorated at regular intervals by pilasters and Italian-style entablatures in light-coloured stone. They correspond with the different funerary chambers inside which house the tombs of the ruling family and their wives, as well as of a number of their ministers and servants. The tombs, dug into the ground, are covered with marble chests ornamented in bas relief. The sarcophagi of the men have regularly-shaped columns bearing inscriptions, topped with a fez or a turban. Those of the women have marble plaques at each end, one of which carries an inscription.

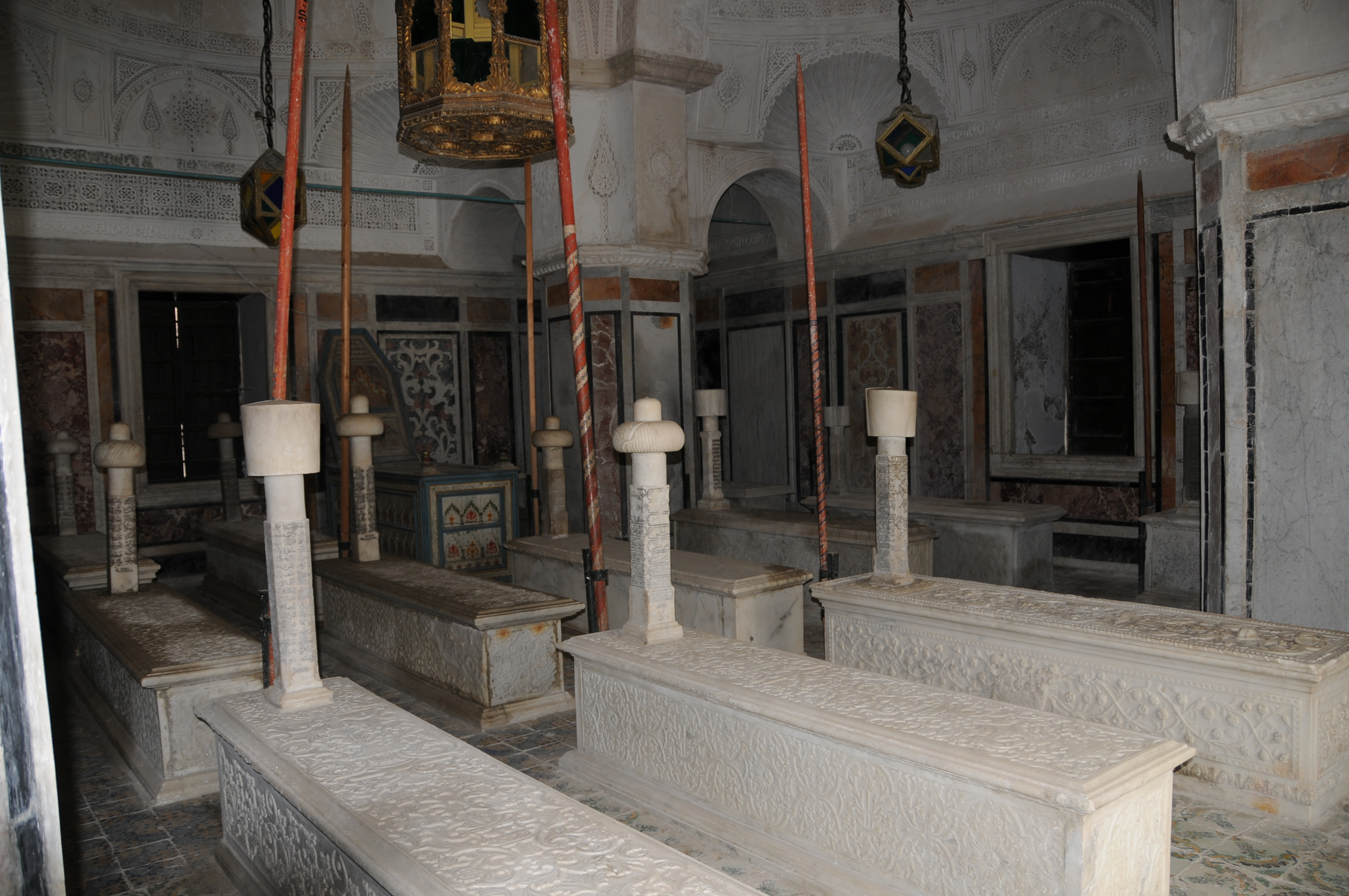
Funerary chamber of the Husainid beys

Plan of the funerary chamber

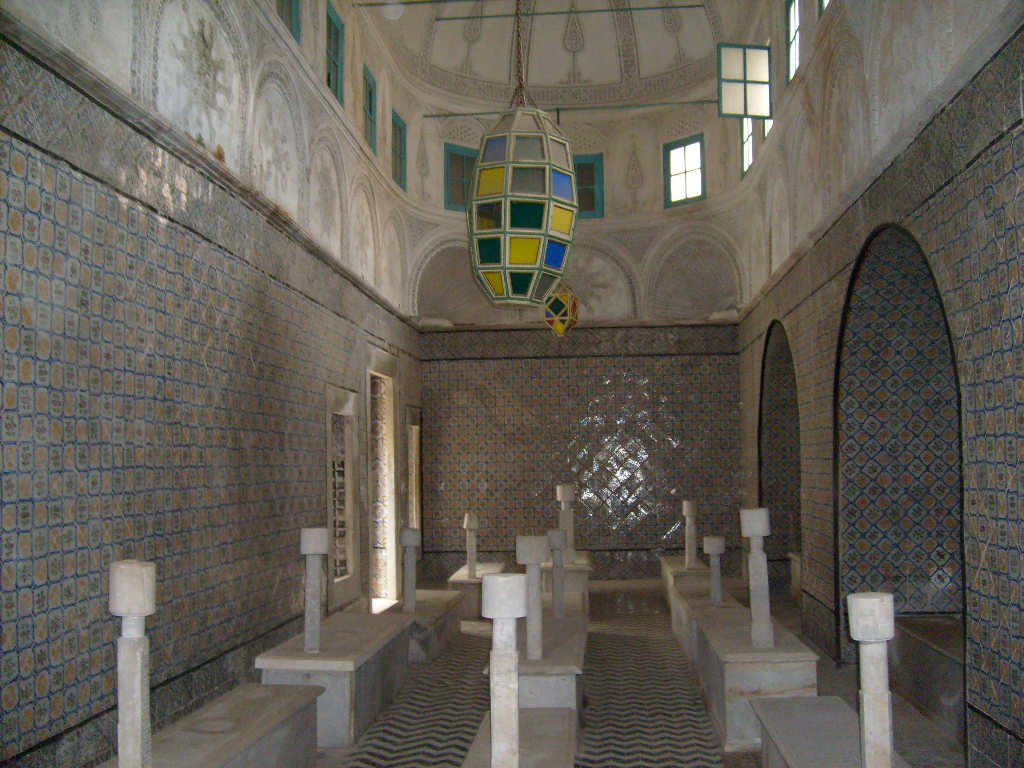
Chamber containing tombs of dignitaries

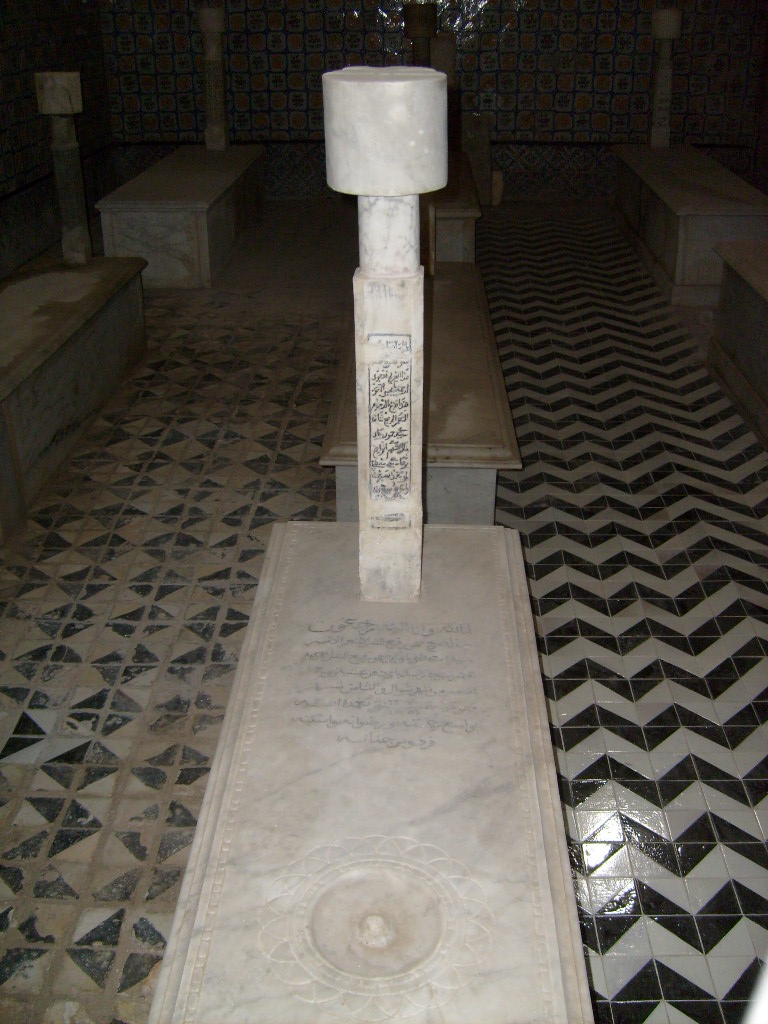
Detail of a dignitary's tomb

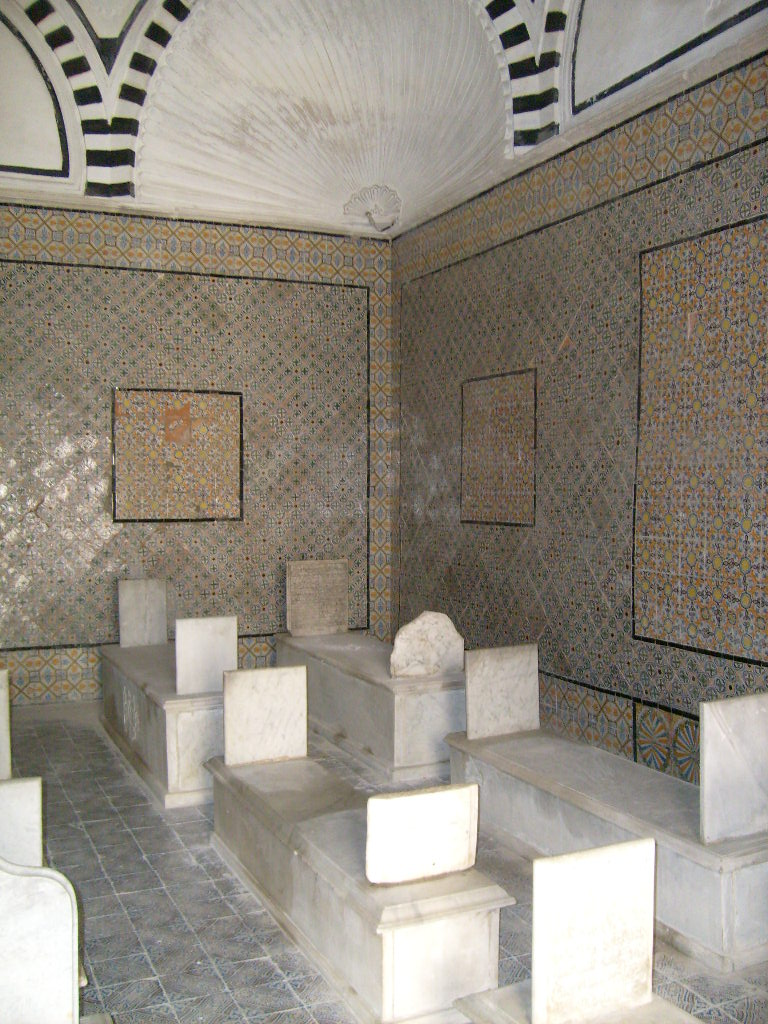
Chamber containing women's tombs

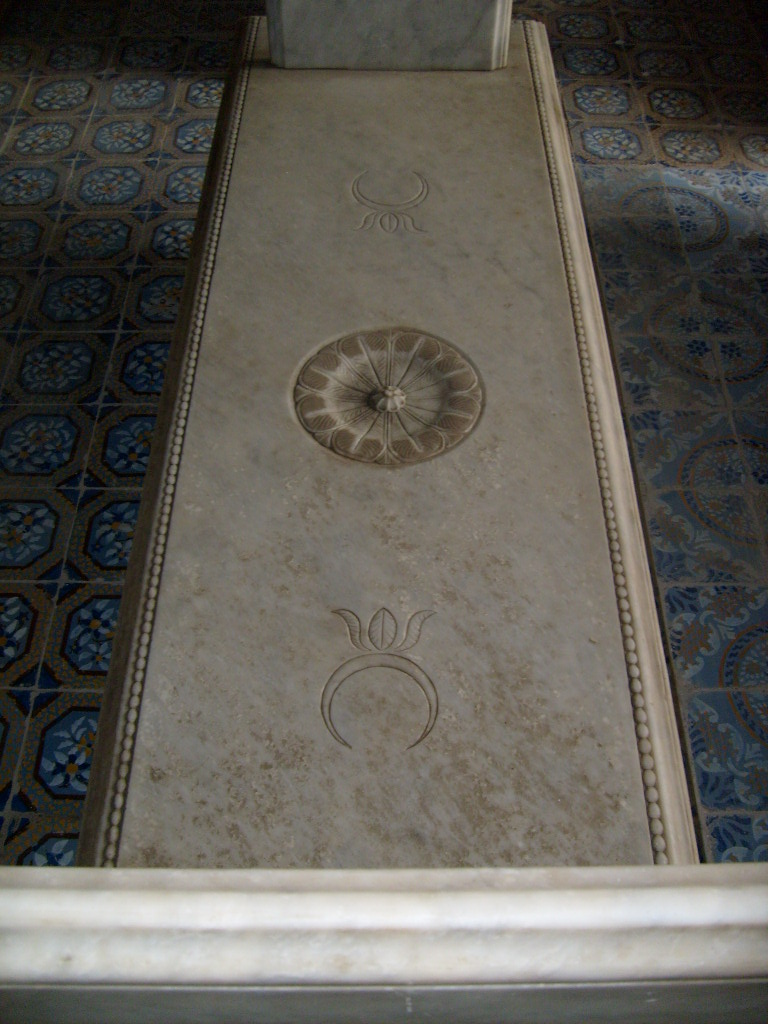
Detail of a woman's tomb

== Architecture and interior decoration ==
The monument is entered through a large hall which shows a distinct Italian influence in its decoration, mixed with Ottoman style, notably in the chamber of the beys. The mausoleum, which comprises eight funerary chambers covered with cupolas, is built around two patios. These are covered in slabs, and surrounded by porticos which rest on pillars of Carrara marble with neo-doric capitals. These patios open, on each side, into a funerary chamber. Some of these chambers are also linked directly to each other.

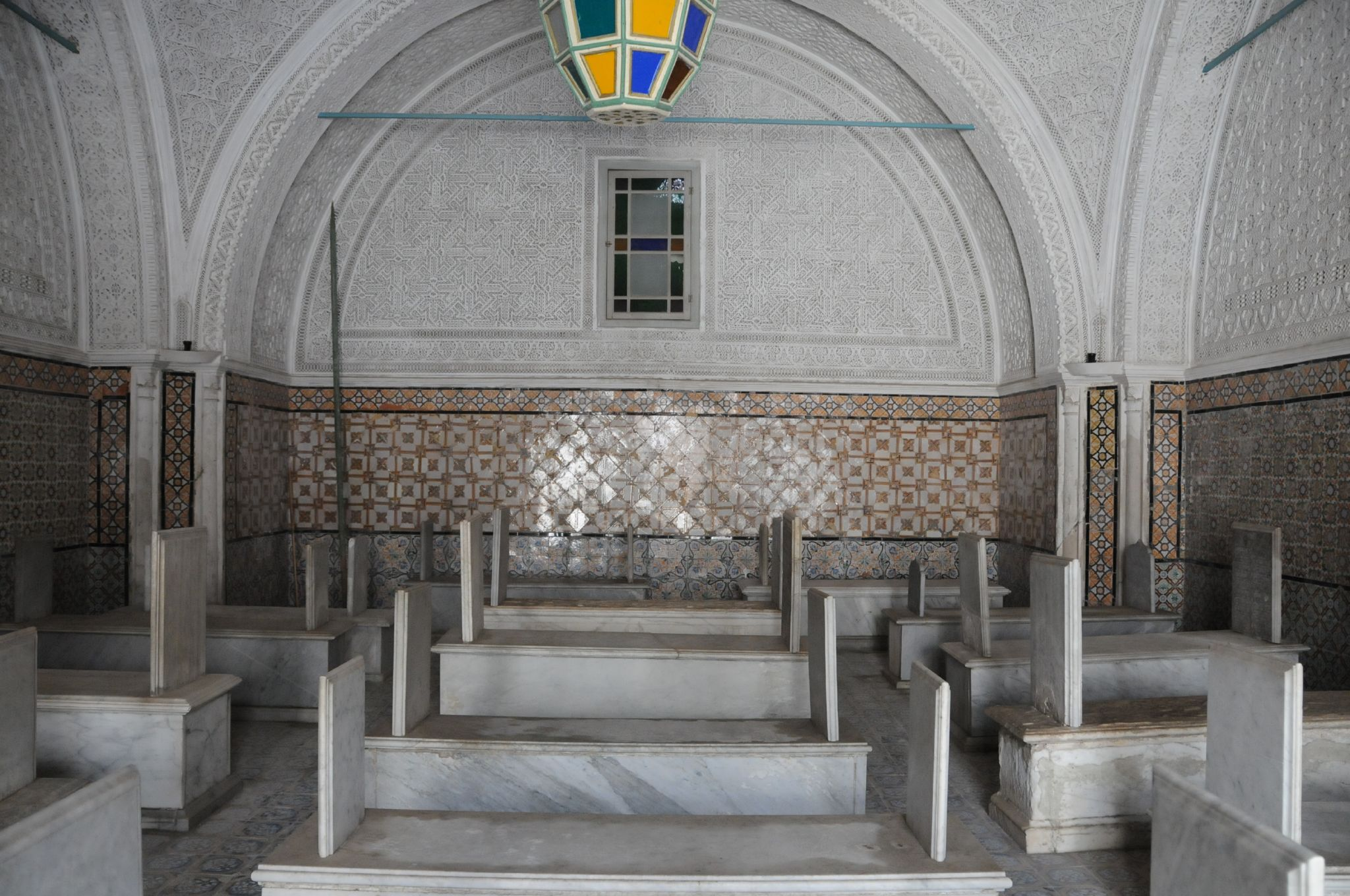
Walls in one chamber of the mausoleum displaying a combination of ceramic tiles with finely sculpted plaster

The south-west side opens into the chamber of the Beys, the most important chamber in the complex, housing the tombs of thirteen reigning Beys. The chamber is square, with walls fifteen metres long, and it replicates the proportions of an Ottoman mosque: four large cruciform pillars support a large central cupola which is slightly bulbous in form and flanked by four demi-cupolas on the sides and four in the corners. The only other building with this form in the medina of Tunis is the Sidi Mahrez mosque. The intricate decoration of the room blends Italian, Ottoman and local influences; the lower parts of the walls and the pillars are covered in panels of polychrome marble marquetry to a height of 2.5 metres, while finely-sculpted plaster lines the caps of the cupolas.

The ceilings of the mausoleum, either vaults or cupolas, are ornamented with stucco in geometric or plant designs. Some of these are polychrome, with the richness of the colours denoting the rank of the people buried in the chamber. One in particular is surprising in its architectural form - a large oval cupola. The walls are generally covered with ceramic tiles in orange and yellow hues, some of which were imported from Italy, particularly from Naples, while others are of local manufacture, from the Qallaline workshops. The chamber of the reigning Beys is the only one richly decorated with polychrome marble in the Italian style.

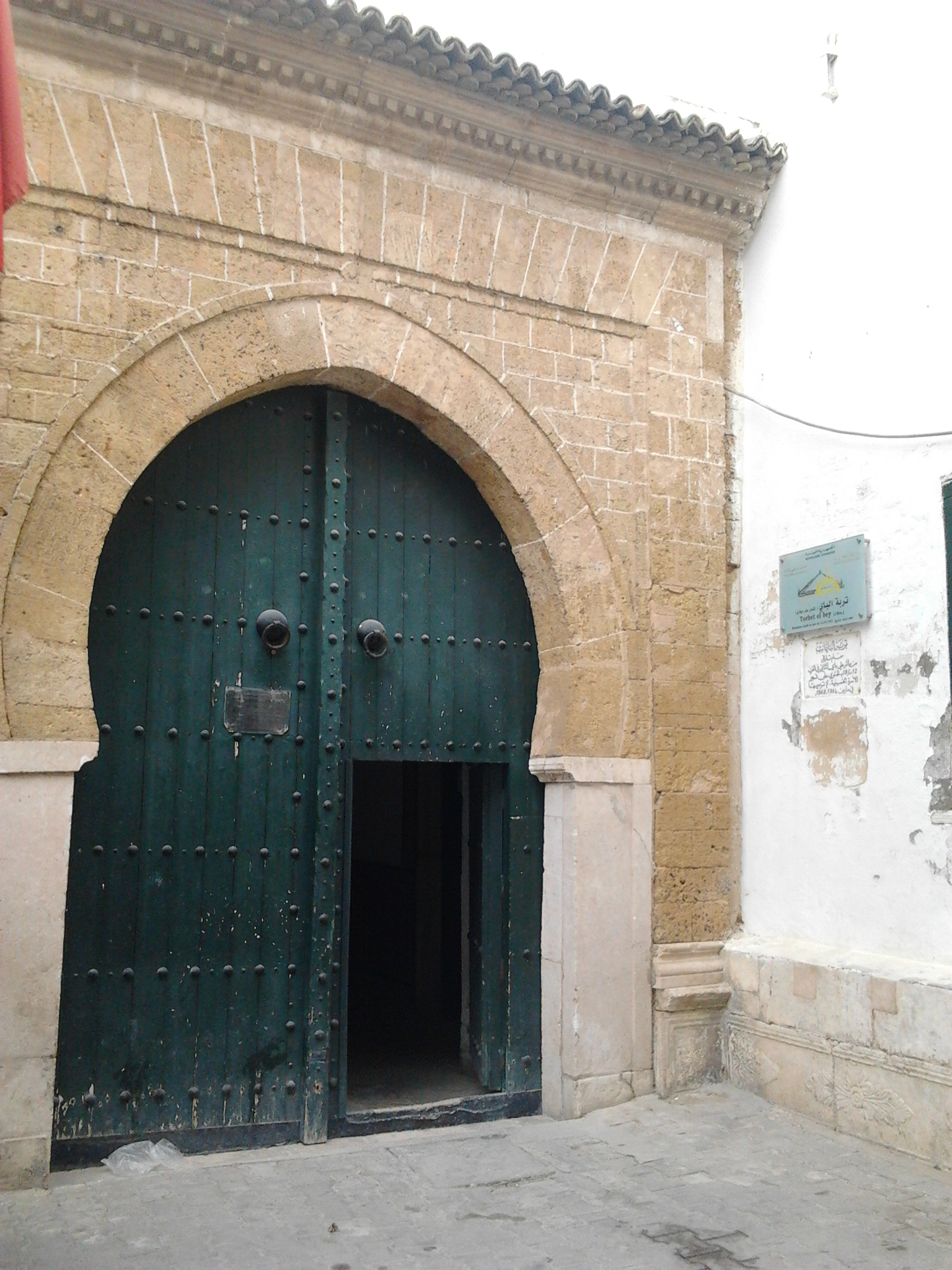
Main entrance

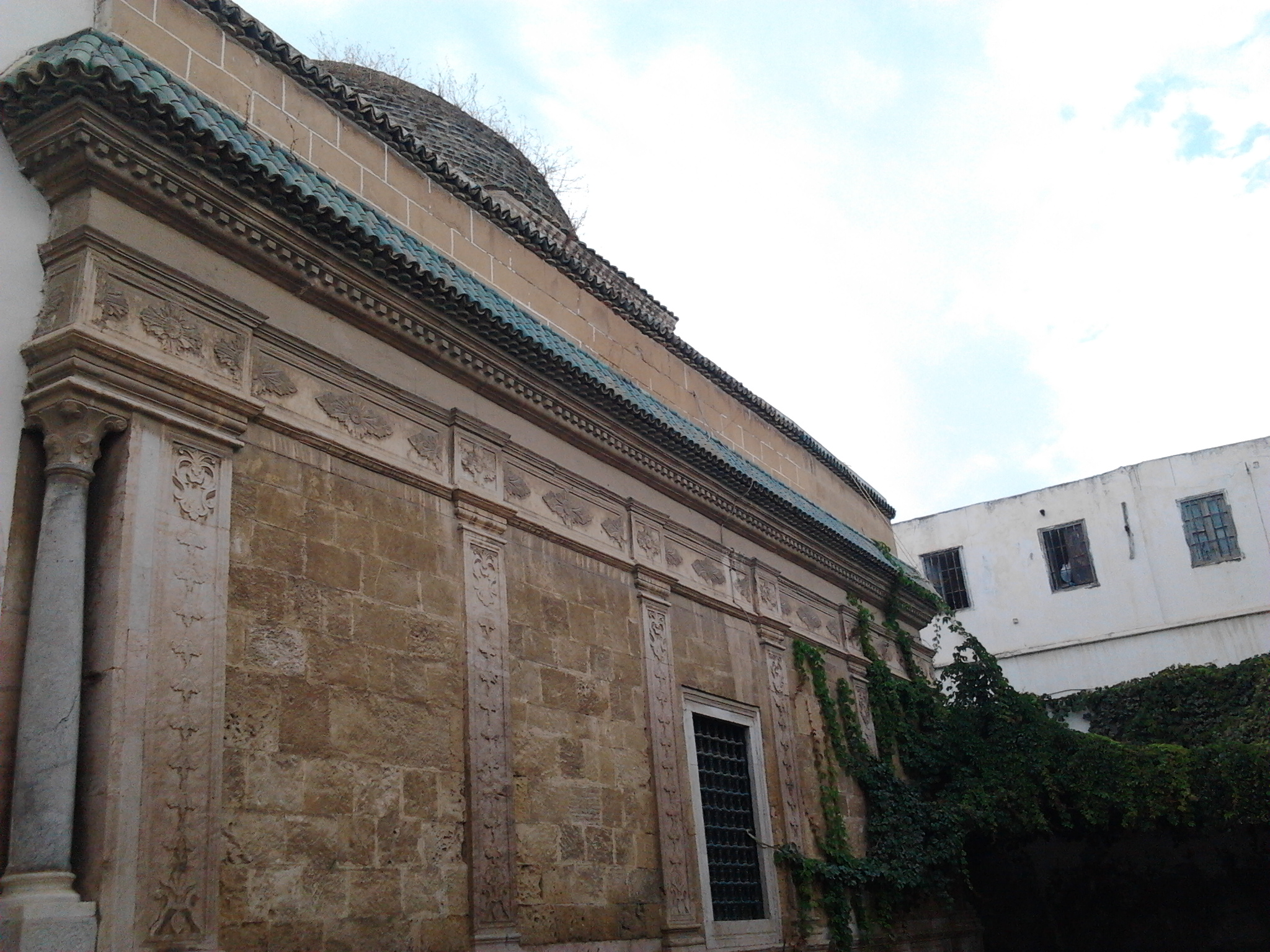
Outside view

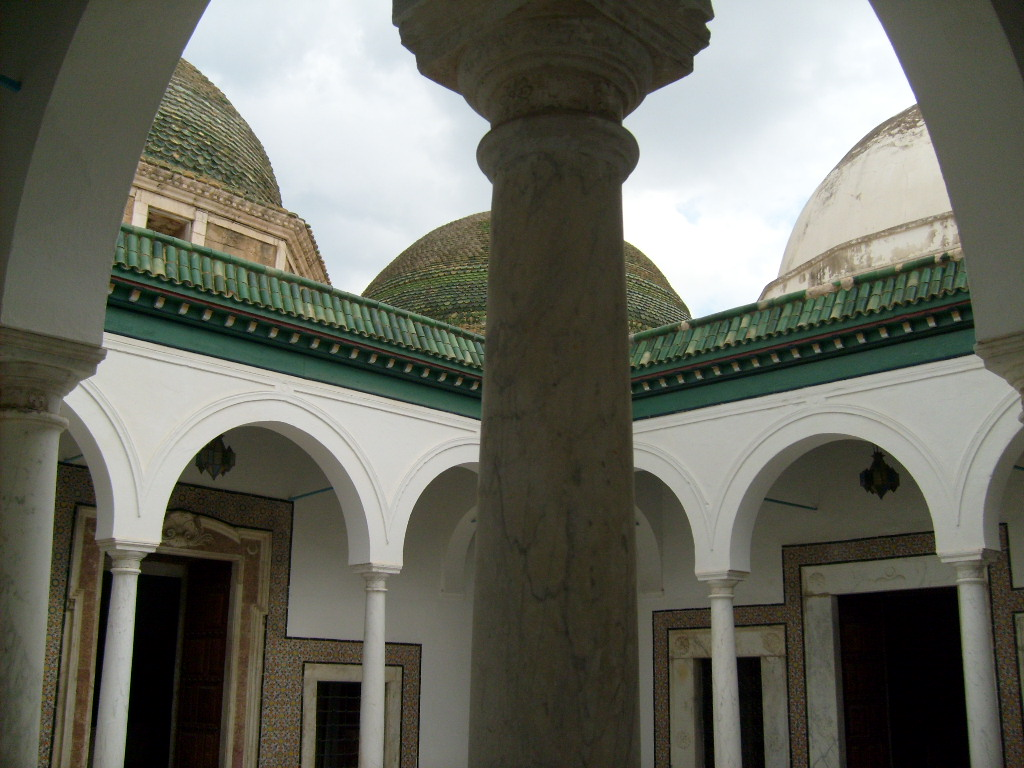
Main courtyard

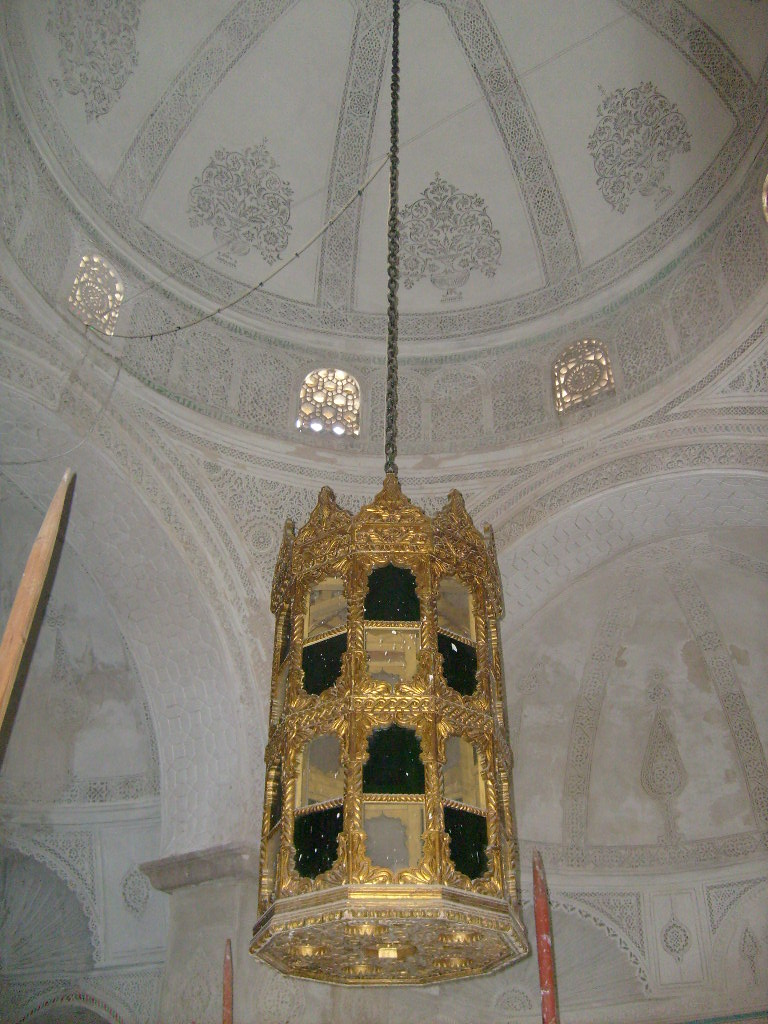
Cupola chamber of the beys

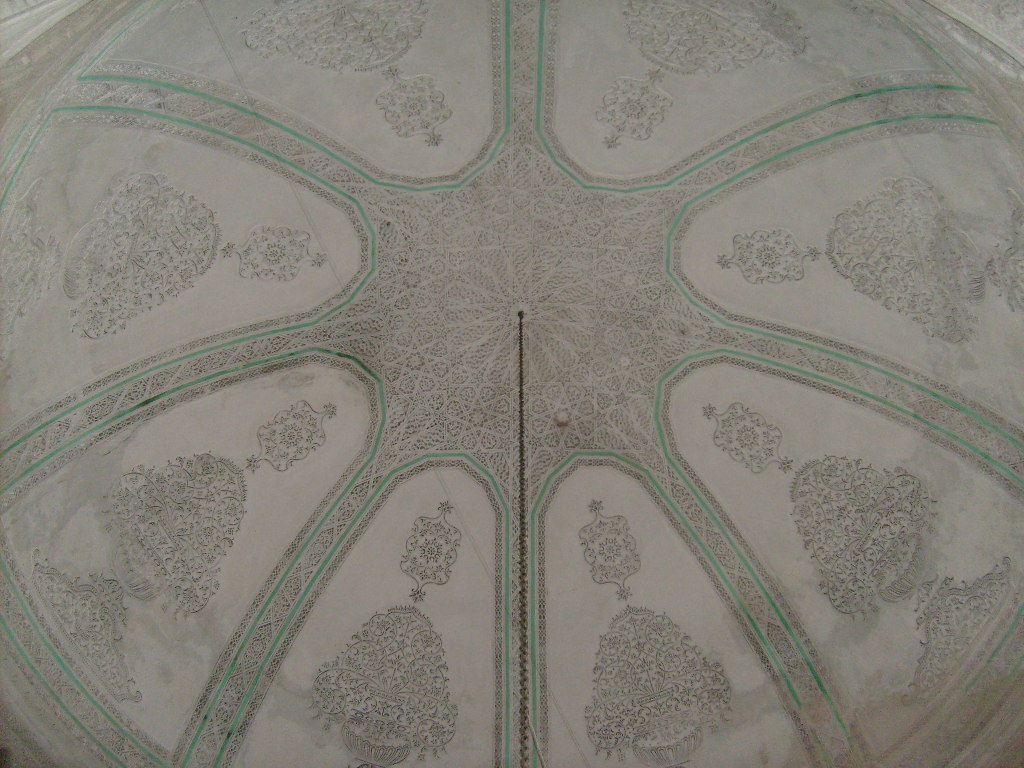
Detail of a cupola with stucco motifs and green highlights

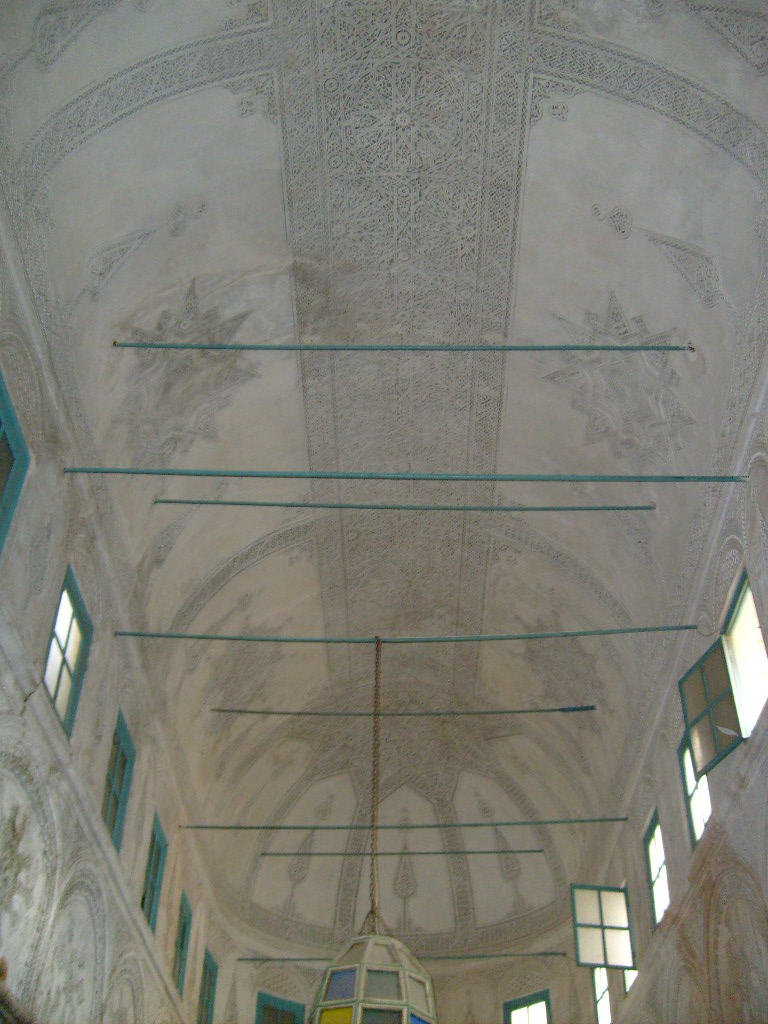
Oval ceiling

== Conservation ==
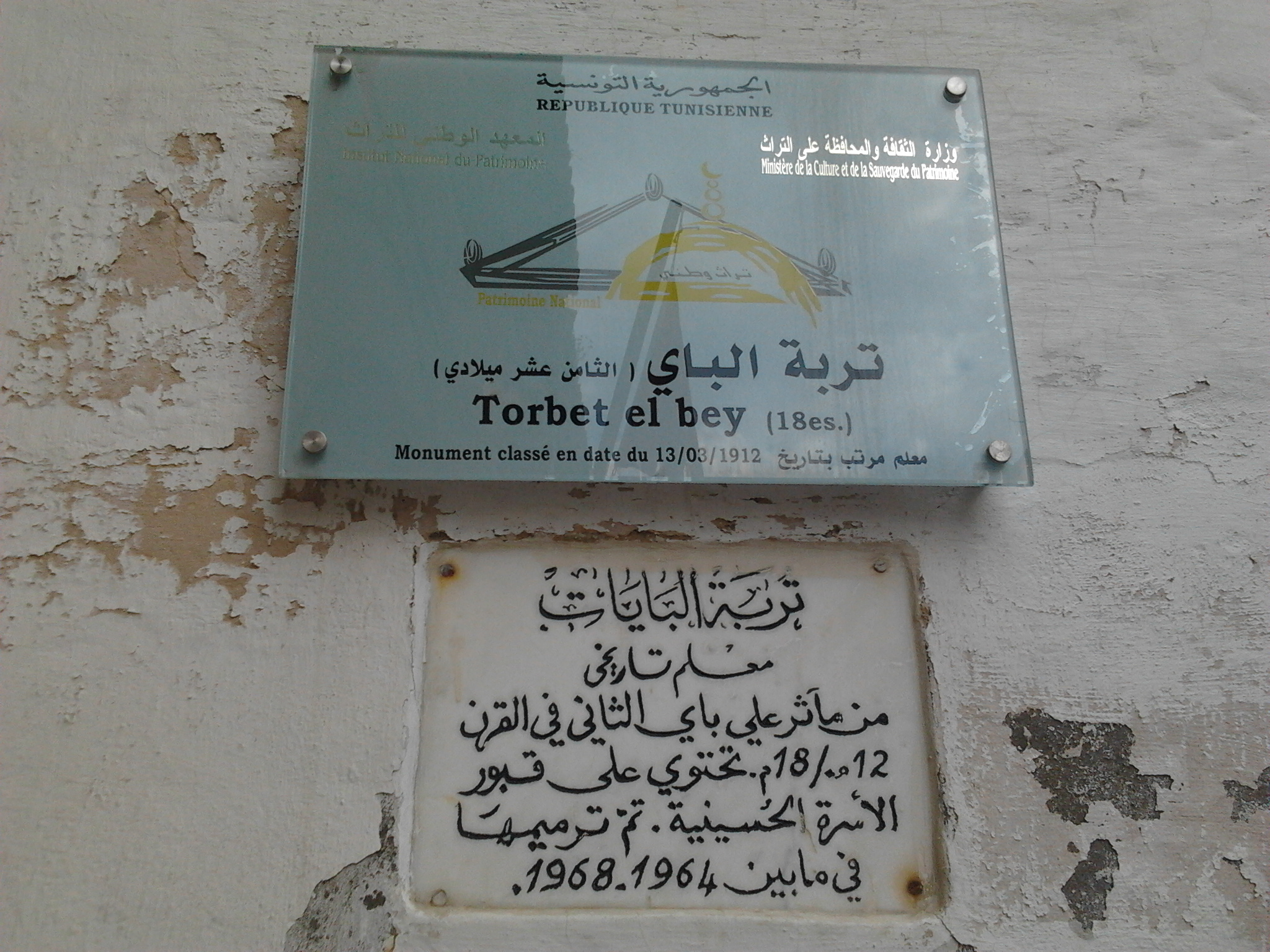
Plaque of the National Heritage Institute and plaque to commemorate the restoration undertaken 1964-1968

For around thirty years the tourbet was abandoned and even partly squatted for a time and its roof structures and rich decorations deteriorated. In the 1990s the National Heritage Institute (INP) began restoration work and opened a ticket office to allow visitors. Nevertheless, it seems that the upkeep of the building continues to leave much to be desired. Care of this monument depends ultimately on the Tunisian Culture Ministry through the National Heritage Institute and the Agency for the Development of National Heritage and Cultural Promotion.

On February 24, 2023, the monument was reopened after eleven years of closure and restoration work, which cost approximately 120,000 dinars.

== List of burials ==
=== Monarchs ===
Name	Explanation	Birth	Death	Notes
Ali II Bey		1712	1782	
Hammouda Pacha Bey		1759	1814	
Othman Bey		1763	1814	
Mahmoud Bey		1757	1824	
Hussein II Bey		1784	1835	
Mustapha Bey		1787	1837	
Ahmad I Bey		1805	1855	
Mohammed II Bey		1811	1859	
Sadok Bey		1813	1882	
Ali III Bey		1817	1902	
Hedi Bey		1855	1906	
Naceur Bey		1855	1922	
Habib Bey		1858	1929	
Ahmed II Bey		1862	1942	

=== Other Members of Royal Family ===
Name	Birth	Death	Notes
Maamoun Bey	1762	1784	Son of Ali II Bey
Ismail Bey	1759	1816	Son of Rachid Bey
Said Bey		1859	Son of M'hamed Bey
Mohamed Maamoun Bey	1819	1861	Son of Hussein II Bey; Father of Habib Bey
Adel Bey	1831	1867	Son of Hussein II Bey
Lalla Znaikha		1868	
Lalla Aicha		1870	
Mohamed Taieb Bey	1822	1898	Son of Hussein II Bey
Ezzeddine Bey	1882	1953	Bey of The Camp (1943-1953)
Sadok Bey	1883	1955	Bey of The Camp (1953-1955)

=== Ministers ===
Name	Explanation	Birth	Death	Notes
Slimane Kahia	Minister of War	1779	1838	
Mustapha Khaznadar	Prime Minister	1817	1878	
Mohammed Aziz Bouattour	Prime Minister	1825	1907	
M'hamed Djellouli	Prime Minister	1834	1908	
Youssef Djaït	Prime Minister	1830	1915	
Mustapha Dinguizli	Prime Minister	1865	1926	

== See also ==
- Bourguiba mausoleum
- Tourbet Aziza Othmana
