= Moncef Bey =

Bey of Tunis

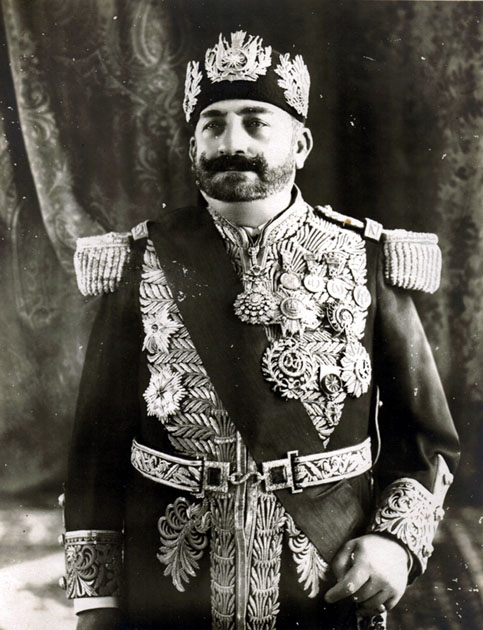
- Moncef Bey, 1940s

Bey of Tunis
- Reign: 19 June 1942 – 14 May 1943
- Predecessor: Ahmad II
- Successor: Muhammad VIII al-Amin
- Born: Muhammad VII al-Munsif; 4 March 1881; Tunis, Kingdom of Tunisia
- Died: 1 September 1948 (aged 67); Hotel de Cadaval, Pau, France
- Burial: Jellaz Cemetery, Tunisia
- Spouse: Lalla Traki Bey
- Issue: Sidi Slaheddine Bey; Sidi Mohamed Raouf Bey; Sidi Amor Bey; Lalla Frida
- Dynasty: Husainides
- Father: Muhammad V an-Nasir
- Mother: Lalla Fatma Sunni
- Religion: Islam

Muhammad VII al-Munsif, (Arabic: محمد السابع المنصف; 4 March 1881 in La Manouba – 1 September 1948 in Pau) commonly known as Moncef Bey (Arabic: المنصف باي) was the Bey of Tunis between 19 June 1942 and 14 May 1943. He was the penultimate ruler of the Husainid dynasty.

== Youth ==
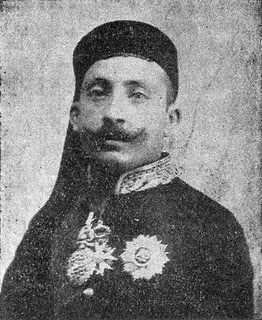
Portrait of Moncef Bey as a young man

Muhammad VII al-Munsif was the son of Muhammad V an-Nasir.

As a young man Moncef Bey distinguished himself during the events of April 1922 when he supported the nationalist Destour movement and prevailed on his father Naceur Bey to receive its representatives. He was invested as Bey al-Mahalla on 30 April 1942 and succeeded his first cousin once removed, Ahmed Bey, on the latter's death on 19 June of the same year.

== Reign ==
=== Relations with the Vichy regime ===
Moncef Bey
- Royal Family of Tunisia

On 2 July 1942, Moncef Bey was awarded the Grand Cross of the Légion d'honneur by the Vichy regime. Nevertheless, his attitude on the throne was not one which France found easy to deal with. Thus, in a memorandum of 2 August 1942 to Marshall Pétain presented by his Grand Vizier Hédi Lakhoua he reaffirmed his belief in Tunisian sovereignty, undiminished by the French protectorate. He insisted on the establishment of a consultative legislative council in which Tunisians would predominate, access to civil service roles for Tunisians, and measures against poverty and unemployment. He also wanted compulsory schooling in Arabic, the nationalisation of key enterprises, and a range of other measures of a broadly nationalist character.

On 12 October 1942, at the Eid al-Fitr ceremonies in the palace of La Marsa, Moncef Bey expressed his surprise that there was not a single Tunisian among the senior government personnel who were attending with the French Resident General, Admiral Jean-Pierre Esteva. Esteva replied 'seuls les Français sont aptes aux postes de commande' ('only the French are suited to positions of authority'). The Bey then sent a telegram to Marshal Pétain asking for Esteva to be recalled, the request was denied and tensions continued to mount between the Bey and Esteva In December 1942, a confrontation blew up during a session of the Council of Ministers between Esteva and the Minister of Justice Abdeljelil Zaouche, after the Minister expressed reservations about funding for the National Gendarmerie and Esteva angrily rejected any criticism of the gendarmerie. Moncef Bey considered that the Resident General's tone was an insult to his representative and thus to his own person.

Axis troops arrived in Tunisia on 16 November 1942, and the Tunisian Campaign turned much of the country into a battlefield. Moncef Bey was confronted by demands from Pétain to remain loyal to France and from Roosevelt to allow free passage for Allied troops. Moncef Bey proclaimed Tunisian neutrality while secretly providing assurances to Roosevelt that Tunisia would support the Allies. He also refused an offer from the Italian ambassador Bombieri to repudiate the Treaty of Bardo and enter into a new treaty with Italy.

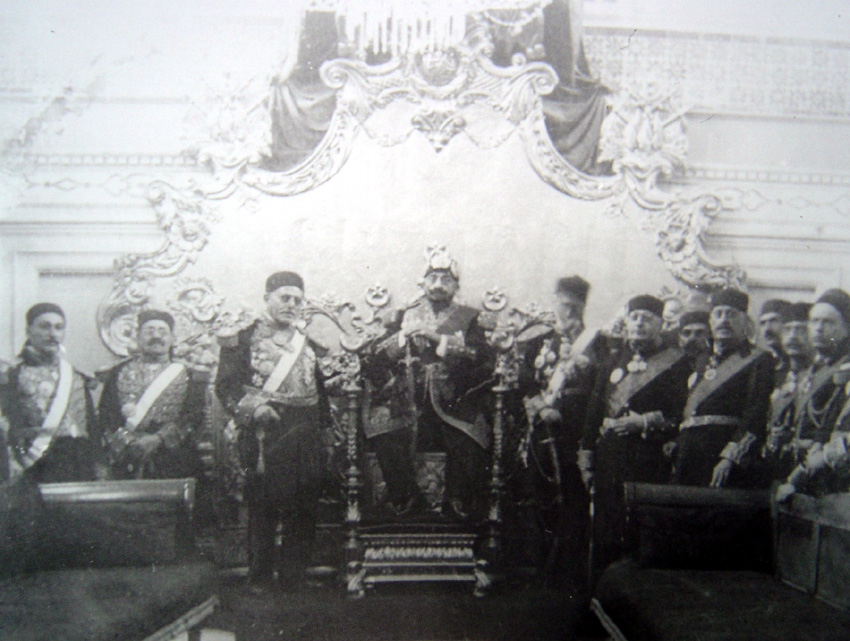
Moncef Bey with his ministers (left) and the princes (right)

On 1 January 1943, the Bey named as his new prime minister, Mohamed Chenik, who was described as 'half-American' by the German representative, Rudolf Rahn. Chenik headed a government which included the Destourian Salah Farhat, the neo-destourian Mahmoud El Materi and an independent, Aziz Djellouli.

=== Protector of the Jews ===
His predecessor Ahmed Bey was often referred to as 'the Bey of the French' and signed several decrees prepared by the Vichy regime which were detrimental to the Jewish community in Tunisia. Moncef Bey on the other hand was referred to as 'the Protector of the Jews' and made efforts to ensure that these decrees were not put into effect. He also refused to sign any other anti-Jewish decrees, including those requiring Jews to wear the yellow star, or to undertake forced labour, or to exclude Jews from certain activities. Between November 1942 and May 1943, while Axis troops occupied the country, he intervened repeatedly to protect his people, particularly the Jewish community, from their exactions.

== Deposition and exile ==
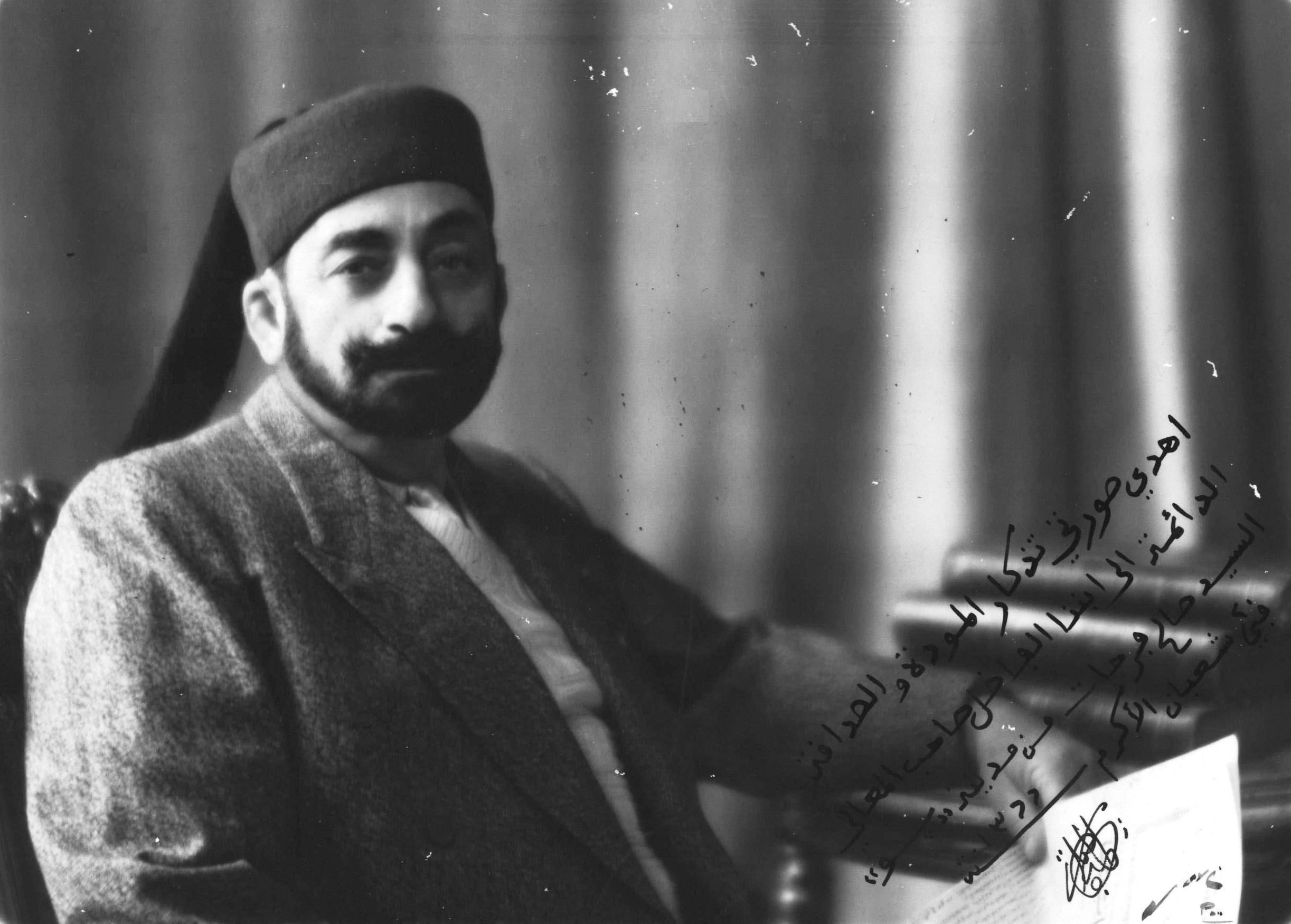
Moncef Bey at Pau, 5 October 1947

When Allied troops occupied Tunis, the French colonial lobby around Henri Giraud, including the former Resident General and Vichy minister Marcel Peyrouton, found a pretext to accuse the Bey of collaborating with Axis forces. After Esteva fled, General Alphonse Juin became acting Resident General. On 13 May 1943, on the orders of Giraud, Juin demanded the Bey's abdication, but he refused. The following day he was removed by a decree from Giraud and flown out of the country by the French airforce. He was succeeded by his second cousin, Lamine Bey, on 15 May 1943.

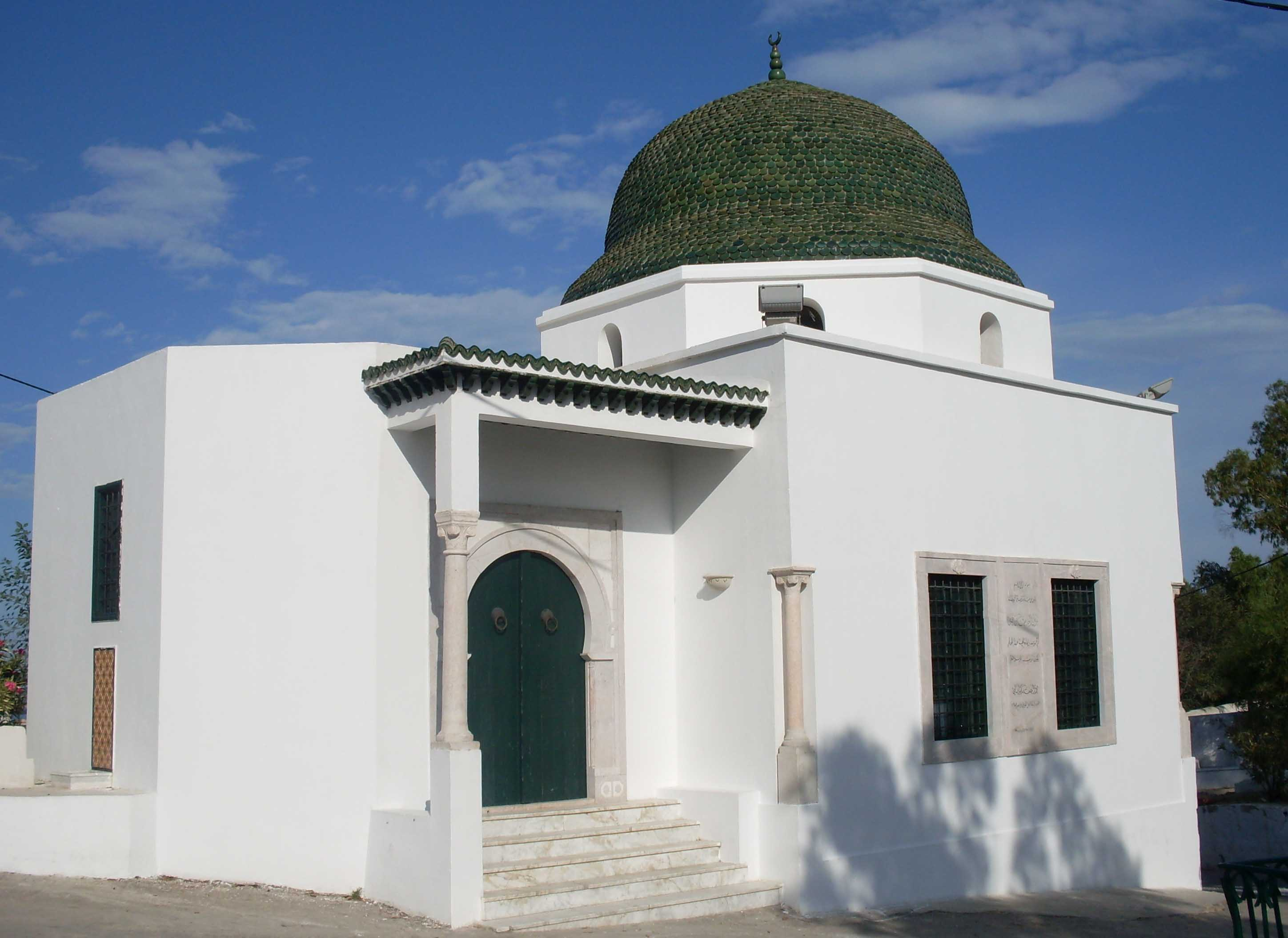
Mausoleum of Moncef Bey at the Jellaz Cemetery

Moncef Bey was sent to Laghouat in southern Algeria, where he formally abdicated on 8 July. He was then moved to the small town of Ténès, in the north of the country and on 17 October 1945 he was moved again to Pau where he remained until his death on 1 September 1948. His remains were brought back to Tunis and he was buried with full honours in the Jellaz Cemetery unlike other ruling members of his family, who were mostly buried in Tourbet el Bey.

He is commemorated today in the Place Moncef-Bey in La Marsa, formally named on 1 September 2012 by President Moncef Marzouki.

== Family and private life ==
He married Lalla Traki Beya, daughter of Muhammad IV al-Hadi (and thus his second cousin) in October 1900 in Sidi Bou Saïd. She was the mother of his four children:

- Prince Salaheddine Bey (1902–1938)
- Prince Mohammed Raouf Bey (1903–1977)
- Prince Omar Bey (1904–1938)
- Princess Lalla Farida (1911-?)

After Lalla Traki's death in 1919 he married Lalla Zoubaida (née Azzouz) and then another cousin, Lalla Habiba (1888–1969), whom he divorced. His last wife was Lalla Arbiya in August 1942, and she followed him into exile, dying in 1974.

== Bibliography ==
- Roger Casemajor, L’action nationaliste en Tunisie. Du Pacte fondamental de M’hamed Bey à la mort de Moncef Bey. 1857-1948, éd. Sud Éditions, Tunis, 2009
- Omar Khlifi, Moncef Bey, le roi martyr, éd. MC-Editions, Carthage, 2006 ISBN 9973807243
- Saïd Mestiri, Moncef Bey, éd. Sud Éditions, Tunis, 2008 ISBN 9789973844866
- Charles Saumagne, Réflexion sur la réorganisation administrative du protectorat tunisien, éd. Centre d’histoire de Sciences Po, Paris, 1943
- Sadok Zmerli, Espoirs et déceptions en Tunisie. 1942-1943, éd. Maison tunisienne de l’édition, Tunis, 1971

Preceded by Ahmad II ibn Ali	Bey of Tunis; 1942–1943	Succeeded by Muhammad VIII al-Amin
