= Sadok Ghileb =

Tunisian politician

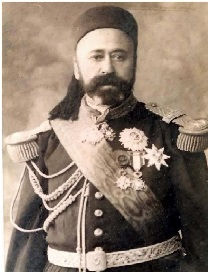

Mayor of Tunis
- Preceded by: Mohamed Asfouri
- Succeeded by: Mustapha Dinguizli

Sadok Ghileb (c. 1840–1912) was a Tunisian politician and mayor of Tunis.

== Biography ==
Ghileb was born in Tunisia around 1840, into a bourgeois family of Turkish origin. He was the maternal uncle of Mustapha Dinguizli, who succeeded him in office. During his studies at the Al-Zaytuna Mosque Ghileb became interested in politics. In 1864 he became an aide to Muhammad III as-Sadiq until he headed to City Council in Tunis as vice president in 1877. Between 1886 and 1902 he became the Governor of El Kef, of Soliman, Bizerte and Nabeul. He succeeded Mohamed Asfouri as the mayor of Tunis until his death in 1912.
