= Ali III ibn al-Husayn =

Bey of Tunis (1882–1902)

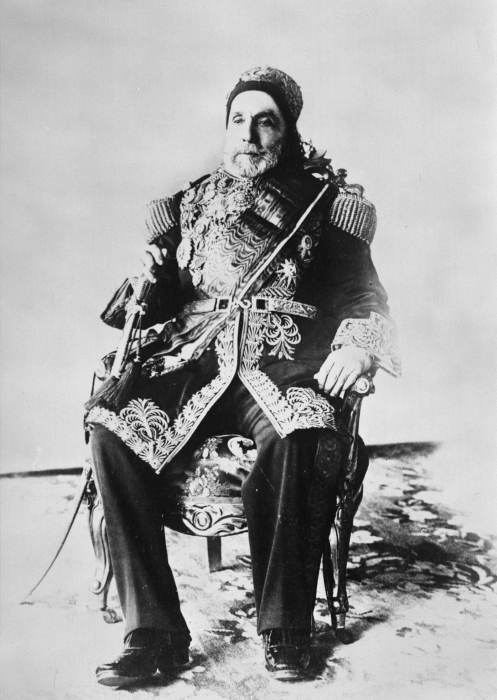
- Portrait, c. 1882–1897

Bey of Tunis
- Reign: 27 October 1882 – 11 June 1902
- Predecessor: Muhammad III as-Sadiq
- Successor: Muhammad IV al-Hadi
- Born: Ali III ibn al-Husayn Bey; 14 August 1817; Dar al-Taj Palace, La Marsa, Kingdom of Tunisia
- Died: 11 June 1902 (aged 84); Dar al-Taj Palace, La Marsa, Kingdom of Tunisia
- Burial: Tourbet el Bey, Tunis, Tunisia
- Issue: Muhammad IV al-Hadi; Ahmad II of Tunis; Sidi Moustapha Bey; Sidi Ismail Bey; Sidi Sliman Bey; Lalla Hennani; Lalla Mahbuba; Lalla Aziza; Lalla Hallouma; Lalla Hafsia; Lalla Mamia
- Dynasty: Husainides
- Father: Al-Husayn II ibn Mahmud
- Religion: Islam
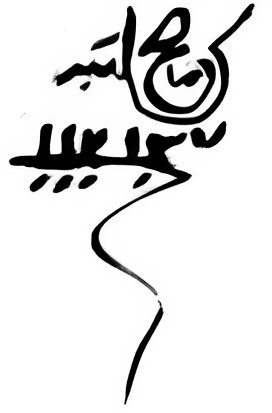
- Signature

Ali III ibn al-Husayn (Arabic: علي الثالث بن الحسين ; 14 August 1817 – 11 June 1902) commonly known as Ali III Bey (Arabic: علي باي الثالث) was the Husainid Bey of Tunis from 1882 until his death. He was the first ruler under the French protectorate.

He was named Bey al-Mahalla (Heir Apparent) on 23 August 1863 by his brother Muhammad III as-Sadiq and was made a divisional General and placed at the head of an army column operating in the interior of the country (known in Tunisian Arabic as the mhalla) to assert beylical authority in remote regions, rendering justice in the name of the sovereign and collecting taxes from local tribes. A keen horseman, Ali Bey took personal charge of this work and undertook it thoroughly, twice a year - in the north of the country during the summer in Béja and El Kef, and in the south during the winter, in Kairouan and the towns further south. During the Mejba Revolt in 1864, while his ineffective brother remained in the Bardo palace, Ali put down the rebellion with Generals Ahmed Zarrouk, Rustum and Uthman.

Following the French conquest of Tunisia and the signing of the Treaty of Bardo, Ali Bey succeeded his brother Muhammad III as-Sadiq on 29 October 1882. At the same time, he became an honorary Marshal in the army of the Ottoman Empire, as Tunisia was still nominally an Ottoman province. His first act as sovereign was to accept the resignation of his father's old mamluk, the minister Mohammed Khaznadar, and replaced him, for the first time in the country's history, with a Grand Vizier of native (i.e. non-Turkish) extraction, Mohammed Aziz Bouattour.

On 8 June 1883, together with French Resident General Paul Cambon, he signed the Conventions of La Marsa in which he formally renounced his power while retaining nominal authority., The country remained under the occupation of the French expeditionary force of General Forgemol. The entire administration of the country, as well as control of the army, police and foreign affairs, was taken over by the colonial power.

On 5 April 1885 there was a political crisis arising from Cambon's decision to revoke the existing concession to supply water to the city of Tunis, which was valid for another eighteen years, and grant a new concession to a French company in which the brother of Prime Minister Jules Ferry had an interest. The entire city council of Tunis resigned, and a mass delegation of more than 2,000 notables from the souks and the traditional authorities of the city of Tunis came to at the Dar al-Taj Palace of La Marsa, appealing for the Bey to revise the new municipal law and to repeal the water concession. The old ruler, more popular than his late brother, was overcome with emotion at his inability to act on their petition. 'You have come to weep in the house of tears' he replied to them. The colonial authorities took punitive action against the leaders of the demonstration without his being able to assist them. Cambon responded to this show of protest by sending leading figures into exile in El Kef and Gabes, and dismissing the top city officials from their posts on the grounds that they were 'fanatics hostile to the Protectorate'.

Ali Bey met Sheikh Muhammad Abduh, one of the leading jurists and reformers in the Arab world, when he came to Tunis (December 1884-January 1885) to teach at the Zitouna mosque.

Ali Bey withdrew increasingly from the affairs of state before he died. He was buried in the Tourbet el Bey mausoleum in the medina of Tunis and succeeded by his son Muhammad IV al-Hadi.

Ali III ibn al-Husayn
- Royal Family of Tunisia

Ali III Bey stamp

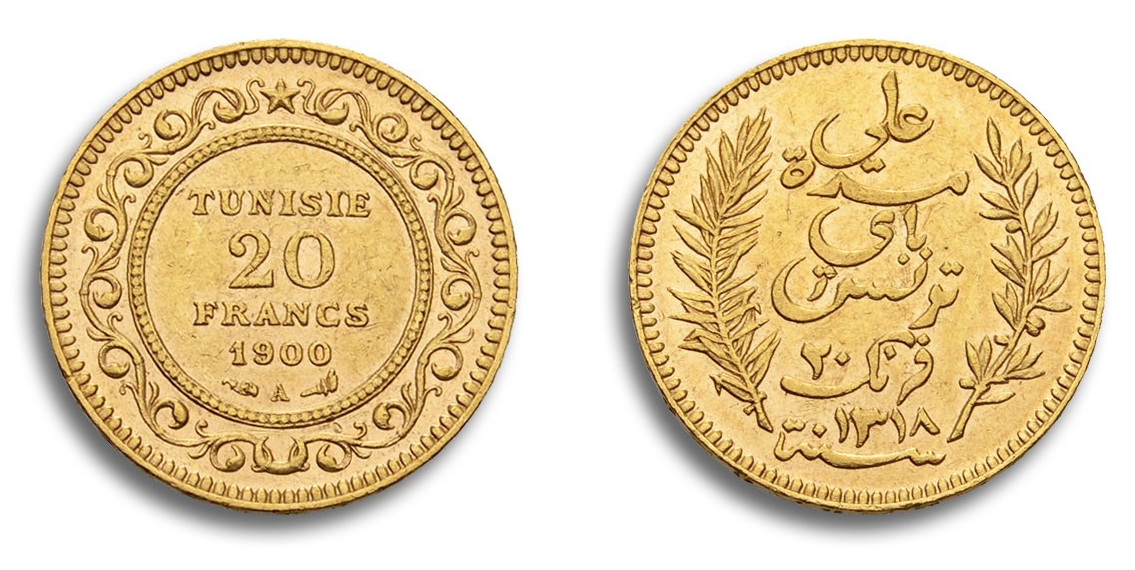
Ali III Bey Gold 20 Francs

== See also ==
- History of French-era Tunisia
- The Mejba Revolt

Preceded by Muhammad III as-Sadiq	Bey of Tunis; 1882–1902	Succeeded by Muhammad IV al-Hadi
