= Mohamed Abdelaziz Djaït =

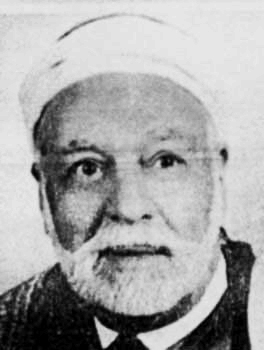
Portrait of Mohamed Abdelaziz Djaït

Mohamed Abdelaziz Dja'it (1886–1970) (Arabic: محمد عبد العزيز جعيط) was an Islamic scholar who served as Mufti of the Republic of Tunisia from 1957 to 1960.

== Early life ==
Mohamed Abdelzaziz Djaït was born in 1886 during the time of the French protectorate of Tunisia. The son of Youssef Djaït Prime Minister under the Beylik of Tunis.

== Historical significance ==
In the early period of Tunisian independence, Tunisia's first President, Habib Bourguiba, compared the new Code of Personal Status, with its associated laws on family life and women's status, to Dja'it's 1949 majalla publication in an attempt to bolster the legitimacy of the former from a religious stand-point. Dja'it issued a fatwa against the code in September 1956 but eventually acquiesced and was appointed Mufti of the Republic. He was dismissed after criticizing Bourguiba's stance on fasting.

== See also ==
- Religion in Tunisia
- Islam in Tunisia
- Maliki school
