= Mustapha Dinguizli =

Tunisian politician and reformer

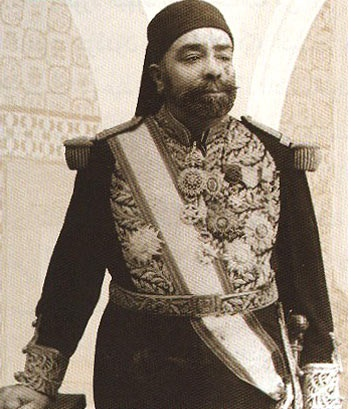

Prime Minister of Tunisia
- In office 1922–1926
- Monarch: Muhammad VI
- Preceded by: Taïeb Djellouli
- Succeeded by: Khelil Bouhageb

Minister of the Pen
- In office 1914–1922
- Monarch: Muhammad V
- Preceded by: Taïeb Djellouli
- Succeeded by: Khelil Bouhageb

Personal details
- Born: 27 August 1865 Tunis, Beylik of Tunis
- Died: 20 October 1926 (aged 61) Tunis, French Tunisia
- Relatives: Bechir Dinguizli (brother)
- Education: Sadiki College

Mustapha Dinguizli (Arabic: مصطفى الدنقزلي), (27 August 1865 – 20 October 1926) was a Tunisian politician. He was born in Tunis; he served as the first Prime Minister of Tunisia from 1922 until his death.

== Biography ==
Dinguizli was born in Tunis to a family of Turkish origin. He studied at the Collège Sadiki and then at the Ecole Normale de Versailles and the École Normale Supérieure de Fontenay-Saint-Cloud. His maternal uncle, Sadok Ghileb, was the mayor of Tunis which allowed Dinguizli to climb the ranks to the post of governor of the caid suburbs of Tunis between 1900 and 1912. After Ghileb's death, Dinguizli succeeded his uncle as head of the municipality of Tunis between 1912 and 1915. He was appointed Grand Vizier of Tunis in 1922, with the agreement of the Resident General of France. Pursuing a conciliatory policy with the authorities of the French protectorate of Tunisia, Dinguizli remained at his post until his death in 1926. He is among the ministers buried in the mausoleum of Tourbet el Bey located in the medina of Tunis.

His brother Bechir Dinguizli became the first Tunisian Muslim to become a doctor in the modern era.
