= Taïeb Djellouli =

Tunisian politician and reformer

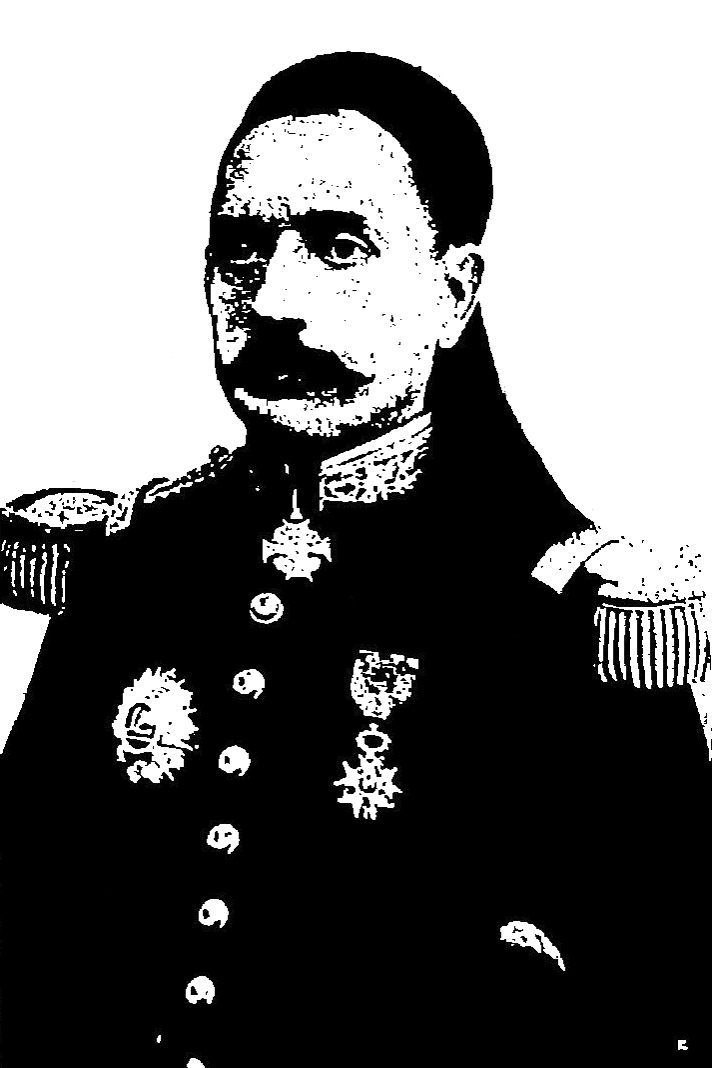

Prime Minister of Tunisia
- In office 1915–1922
- Monarch: Muhammad V
- Preceded by: Youssef Djaït
- Succeeded by: Mustapha Dinguizli

Minister of the Pen
- In office 1908–1914
- Monarch: Muhammad V
- Preceded by: Youssef Djaït
- Succeeded by: Mustapha Dinguizli

Personal details
- Born: 1857 Tunis, Beylik of Tunis
- Died: 1944 (aged 86–87) Tunis, French Tunisia
- Spouse: Lalla Seima Ben Jaafar
- Children: Aziz Djellouli

Taïeb Djellouli (1857-1944) was a Tunisian politician. A member of an aristocratic Tunisian family, he served as the last Grand Vizier of the Beylik of Tunis from 1915 until 1922. His son Aziz Djellouli became a well-known businessman.

== Biography ==
Taïeb Djellouli was born into an influential patrician family belonging to the Tunisian aristocracy. With his studies at Sadiki College, he is among the college's alumni to continue their studies in France, thus entering the new group of westernized and reformist intelligentsia.

He began his career as a caïd of Sousse in the year 1881. In 1908, he was appointed as Minister of the Pen and president of habous under the reign of Naceur Bey. He finally became grand vizier between 1915 and 1922.

Naceur Bey, who makes him responsible for the April 1922 crisis, tries to remove him from his post but the general resident objects to it. The crisis follows the misrepresentation of the Bey by pro-colonial newspapers where the sovereign, yet sympathetic Destourian, criticizes the policy of Destour. The bey, feeling humiliated and forced to deny his sympathies, threatens to abdicate and not to receive the French president visiting Tunis if Djellouli and the director of the protocol, Khairallah Ben Mustapha, do not resign. Influenced by his son Moncef and other Destour princes, Naceur Bey suspects they favor the point of view of the resident general. The latter finally yielded on the ministers: Djellouli is replaced by the Minister of the Pen Mustapha Dinguizli. In order to recognize his services, the Bey signs a decree appointing him Grand Vizier Honorary.

His son Aziz would later become a businessman, minister and president of the Tunisian Red Crescent.
