= Mohammed Khaznadar =

Tunisian politician and reformer

Prime Minister of Tunisia
- In office 21 July 1878 – 24 August 1878
- Monarch: Muhammad III
- Preceded by: Kheireddine Pacha
- Succeeded by: Mustapha Ben Ismaïl
- In office 12 September 1881 – October 1882
- Monarch: Muhammad III
- Preceded by: Mustapha Ben Ismaïl
- Succeeded by: Mohammed Aziz Bouattour

Personal details
- Born: c. 1810 Kos, Ottoman Greece
- Died: 22 June 1889 (aged 78–79) La Marsa, French Tunisia
- Spouse: Lalla Mannana Cherif
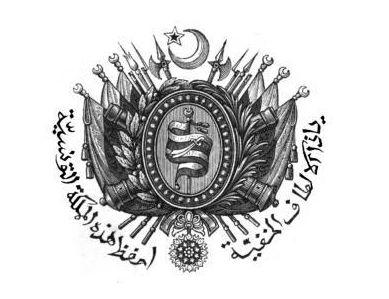

Mohammed Khaznadar (Arabic: محمد خزندار; born around 1810 on the island of Kos (modern Greece) and died on 1889 at La Marsa was a Tunisian politician.

== Biography ==
A Mamluk of Greek origin, he was captured in a raid and bought as a slave by the Bey of Tunis: Hussein II Bey.

Later on he became treasurer to Chakir Saheb Ettabaâ and was qaid of Sousse and Monastir from 1838. He remained for fifty years in one post or another in the service of five successive beys. In November 1861 he was named Minister of the Interior, then Minister of War in December 1862, Minister of the Navy in September 1865, Minister of the Interior again in October 1873 and finally Prime Minister and President of the International Financial Commission from 22 July 1877 to 24 August 1878. He retained also the title of minister and the functions of a councillor of state and returned to the vizierate on 12 September 1881. He retired from public life to his properties at La Marsa and Sidi Bou Said in the autumn of 1882, after the establishment of the French protectorate of Tunisia, leaving behind the impression of a self-sacrificing and loyal statesman.

He is unrelated to his contemporary Mustapha Khaznadar; Khaznadar (خزندار) is a surname meaning "Treasurer". Such surnames were derived from a person's original job, most well-known job, or their geographic origin.

Preceded by Hayreddin Pasha	Prime Minister of Tunisia; 22 July 1877 – 24 August 1878	Succeeded by Mustapha Ben Ismaïl
Preceded by Mustapha Ben Ismaïl	Prime Minister of Tunisia; 12 september 1881 – 1882	Succeeded by Mohammed Aziz Bouattour
