= Husainid dynasty =

Ruling dynasty of Tunisia from 1705 to 1957

- Country: Beylik of Tunis; Kingdom of Tunisia
- Founded: 15 July 1705
- Founder: Hussein I
- Current head: Muhammad XI Habib
- Final ruler: Muhammad VIII al-Amin
- Titles: Bey, King of Tunisia
- Deposition: 25 July 1957

The Husainid dynasty or Husaynid dynasty (Arabic: الحسينيون) was a ruling Ottoman dynasty of the Beylik of Tunis (present-day Tunisia). The dynasty was of Greek origin from the island of Crete. It came to power under al-Husayn I ibn Ali in 1705, succeeding the Muradid dynasty. The Husainids ruled Tunisia until 1957 before the establishment of the Republic.

The Husainids originally ruled under the suzerainty of the Ottoman Empire. The Ottoman sultans officially regarded them as beylerbeyis (provincial governors) and recognized their rights to hereditary succession. Their succession to the throne was in theory determined by male primogeniture, but this was not always followed and, especially in later periods, the throne was often granted to an older male family member along the collateral branches of the family. The heir apparent to the Bey held the title Bey al-Mahalla and led the mahalla, a biannual tax collection expedition around the country.

== History ==
After Husayn I ibn Ali was granted the title of beylerbeyi by Sultan Ahmed III in 1705, the Husaynid beys ruled with effective independence from the Ottomans, even going so far as to form separate diplomatic agreements with European powers such as France, Great Britain, and the Italian states. Their independence was strengthened in the 19th century, especially after Hammuda Pasha suppressed the local Janissary Corps in 1811 after a revolt. Nonetheless, they were able to retain advantageous relations with the Ottomans, sometimes requesting protection from them and at other times sending troops to assist in Ottoman wars.

Under the reigns of Ahmed I Bey (r. 1837–1855), Muhammad II Bey (r. 1855–1859), and Muhammad III as-Sadiq (r. 1859–1882), efforts were made at significant reforms. In 1845, with French support, Ahmad I Bey ended the regular payments of tribute to Istanbul, but continued to receive the official titles of wali and mushir and to maintain a semblance of Ottoman authority. Ahmad also abolished slavery and removed the statutes that kept Tunisian Jews legally inferior. The abolition of the slave trade and the commission of major public works incurred large debts, which were mainly held by European (especially French) interests and businessmen. On 10 September 1857, Muhammad II Bey enacted the "Fundamental Pact" (Arabic: عهد الأمان, romanized: 'Ahd al-Amān, lit. 'Security Covenant'), modeled on the Ottoman Tanzimat reforms. In 1861 Muhammad III as-Sadiq promulgated a new constitution which transformed Tunisia into a constitutional monarchy, with a legislative assembly. The state's financial situation worsened, however, which led to raised taxes, rebellions, and larger debts. In 1869 Muhammad as-Sadiq was forced to consent to the creation of an "international financial commission" (composed of Tunisia, France, United Kingdom and Italy) that oversaw management of the country's debt.

French intervention and pressure continued to increase. In 1881, following a French invasion and occupation, the Treaty of Bardo was signed and Tunisia came under the control of France as a protectorate. Following independence from France on 20 March 1956, the Bey Muhammad VIII al-Amin assumed the title of King and reigned as such until the Prime Minister Habib Bourguiba deposed the dynasty and declared Tunisia a republic on 25 July 1957.

Since June 2013, the current head of the dynasty is Prince Muhammad al-Habib Bey (born 1929), who is a grandson of Muhammad VI al-Habib.

== Ruling heads of the dynasty ==
- Al-Husayn I ibn Ali (15 July 1705 – 7 September 1735)
- 'Abu'l Hasan 'Ali I (7 September 1735 – 22 September 1756)
- Muhammad I ar-Rashid (22 September 1756 – 11 February 1759)
- Ali II ibn Hussein (11 February 1759 – 26 May 1782)
- Hammuda ibn Ali (26 May 1782 – 15 September 1814)
- Uthman ibn Ali (15 September – 21 November 1814)
- Mahmud ibn Muhammad (21 November 1814 – 28 March 1824)
- Al-Husayn II ibn Mahmud (28 March 1824 – 20 May 1835)
- Al-Mustafa ibn Mahmud (20 May 1835 – 10 October 1837)
- Ahmad I ibn Mustafa (10 October 1837 – 30 May 1855)
- Muhammad II ibn al-Husayn (30 May 1855 – 22 September 1859)
- Muhammad III as-Sadiq (22 September 1859 – 27 October 1882)
- Ali III Muddat ibn al-Husayn (28 October 1882 – 11 June 1902)
- Muhammad IV al-Hadi (11 June 1902 – 11 May 1906)
- Muhammad V an-Nasir (11 May 1906 – 10 July 1922)
- Muhammad VI al-Habib (10 July 1922 – 11 February 1929)
- Ahmad II ibn Ali (11 February 1929 – 19 June 1942)
- Muhammad VII al-Munsif (19 June 1942 – 15 May 1943)
- Muhammad VIII al-Amin (15 May 1943 – 25 July 1957)

== Non ruling heads of the dynasty ==
- Muhammad al-Amin (Muhammad VIII al-Amin) (1957 –1962)
- Crown Prince Husain Bey (Husain III) (1962 - 1969)
- Prince Mustafa Bey (Mustafa II) (1969 – 1974)
- Prince Muhammad al-Taib Bey (Muhammad IX al-Taib) (1974 –1989)
- Prince Sulaiman Bey (Sulaiman I) (1989 – 1992)
- Prince 'Allalah Bey (Allalah I) (1992 – 2001)
- Prince Shazli Bey (Shazli I) (2001 – 2004)
- Prince Muhi ud-din Bey (Muhi ud-din I) (2004 – 2006)
- Prince Muhammad Bey (Muhammad X) (2006 – 2013)
- Prince Muhammad al-Habib Bey (Muhammad XI al-Habib) (2013 – present)

=== Family tree ===
- Sidi Ali al-Turki (d. 1676)
  - Muhammad (c. 1665–1735)
    - II. Ali I (1688–1756; r. 1735–1756)
  - I. Hussein I (1675–1740; r. 1705–1735)
    - III. Muhammad I (1710–1759; r. 1756–1759)
      - VII. Mahmud I (1757–1824; r. 1814–1824)
        - VIII. Hussein II (1784–1835; r. 1824–1835)
          - XI. Muhammad II (1811–1859; r. 1855–1859)
            - Prince Hussein Bey (1839–1890)
              - Prince Muhammad as-Said Bey (1873–1918)
                - XXI. Mustafa II (1900–1974; family head: 1969–1974)
            - XV. Muhammad V (1855–1922; r. 1906–1922)
              - XVIII. Muhammad VII (1881–1948; r. 1942–1943)
                - Prince Salah ud-din (1902–1938)
                  - Prince Zainal-Abidin (1930–2018)
              - XX. Hussein III (1893–1969; Crown Prince: 1943–1957; family head: 1962–1969)
              - Prince Muhammad Bey (1897–1953)
                - XXVII. Muhammad X (1928–2013; family head: 2006–2013)
          - XII. Muhammad III (1813–1882; r. 1859–1882)
          - XIII. Ali III (1817–1902; r. 1882–1902)
            - Prince Mustafa Bey (1844–1895)
              - Prince Iz ud-din Bey (1882–1953)
                - XXIII. Suleiman I (1909–1992; family head: 1989–1992)
                - XXIV. Al'Allah I (1910–2001; family head: 1992–2001)
                - XXVI. Muhi ud-din I (1911–2006; family head: 2004–2006)
            - XIV. Muhammad IV (1855–1906; r. 1902–1906)
            - XVII. Ahmad II (1862–1942; r. 1929–1942)
              - XXII. Muhammad IX (1902–1989; family head: 1974–1989)
          - Prince Muhammad Mamun Bey (1819–1861)
            - XVI. Muhammad VI (1858–1929; r. 1922–1929)
              - Prince Muhammad Iz ud-din Bey (1875–1931)
                - XXVIII. Muhammad XI (b. 1929; family head: 2013-present)
              - XIX. Muhammad VIII (1881–1962; r. 1943–1957; family head: 1957–1962)
                - XXV. Shazli I (1910–2004; family head: 2001–2004)
        - IX. Mustafa I (1786–1837; r. 1835–1837)
          - X. Ahmad I (1806–1855; r. 1837–1855)
    - IV. Ali II (1712–1782; r. 1759–1782)
      - V. Hammud I (1759–1814; r. 1782–1814)
      - VI. Uthman I (1763–1814; r. 1814)

== See also ==
- Beylik of Tunis
- Kingdom of Tunisia
- Ottoman Crete
  - Cretan Turks
- List of Sunni Muslim dynasties
