= Aziz Djellouli =

Tunisian politician and businessman

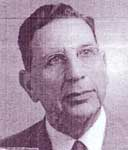
Mohammed Aziz Djellouli

Mohammed Aziz Djellouli (Tunis, December 14, 1896 – Radès, 1975) was a Tunisian politician and businessman. He served for a time as chairman of the Red Crescent in Tunisia, and an administrator of the Central Bank of Tunisia under Hédi Nouira.

== Personal life ==
Djellouli was born into a wealthy family of Arab origin; his father, Taïeb Djellouli, served as the Prime Minister of Tunisia from 1915 until 1922 and his mother was from a notable family of Turkish origin.
