= Hédi Lakhoua =

Tunisian politician (1872–1949)

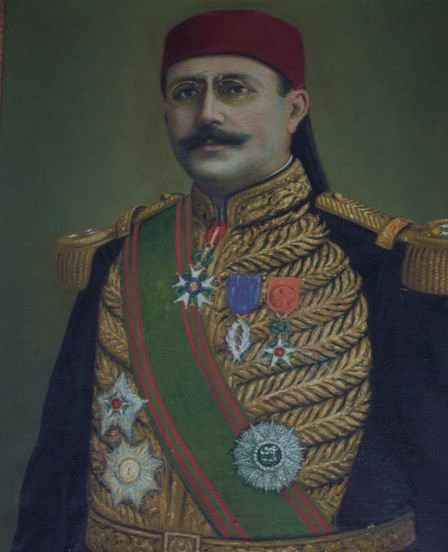

Prime Minister of Tunisia
- In office 1932 – 31 December 1942
- Monarchs: Ahmad II; Muhammad VII
- Preceded by: Khelil Bouhageb
- Succeeded by: Mohamed Chenik

Personal details
- Born: 15 September 1872 Tunis, Beylik of Tunis
- Died: 1 January 1949 (aged 76) Tunis, French Tunisia
- Spouse: Khedija Mbazaa

Mohamed Hédi Lakhoua (15 September 1872 – 1 January 1949) was a Tunisian politician. A native of Tunis, he died in that city. He served as Prime Minister of Tunisia from 1932 until 1942.

== Biography ==
Mohamed Hédi Lakhoua comes from a family of the Tunisian upper middle class of Moorish origin who has provided a long line of master craftsmen of Chechia among the most famous of the country; his father however follows an administrative career prolonged by his descent. After graduating from Sadiki College [1], he held several positions such as secretary at the general directorate of public education, between 1890 and 1892, and secretary-interpreter at the Tunis Municipality from 1892. He was editor and then deputy chief of office, before being called to the general administration in 1913 then, in 1916, as head of section to the accounting. Delegate of the mayor of Tunis Khelil Bouhageb in 1922, he served as head of the state section before being appointed minister of the pen in November 1926.

In 1927, he was made commander of the Legion of Honor.
