= Muhammad IV al-Hadi =

Bey of Tunis (1902–1906)

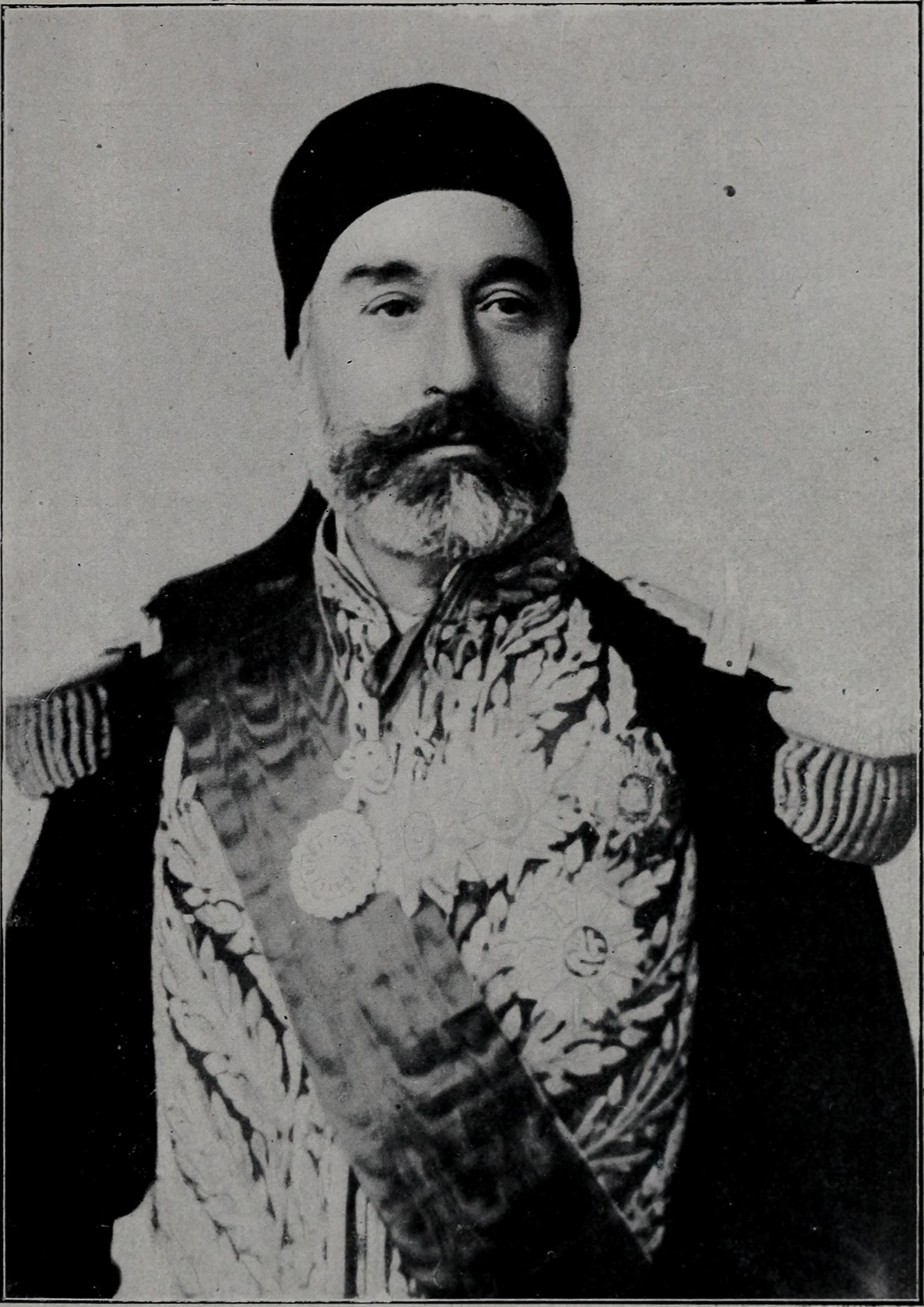

Bey of Tunis
- Reign: 11 June 1902 – 11 May 1906
- Predecessor: Ali III ibn al-Husayn
- Successor: Muhammad V an-Nasir
- Born: Muhammad IV al-Hadi Bey; 24 June 1855; Le Bardo, Kingdom of Tunisia
- Died: 11 May 1906 (aged 50); Carthage, Kingdom of Tunisia
- Burial: Tourbet el Bey, Tunis, Tunisia
- Issue: Taher Bey; Bechir Bey
- Dynasty: Husainides
- Father: Ali III ibn al-Husayn
- Religion: Islam

Muhammad IV al-Hadi (Arabic: محمد الرابع الهادي), commonly referred to as Hédi Bey (Arabic: الهادي باي ; 24 June 1855 in Le Bardo – 11 May 1906 in Carthage) was the son of Ali III ibn al-Husayn and the fourteenth Husainid Bey of Tunis, ruling from 1902 until his death.

He was named Bey al-Mahalla (Heir Apparent) on 3 December 1898 and succeeded as Bey of Tunis on the day of his predecessor's death, 11 June 1902, at a ceremony in the throne room of the palace in Tunis, in the presence of the French resident. Before the French protectorate of Tunisia the Ottoman sultan had bestowed honorific military ranks on the Bey of Tunis and his Heir Apparent. Hédi Bey did not receive such an honour, but was instead made Divisional General of the Beylical Guard when he became Heir Apparent, and became Marshal on his accession.

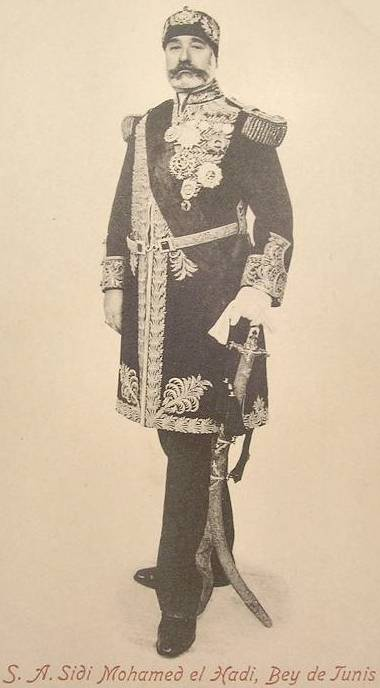
Portrait of Muhammad IV al-Hadi

Following a dispute in 1904 with the French Resident General Stephen Pichon over the dismissal of his Grand Vizier Mohammed Aziz Bouattour, he suffered a stroke which caused paralysis of his lower limbs. Shortly before his death, the first violent resistance to authority since the start of the protectorate took place in the Thala-Kasserine Disturbances. He died in his palace at Carthage Dermech and was buried in the Tourbet el Bey mausoleum in the medina of Tunis. He was succeeded by his cousin Muhammad V an-Nasir.

Muhammad IV al-Hadi
- Royal Family of Tunisia

== See also ==
- History of French-era Tunisia

Preceded by Ali Muddat ibn al-Husayn	Bey of Tunis; 1902–1906	Succeeded by Muhammad V an-Nasir
