= Muhammad III as-Sadiq =

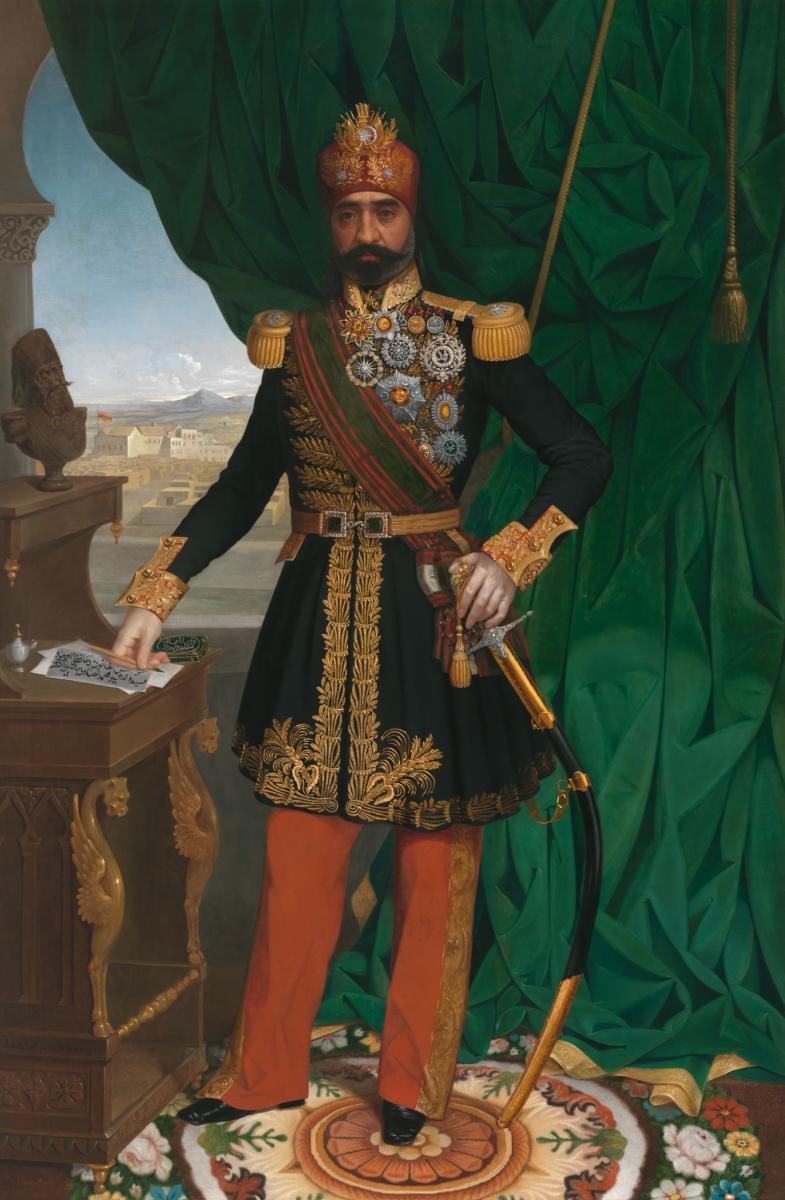
- Portrait by Louis Simil, 1865

Bey of Tunis
- Reign: 22 September 1859 – 27 October 1882
- Predecessor: Muhammad II ibn al-Husayn
- Successor: Ali III ibn al-Husayn
- Born: Muhammad III as-Sadiq Bey; 7 February 1813; Le Bardo, Kingdom of Tunisia
- Died: 27 October 1882 (aged 69); Le Bardo, Kingdom of Tunisia
- Burial: Tourbet el Bey, Tunis, Tunisia
- Spouse: Lalla Kmar (1877–1882)
- Dynasty: Husainides
- Father: Al-Husayn II ibn Mahmud
- Mother: Lalla Fatima al-Munastiri
- Religion: Islam

Muhammad III as-Sadiq GCB (Arabic: محمد الثالث الصادق; 7 February 1813 – 27 October 1882) commonly known as Sadok Bey (Arabic: الصادق باي), was the Husainid Bey of Tunis from 1859 until his death. Invested as Bey al-Mahalla (Heir Apparent) on 10 June 1855, he succeeded his brother Muhammad II ibn al-Husayn on 23 September 1859. Named as divisional General in the Imperial Ottoman Army on 10 June 1855, he was promoted to the rank of Marshal on 10 December 1859.

== Reign ==
In July 1860, the Bey was persuaded by the British consul, Richard Wood, to allow a British subject named Holt to set up the first official printing press, as well as the first Arabic-language newspaper in the country, the ar-Ra'id at-Tūnisi. A telegraph concession was established, with a French interest taking it up in 1859.

On 23 April 1861 he promulgated the first written constitution in the Arab world, separating executive, legislative and judiciary powers, through a new Supreme Council, legislature and court system, thus limiting the powers of the Bey. This constitution guaranteed equality of rights to Muslims, Christians (effectively, therefore, to Europeans) and to Jews; in particular, concerning the right to own property. This created a new legal environment which encouraged Europeans to set up businesses in Tunisia; thus new French traders appeared, along with non-Muslim religious schools.

On 26 April 1861, the Bey changed the order of succession to the throne; henceforth it would be the oldest prince in the beylical family who would inherit, rather than the oldest son of the late sovereign.

Muhammad III as-Sadiq
- Royal Family of Tunisia

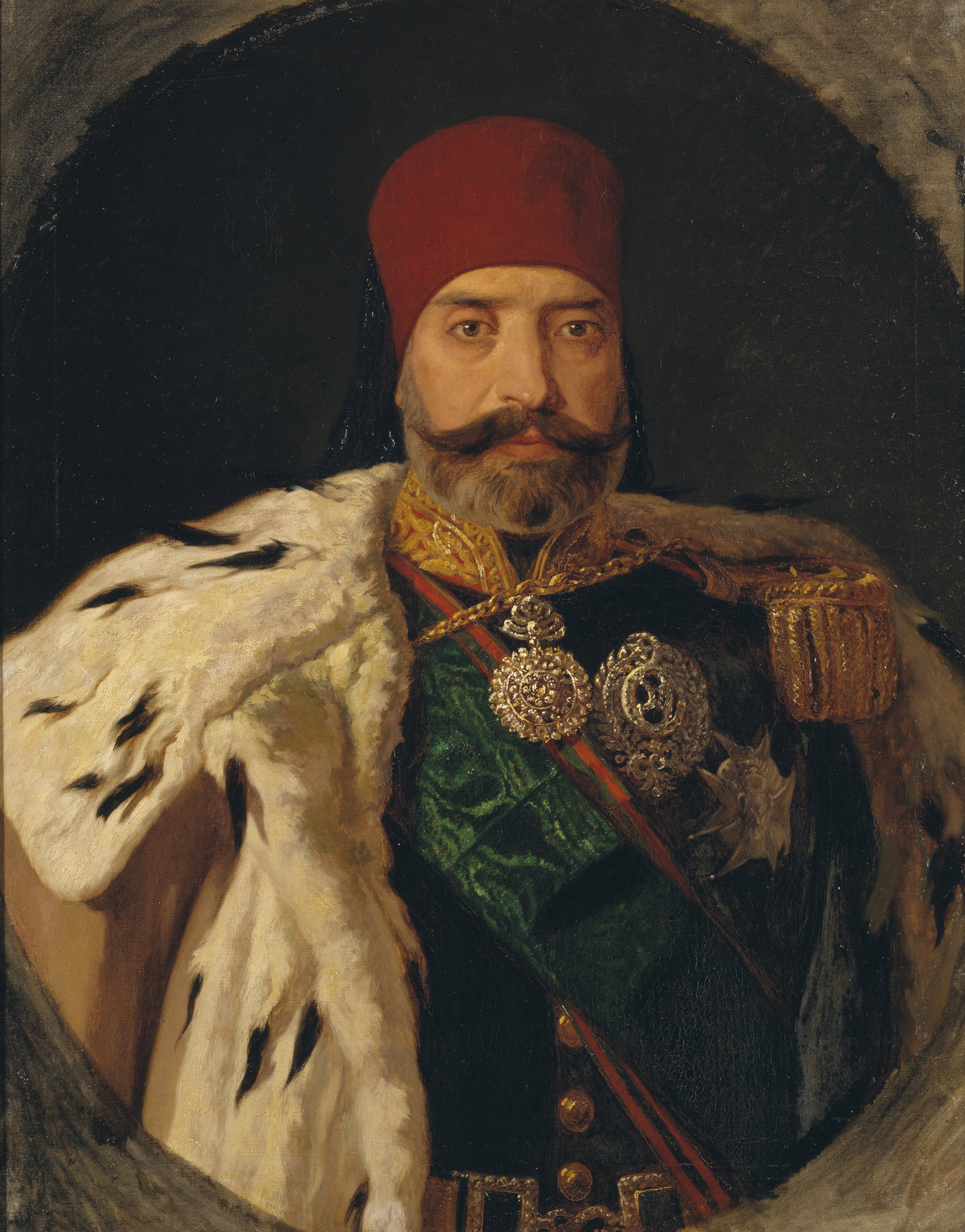
Portrait of Sadok Bey by Johan Fredrik Höckert, 1862

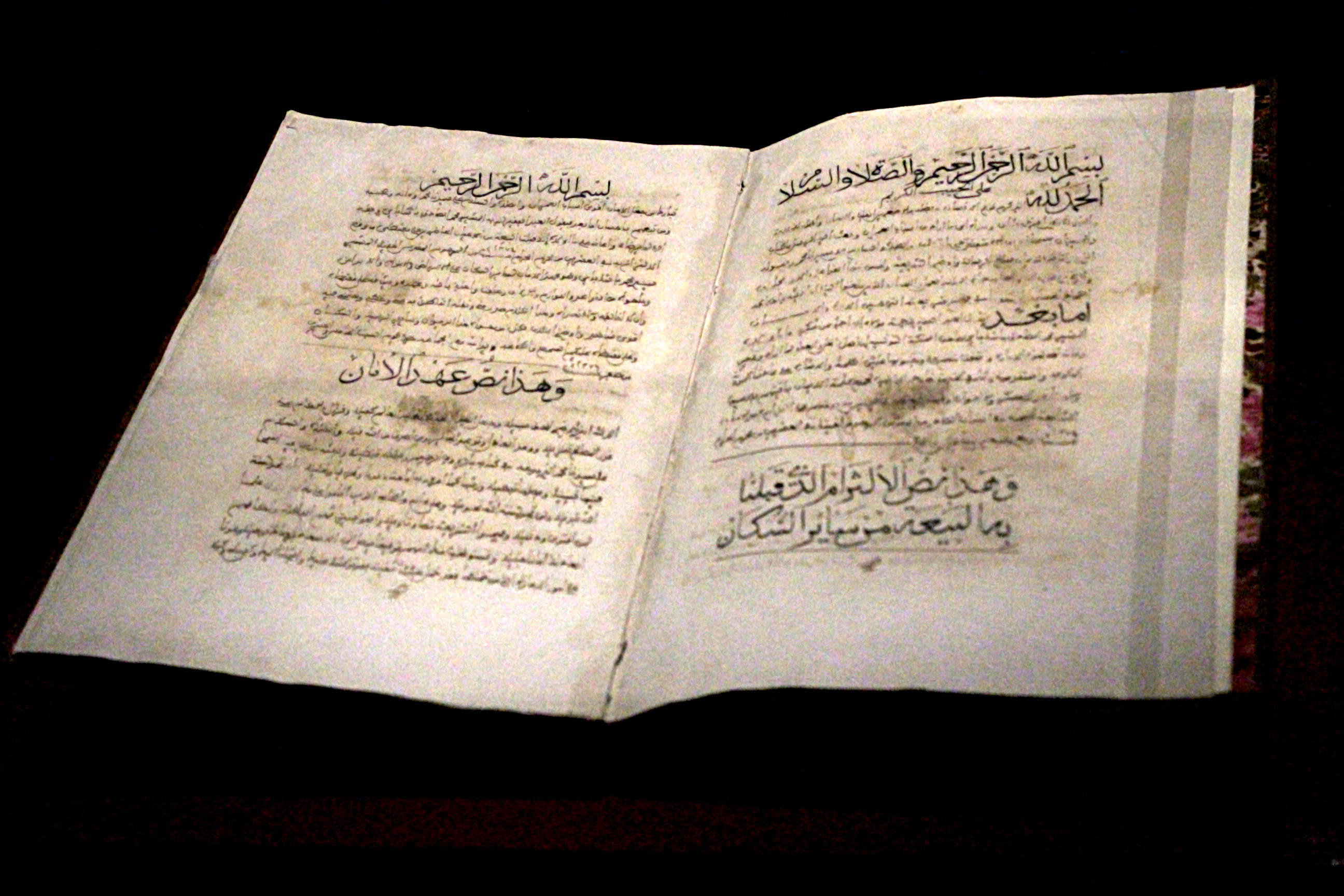
"Ahd al-Amān" The First Constitution in Tunisia and Africa, 1861

Since the time of Hammouda Pasha two hundred years before, French interests in Tunisia had been housed in the Fondouk of French, a caravanserai in the medina. Now the Tunisian government had a new French consulate built, on what was to become the Avenue de la Marine (now Avenue Habib Bourguiba), and it was formally opened by the Bey on 12 January 1862.

The Bey commissioned the Marseille engineer Colin to repair the Zaghouan aqueduct providing

a fresh water supply to the capital. In 1865 he began demolishing the walls around the medina, some of which were so unsound they threatened to collapse. It is during this period that Tunis lost a number of its historic gates - Bab Cartagena, Bab Souika, Bab Bnet and Bab El Jazira. The bronze cannon on the city walls and the fortifications of La Goulette were sold off in 1872. Europeans began to settle near the former Bab el Bhar, in streets close to the old walls and along the Avenue de la Marine, now planted with fig trees. Room for building was limited in nearby areas by European cemeteries, particularly opposite the new consulate building, and by market gardens along the Lake of Tunis which extended as far towards the city as the present Avenue de Carthage. However, intrigues among his ministers, notably Mustapha Khaznadar and Mustapha Ben Ismaïl, constant pressure from European consuls and the looming bankruptcy of the state, provoked the Mejba Revolt of 1864, compelled him to secure debts which he could not repay, and opened the door to foreign occupation despite the efforts of his Grand Vizier Kheireddine Pacha.

France gained an important foothold in Tunisia in 1869 by means of a tripartite Debt Commission, constituted with the United Kingdom and Italy to manage the country's financial commitments to its creditors. In April 1881, a border incident with French Algeria involving raids by Khroumire tribesmen who were subjects of the Bey provided the final pretext for the dispatch of a French expeditionary force which took El Kef, and for the landing of French troops at Bizerte on 1 May. The French army occupied Tunis on 11 May. The Bey was therefore compelled to sign the Treaty of Bardo on 12 May, establishing the French protectorate of Tunisia.

== Private life ==
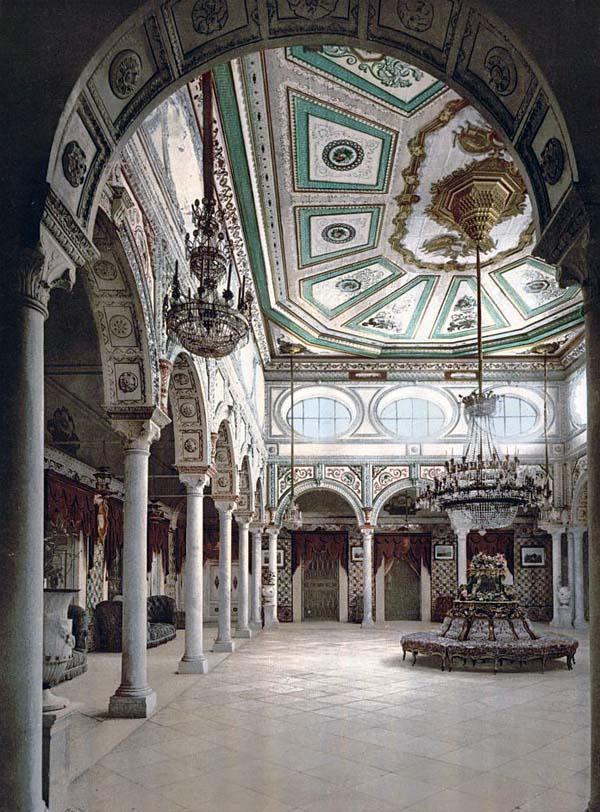
Private chambers of Muhammad III as-Sadiq in Ksar Said

Muhammad as-Sadiq had several wives. The first was his cousin, the daughter of the Qaid Ahmed al-Munastiri, from a Turkish family which had been influential in the harem of the Beys of Tunis throughout the century; her mother and grandmother were respectively the second wives of Hussein II Bey et Mahmud ibn Muhammad. His second wife was Henani, daughter of Ali Laroussi, a rich merchant dealing in traditional Tunisian Chechia headgear. He also married a Circassian odalisque Lella Kmar, who was a gift from the Ottoman sultan.

His main residence was the Ksar Said palace, built in an Italianate style in front of the Bardo palace. It had been confiscated from the former minister and Keeper of the Seals, Ismail as-Sunni, who was accused of treason and executed in 1867. (This minister was the maternal grandfather of the future Moncef Bey). It was to one of the first floor staterooms of this palace that, on 12 May 1881, the French consul Théodore Roustan brought the French General Jules Aimé Bréart to the Bey's privy council to secure his signature on the Treaty of Bardo. In his later years, the Bey fell under the influence Mustapha Ben Ismaïl, and died without issue. He was buried in the Tourbet el Bey mausoleum in the medina of Tunis. He was succeeded by his brother Ali III ibn al-Husayn.

=== Homosexuality of the bey ===
According to writer Nizar Ben Saad, the Bey had numerous liaisons with male ministers from his court, the most notable being with his Grand Vizier, Mustapha Ben Ismaïl. The Bey's private meetings were always held at night in Dar El Bey to avoid being seen. Furthermore, his marriage to Lella Kmar was never consummated, making it easier for her to marry his brother, Ali Bey, after his death.

=== Descendants ===
The Bey died without leaving any children to inherit the throne. However, he adopted his nephew, Muhammad V an-Nasir, and married Jnaina, the widow of his vizier, Ismail Ben Mustapha.

== Honours ==
- Beylik of Tunis: Founder of the Order of the Fundamental Pact, 16 January 1860
- Ottoman Empire:
  - Order of the Medjidie, 1st Class in Diamonds, 10 January 1860
  - Order of Osmanieh, 1st Class in Diamonds, 27 April 1862
- Austrian Empire:
  - Grand Cross of the Imperial Order of Leopold, 1862
  - Grand Cross of the Royal Hungarian Order of St. Stephen, 1870
- Kingdom of Bavaria: Grand Cross of Merit of the Bavarian Crown, 1870
- Belgium: Grand Cordon of the Order of Leopold (civil), 6 February 1861
- Denmark: Grand Cross of the Dannebrog, 23 June 1860
- French Empire: Grand Cross of the Legion of Honour, in Diamonds, 17 September 1860
- Kingdom of Hawaii: Grand Cross of the Order of Kalākaua, July 1881
- Kingdom of Italy: Knight of the Annunciation, 16 November 1862
- Monaco: Grand Cross of St. Charles, 28 December 1864
- Netherlands: Grand Cross of the Netherlands Lion, 14 August 1861
- Kingdom of Prussia: Grand Cross of the Red Eagle, 9 February 1863
- Spain:
  - Grand Cross of the Order of Isabella the Catholic, 23 December 1862
  - Grand Cross of the Order of Charles III, 8 November 1864
  - Knight of the Golden Fleece, 31 October 1870
- Sweden-Norway:
  - Commander Grand Cross of the Order of Vasa, 7 September 1860
  - Grand Cross of St. Olav, 2 May 1865
- United Kingdom: Honorary Grand Cross of the Bath (civil), 1 June 1865

== See also ==
- History of the Jews in Tunisia
- Ottoman Tunisia
- History of French-era Tunisia
- The Mejba Revolt

Preceded by Muhammad II ibn al-Husayn	Bey of Tunis; 1859–1882	Succeeded by Ali III ibn al-Husayn
