= Bey al-Mahalla =

Coat of arms of the Beys of Tunis (Husainid dynasty)

Bey al-Mahalla (Arabic: باي المحلّة) meaning Bey of the Camp, was a title for the heir apparent to throne of the Beylik of Tunis. The title was given to the most senior member of the Beylical family after the reigning Bey. The title came the style of Highness. The last person to carry this title was Prince Husain Bey, Bey al-Mahalla, heir apparent to Tunisia from 1955 until the abolition of the monarchy in 1957. From Tunisia's independence on March 20, 1956 he was given the new title of Crown Prince.
