= Muhammad V an-Nasir =

Bey of Tunis (1855–1922)

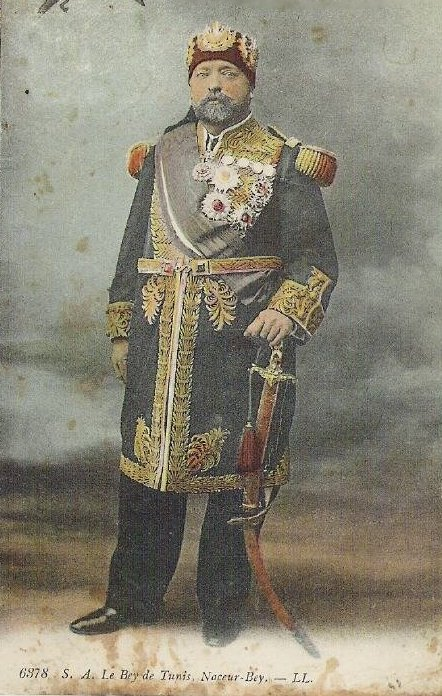

Bey of Tunis
- Reign: 11 May 1906 – 8 July 1922
- Predecessor: Muhammad IV al-Hadi
- Successor: Muhammad VI al-Habib
- Born: Muhammad V an-Nasir Bey; 14 July 1855; Dar al-Taj Palace, La Marsa, Kingdom of Tunisia
- Died: 8 July 1922 (aged 66); Dar al-Taj Palace, La Marsa, Kingdom of Tunisia
- Burial: Tourbet el Bey, Tunis, Tunisia
- Spouse: Lalla Kmar Beya (1908–d. 1922)
- Issue: Muhammad VII al-Munsif; Husain Bey, Crown Prince of Tunisia; Lalla Aziza; Lalla Khadija; Lalla Assia; Lalla Zainab; Lalla Taj el-Bakhta; Sidi Mohamed el-Hachemi Bey; Sidi Hassine Bey; Sidi M'hamed Bey; Lalla Djeneïna
- Dynasty: Husainides
- Father: Muhammad II ibn al-Husayn
- Religion: Islam

Muhammad V an-Nasir (Arabic: محمد الخامس الناصر), commonly known as Naceur Bey (Arabic: الناصر باي ; 14 July 1855 in La Marsa – 8 July 1922 in La Marsa) was the son of Muhammad II ibn al-Husayn and the fifteenth Husainid Bey of Tunis, ruling from 1906 until his death. He was named Divisional General of the Beylical army when he became Bey al-Mahalla (Heir Apparent) on 11 June 1902, and assumed the rank of Marshal when he succeeded Muhammad IV al-Hadi on 11 May 1906.

The reign of Naceur Bey saw increasing tension between the authorities of the French Protectorate and the Tunisian population. Shortly before he succeeded as Bey, the Thala-Kasserine Disturbances broke out and a few years later the discontent escalated to include major incidents such as the Jellaz Affair and the Tunis Tram Boycott. The French managed to secure from him a decree expelling the leaders of the Tunisian national movement, Ali Bach Hamba, Hassan Guelati, Mohamed Nomane and Abdelaziz Thâalbi from the country in March 1912.

Increasingly dissatisfied with the way the authorities were treating the Destour, in April 1922 he threatened to abdicate if France did not meet their demands, including the repeal of French laws on naturalisation. In response, the French Resident General Lucien Saint surrounded the Bey's palace with troops in order to put pressure on him not to do so. With his hand forced, he complied with the wishes of the French. Humiliated by this experience, he died on 8 July.

He was buried in the mausoleum of Tourbet el Bey in the medina of Tunis. He was succeeded by his cousin Muhammad VI al-Habib and his oldest son, Moncef Bey became Bey in 1942.

Muhammad V an-Nasir
- Royal Family of Tunisia

== See also ==
- History of French-era Tunisia
- Couitéas affair

== Notes ==
Preceded by Muhammad IV al-Hadi	Bey of Tunis; 1906–1922	Succeeded by Muhammad VI al-Habib
