= Mejba Revolt =

1864–65 rebellion in Tunisia

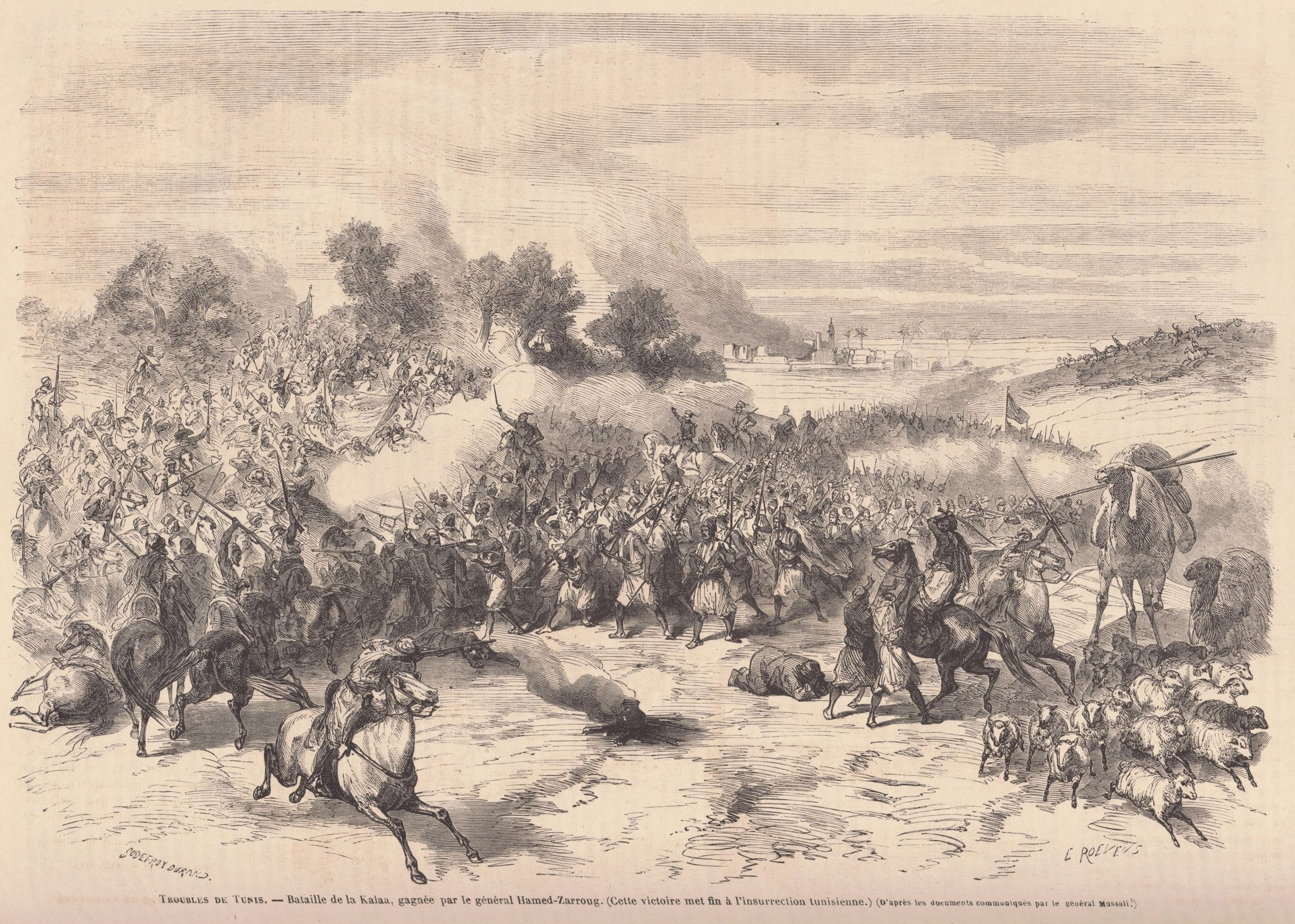
Date	1864–1865
Location	Tunisia
Result	Victory of Tunisia

Belligerents
Tunisian rebels: Rahmaniyya	Tunisia; Support: France; Britain; Ottoman Empire

Commanders and leaders
Ali Ben Ghedhahem †; Ahmed ben Hussein; Mustapha ben Azouz	Muhammad III Sadiq; Mustapha Khaznadar; Kheireddine Pacha; Farhat Gaied Jbira †; General Hussein

Strength
~10,000	5,000 Royal troops 2,000 Zwawa mercenaries loyal tribes

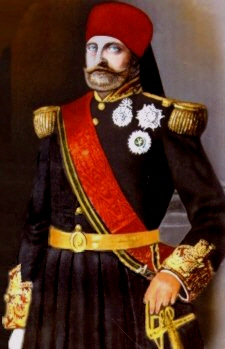
Muhammad Bey (1855-1859)

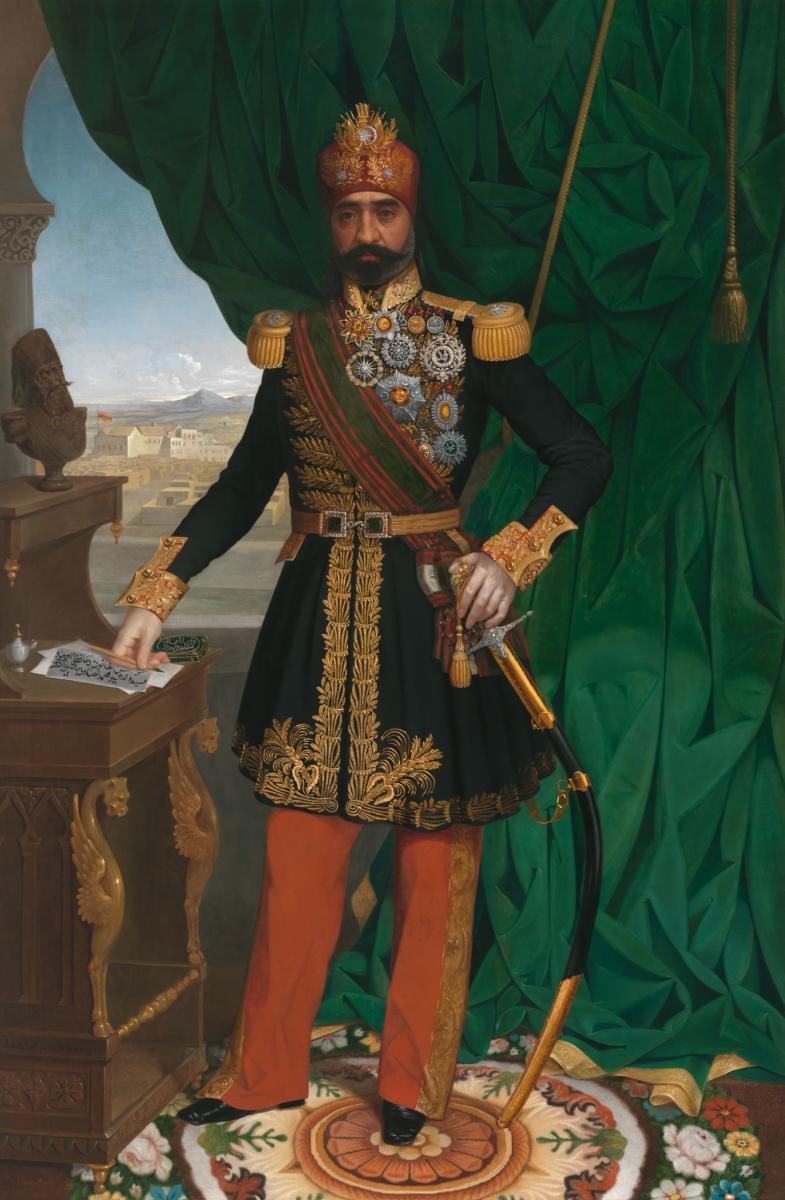
Sadok Bey (1859-1882)

The Mejba Revolt (1864–65) was a rebellion in Tunisia against the doubling of an unpopular poll tax (the mejba) imposed on his subjects by Sadok Bey. The most extensive revolt against the rule of the Husainid Beys of Tunis, it saw uprisings all over the country and came close to prompting military intervention by Britain and France. The revolt was suppressed with great brutality and the government became ever more seriously indebted to foreign creditors, backed by European governments, until it was finally unable to resist French occupation in 1881.

== Background ==
Public debt did not exist in the Regency of Tunis until the end of the reign of Mustapha Bey in 1837, but his successors found themselves in increasingly difficult financial circumstances. They wanted to modernise the country and its institutions: Ahmed Bey had set up a military academy at Le Bardo and begun training a larger army. He sent 15,000 Tunisian soldiers to fight for the Ottoman Empire in the Crimean War, and also established new government offices—the rabta managing state grain silos; the ghaba in charge of olive oil forests; and the ghorfa, the central state procurement office. His successor Muhammad Bey was an ambitious palace-builder.

To fund these expensive new ventures, the Beys of Tunis relied on tax revenues paid on a customary basis. Most of the country paid the mejba (Arabic: مجبة) established in the seventeenth century under the Muradid dynasty. There is much scholarly debate about exactly what this constituted and how it was levied, but it appears that before 1856, the term mejba signified a tax paid by a tribe, clan or other social group, based on a collective assessment. The Beys also imposed monopoly taxes on salt, tobacco, tanned hides and other commodities.

=== Muhammad Bey - the mejba and foreign influence ===
In 1856, Muhammad Bey embarked on a major fiscal reform. He gave up most of his taxes on commodities and agricultural goods (except for olive and date trees, oils and cereals) as well as the old mejba levies, and instituted a new capitation tax called the i'ana (Arabic: اعانة) which quickly also became known as the mejba, although it was a new tax calculated on a completely different basis—it was levied on individuals rather than on groups. This new mejba was fixed at 36 piastres per adult male per year. For most peasants, this equated to about 45 days' labour. To reduce potential unrest, the five largest towns—Tunis, Sfax, Sousse, Monastir, Tunisia and Kairouan—were exempted. The new tax raised 9.7m piastres out of a total 22.95m piastres of government income. Although burdensome, the new mejba was not sufficient to eliminate the government deficit. The developing economy meant that increasingly gold and silver coin tended to fall into the hands of European merchants, who took it out of the country. When the foreign merchants refused to accept copper coins, Muhammad Bey issued debased currency in 1858.

Since the beginning of the conquest of Algeria in 1830, France had maintained a close interest in the affairs of the Regency, and successive Beys had sought to avoid giving France or any other power reason to intervene further. However the Batto Sfez Affair in 1857 did give France an excuse to put more pressure on Muhammad Bey, and a naval squadron of nine ships and seven hundred cannon was sent to La Goulette to insist that he promptly adopt a series of reforms modelled on the Ottoman Tanzimat. As a result, Muhammad Bey agreed to the Fundamental Pact (Arabic: عهد الأمان) ('Ahd al-Aman or Pledge of Security). The Pact guaranteed equality of taxation (thus implicitly abolishing the discriminatory jizya tax imposed on non-Muslims). It also permitted foreigners to own land, participate in all types of businesses and set up separate commercial courts. A number of concessions were quickly granted to French firms, for example to construct telegraph lines and renovate the Zaghouan aqueduct. The Fundamental Pact thus further undermined the shaky finances of the Regency by abolishing traditional taxes, and opened the door to commercial penetration of the country by foreign business. Both issues were to become points of grievance in the Mejba Revolt.

=== Sadok Bey - Reform and rising debt ===
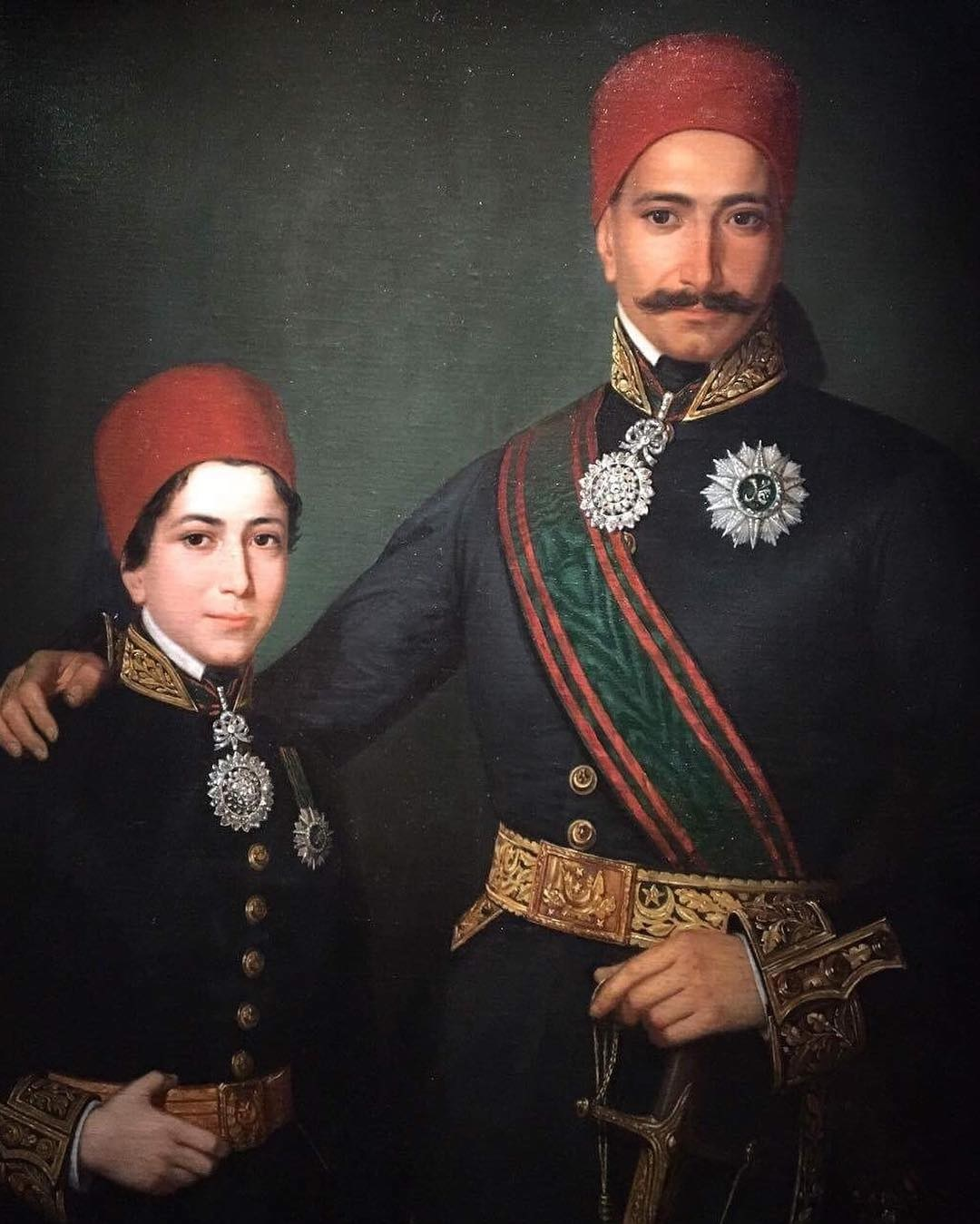
Mustapha Khaznadar and his son

Muhammad Bey was succeeded in 1859 by his brother Sadok Bey, In 1860, Sadok Bey introduced conscription for the first time in Tunisia—military service was now obligatory for a period of eight years. Recruits were selected by lot, and those who could afford it could buy themselves out of the service. Thus it was only the poor who ended up serving.

Following the introduction of the new mejba and military service, on 23 April 1861 Sadok Bey promulgated the first written constitution in the Arab world, separating executive, legislative and judiciary powers, through a new Supreme Council, legislature and court system and thereby limiting his own powers. This constitution reaffirmed the equality of rights for Muslims, Christians (effectively, therefore, for Europeans) and for Jews; in particular, concerning the right to own property. This created a new legal environment which encouraged Europeans to set up businesses in Tunisia. The new constitution was not popular. The new Supreme Council was filled with placemen of the Prime Minister Mustapha Khaznadar, mamluks, and others of Turkish and non-native descent, with few of the traditional Arab tribal leaders of the interior. The customary links between ruler and ruled were displaced, and it became harder for the sheikhs outside Tunis to gain audience. The costs of the new institutions were regarded as excessive, and resented as a sign of foreign interference.

Sadok Bey tried to resolve the country's chronic financial problems in May 1862 by borrowing 10m piastres at 12% interest from Nassim Shamama, his Jewish Receiver-General of Finances. As a result, internal public debt increased by 60% during the first three years of his reign.

The loan secured from Nassim Shamama was not sufficient to restore the Regency to financial health. Indeed, interest payments on the loan absorbed a huge proportion of state revenues. By 1862, the government debt had reached 28m piastres and civil servants were working for months unpaid. As a way out, Mustapha Khaznadar proposed that Sadok Bey take out the country's first ever foreign loan. Accordingly, on 6 May 1863, he concluded a loan with the French banker Erlanger in the amount of 35m francs. However, by the time various intermediaries—including Mustapha Khaznadar himself—had extracted their fees from the gross amount, only 5,640,914 was ultimately paid over to the Bey's Treasury. The loan was repayable over fifteen and a half years at a rate of 4,200,000 francs per year (7m piastres). This revenue could not be raised from the existing means of taxation—the new mejba was now raising only 3m piastres a year—so a new, increased tax was required.

== Outbreak of the revolt ==
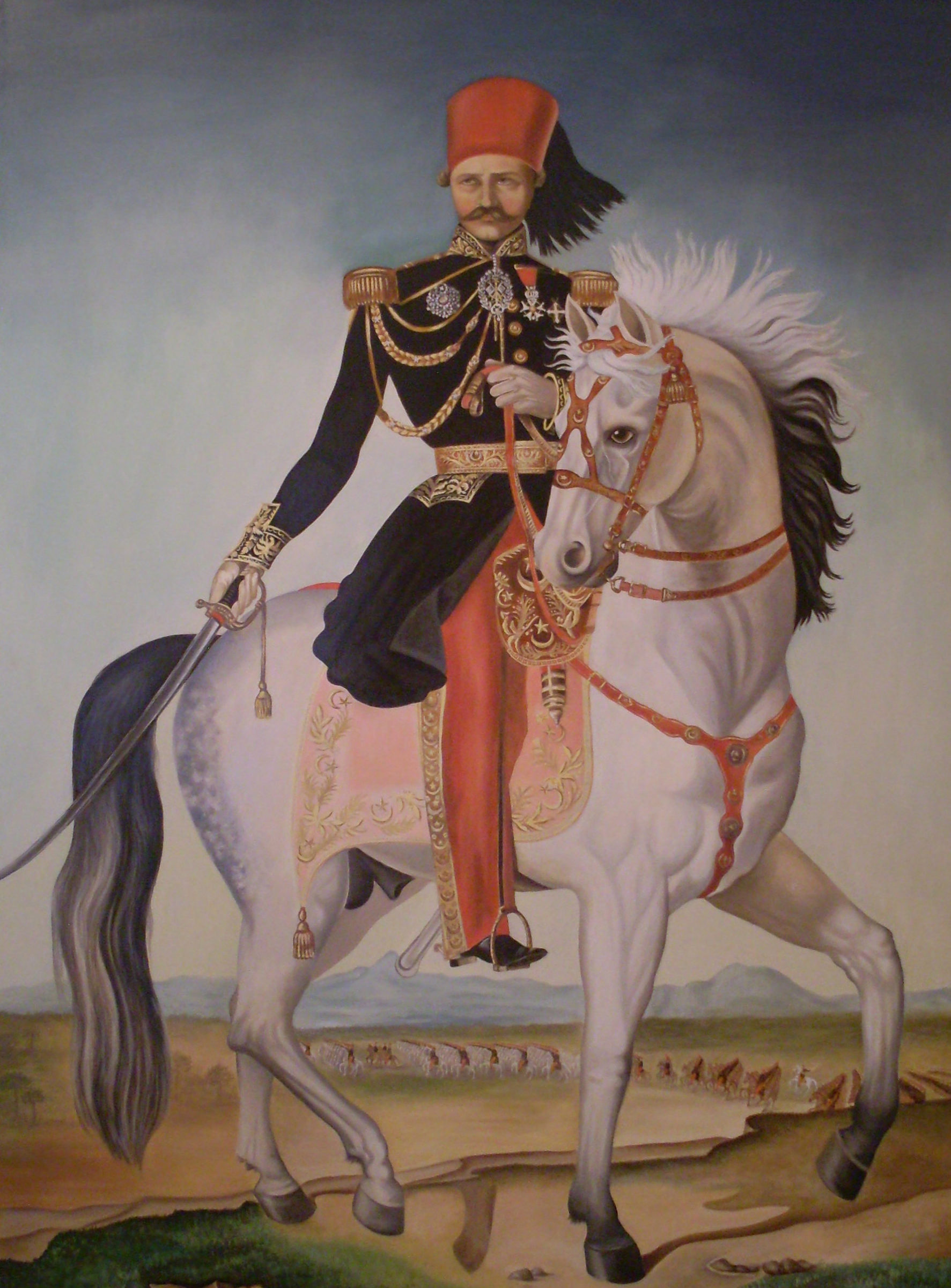
Kheireddine Pasha

In September 1863 the decision was taken to apply the new mejba (or, properly, the i'ana) to the five towns that had previously been exempted, and to double the rate to 72 piastres per head. This measure was vigorously opposed by the Bey's ex-Minister Kheireddine Pacha, General Hussein and General Farhat Gaied Jbira who served on the Supreme Council and was also the caïd (governor) of El Kef. General Hussein exclaimed: 'the conditions of the country will not allow it to bear any more taxes. The country is in danger!' Kheireddine Pasha said that most of the additional revenue generated by the increase would be taken up by the cost of the army needed to raise it. The notables convened by Sadok Bey to hear his plans made clear that they would not be able to enforce them on their people.

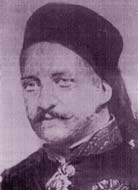
General Hussein

=== Murder of General Farhat ===
As soon as the news spread, trouble broke out in the tribal regions. Caravans were looted and stocks of weapons and powder were built up. In an attempt to calm the growing unrest, a decree of 22 March 1864 modified the new mejba again, making it into a progressive tax. Those eligible to pay were graded into six categories on the basis of their wealth, and the mejba applied to them on a scale of 36 to 108 piastres. It was however stipulated that the average rate paid by the population under each caïd was to remain at 72 piastres. To show the government's determination to push ahead with the new tax, the Bey ordered all governors to return to their posts and begin implementing it.

Obeying this order, General Farhat began the journey to his post as governor of El Kef and the Ounifa tribe on 16 April 1864. As the region around El Kef was now in revolt, he asked for an armed escort, but the Bey had no men to spare. Farhat therefore asked his deputy to come out to meet him with 150 spahis from the town. Ignoring his deputy's advice not to proceed because of the danger, he continued to make for his post as ordered. When he reached the pass at Khanguet el Gdim, 21 km from El Kef, he was surrounded by insurgents. The spahis, who came from the same tribe as them, did not want to fight them, and melted away, leaving him only with eight of his attendants. All were slaughtered. The olive tree, pockmarked with bullets, where he met his end was venerated for many years until it was cut down and burned in around 1950.

=== Revolt of Ali Ben Ghedhahem ===
The death of General Farhat galvanised the rebels. El Kef was besieged by surrounding tribes, while the authorities refused to let them enter the town. The Governor of Kairouan, General Rashid, took refuge in a house which was then surrounded; the defenders opened fire and killed some of the attackers. After a tense negotiation, the General was allowed to leave for Sousse, but the countryside was so hostile that from there, he was obliged to make for Tunis on a British ship. A provisional government was set up by the rebels in Kairouan after he departed. Similar incidents unfolded across much of north an interior of the country. At Béja, Téboursouk, Makthar and Jendouba, the governors were forced to flee for their lives and their property was looted. The governor of the Majer tribe in the Thala region was not so fortunate. Besieged in his fortress, he killed dozens of attackers before it fell. He was killed, along with his entire family, and his body decapitated on 21 May.

The dead governor's secretary, Ali Ben Ghedhahem (Arabic: علي بن غذاهم), born in 1814 in Sbeïtla, quickly established himself as the leader of the revolt in the west of the country. When the Bey's soldiers came to his region to collect the mejba, he told people to disobey, and was obliged to flee for safety to the mountains near Oueslatia and Bargou. From here, he began to organise resistance, and soon other tribes began to rally to him. The unorganised revolt of the Mthélith, the Zlass, the Majer and the Fraichiche who camped near the Algerian frontier coalesced into a definite movement as tribal notables came together to swear solemn oaths and began to unite around specific demands—a return to traditional justice and taxation. Ben Ghedhahem's main lieutenants were the Zlassi Seboui Ben Mohamed Seboui and the Riahi Fraj Ben Dahr. Ali Ben Ghedhahem had connections in the Tijaniyyah order of Sufis who spread the message of insurrection. From April 1864 onwards, Ali Ben Ghedhahem was referred to as 'the people's Bey' (bey al-umma). He decided to lead his forces on Tunis, but only reached as far as El Fahs, where they had a series of inconclusive encounters with forces loyal to the Bey.

In April and May 1864 the Bey did not have the military means to strike a decisive blow against Ben Ghedhahem. While seeking to calm the unrest by revoking the constitution of 1861 and announcing that the mejba would not after all be doubled, he therefore prepared his forces and opened clandestine negotiations with Ben Ghedhahem through the Maliki Grand Mufti Ahmed Ben Hussein and the head of the Rahmaniyya Sufi order, Mustapha Ben Azouz.

=== Uprising in the Sahel ===
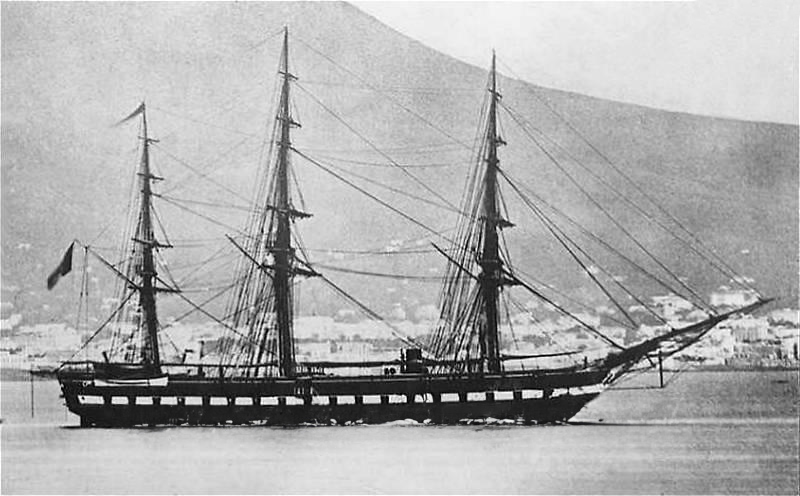
the frigate Giuseppe Garibaldi

Despite these negotiations however, the rebellion spread to the coastal towns of the Sahel region as well. In the Gabes region, the governor escaped death by handing over to the rebels all the tax money he had already collected. The Bey then sent a boat to rescue him. On 30 April in Sfax, the rebels took control of the town, ransacked the tax offices, seized the casbah and freed the prisoners confined there. On 23 May the local authorities sought to regain control of the town by arresting the rebel leaders, but the entire town rose up to demand their release, with shouts of 'Down with the mamluks!' and 'Long live the [Ottoman] Sultan!' As the caïd and the other notables fled, they hoisted the Tunisian flag and set up a provisional government. The Bey's envoy, General Osman, arrived three days later, and was only spared lynching thanks to the intervention of local religious leaders. On 31 May, Sousse revolted, encouraged by the example of Sfax. All tax collection stopped, and the rebels took control of the town. Demanding the keys of the town and the kasba from the governor they accused him of 'delivering the country to the Christians' and set about fortifying the seaward side of the town in expectation of bombardment by European warships. European expatriates took refuge on board the Italian frigate Giuseppe Garibaldi. Throughout the country, the tribes rose up and threatened anyone who refused to join them, plundering the property of government officials.

== European and Ottoman intervention ==
The French government instructed its consul Charles de Beauval not to involve himself in the internal politics of the Regency, but despite this, he did not hesitate to advise Sadok Bey to revoke his reforms, suspend the constitution, and send Khaznadar away. The British government had likewise given its consul Richard Wood instructions to keep out of the dispute, but he nevertheless offered the Bey the opposite advice— to support Khaznadar and maintain the new constitution, while cancelling the doubling of the mejba. With the official justification of concern for their expatriates, Britain France and Italy all sent naval forces to cruise the Tunisian coasts. In fact each wanted to be sure that neither of the others would take advantage of the rebellion to secure hegemony over the Regency.

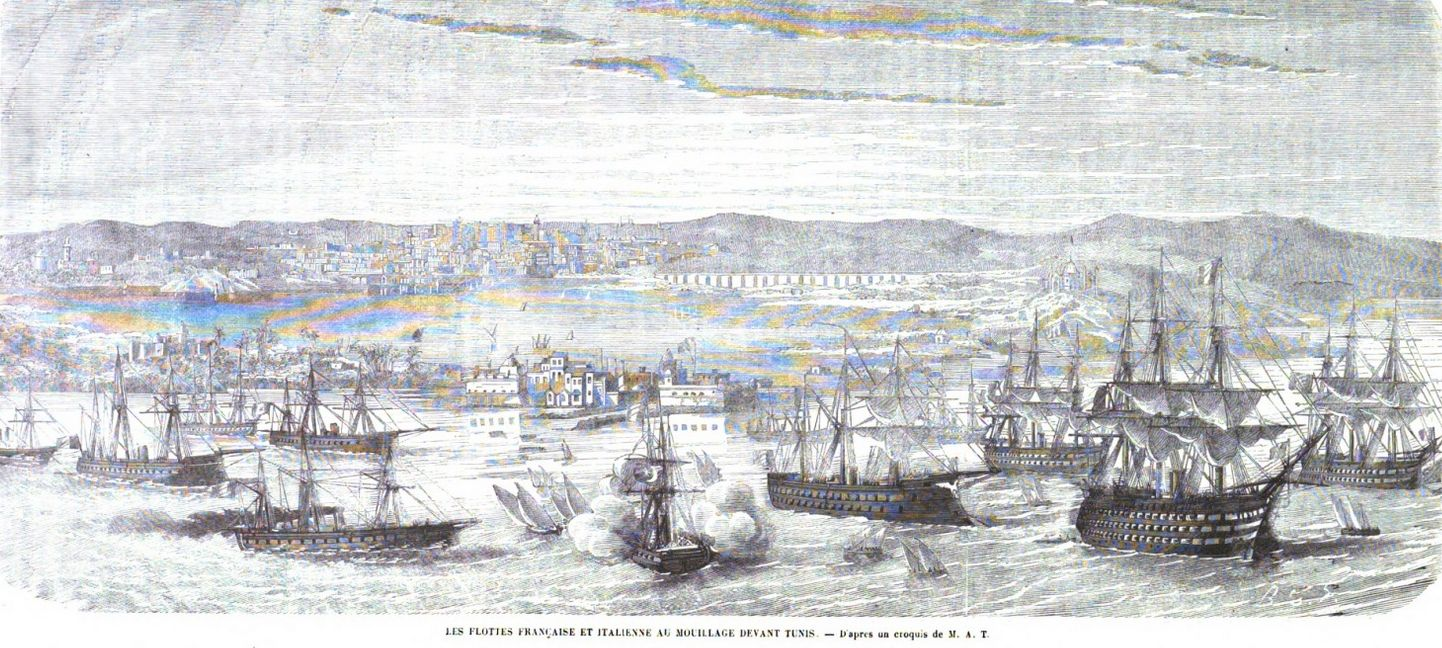
French and Italian fleets in the roadstead off Tunis, 1864.

On 11 May, Haydar Effendi, the former Ottoman Minister Plenipotentiary in Tehran, arrived at La Goulette with an Ottoman naval squadron to reinforce the rights of the Sublime Porte. He was welcomed enthusiastically by the people of Tunis who feared that European soldiers were about to land in the country. His real purpose was to take advantage of the situation to bring Tunis back under closer Ottoman rule. He proposed that Sadok Bey sign an agreement undertaking not to enter into any treaty with another power without the Sultan's consent, pay 3m piastres a year in tribute, and present himself in Istanbul to receive an Imperial investiture. Even the British consul, who favoured maximum Ottoman influence in Tunisia to frustrate the French, would not support these demands, and the agreement was never signed.

This did not prevent the British consul from making contact with the rebels to warn them about French intentions and remind them of the friendly ties between Britain and the Ottoman Empire, which counted for much with a population hoping for an Ottoman intervention to persuade the Bey to reduce his demands. At the same time, despite his instruction, De Beaval sought to use the crisis to strengthen France's role in the country. He made contact with Ben Gedhahem and assured him that the aim of the French warships was to support his demands and that he was seeking to secure the dismissal of the Prime Minister. Led by De Beauval, the French Foreign Minister Édouard Drouyn de Lhuys backed his approach and even considered replacing Sadok Bey himself if circumstances allowed. On 29 a June a column of 3,000 soldiers in Algeria was moved up to the Tunisian border in readiness for any eventuality. However the rebel leader ignored these overtures and forwarded the French letters to Khaznadar, who passed them on to the British. The resulting scandal was such that De Beauval was forced to leave the country in January 1865.

Meanwhile, the Italian government planned to land an expeditionary force of 10,000 in Tunis in June 1864 to take control of the capital and the main coastal towns. However the Italian press broke the story of preparations in the port of Genoa and in the face of British anger, the plan was abandoned.

Ultimately, none of the European powers wanted to risk starting a major international incident by taking too bold a stance in Tunisia. Accordingly, on 23 September 1864, they agreed to withdraw their navies and allowed the Bey to put down the rebellion without further interference. Haydar Effendi also departed on the same day.

Meanwhile, the Receiver-General Nassim Shamama, who had both lent money to Sadok Bey in 1862 and helped Khaznadar arrange the Erlanger loan in 1863 left for Paris on 8 June 1864 on an official mission to negotiate a new loan. Instead however he took with him many compromising government papers and 20m piastres and never returned to Tunis. After his death in 1873 in Livorno the Tunisian government pursued his heirs through the courts to recuperate some of the money he had stolen.

== Waning of the revolt ==
The Ottoman envoy's mission had been a godsend for the Bey. Not only did he make a show of force to deter the European powers, he also brought desperately-needed financial support in the amount of 0.5m francs in gold coin. At the same time the government was able to raise further funds by selling the coming olive harvest to European traders in advance, with Khaznadar once again profiting from the transaction. This allowed the Bey to re-recruit 2,000 zouaoua troops who had been dismissed from service by his predecessor Muhammad Bey for grave indiscipline. As they were Kabyles from Algeria, their loyalty could be relied on as they had no ties to the Arab tribal leaders of the rebellion. The Bey was also able to use some of this money to begin buying off some of the tribal leaders, and mistrust started to spread among the rebels. The fear grew that if the uprising continued, the country would end up being occupied by the French army. The rebellion began to falter. In the countryside, people wanted to return to their fields in time for the harvest; in the coastal towns, fear of brigandage by the nomadic tribes led by Ali Ben Ghedhahem made them wary of throwing their lot in with the insurgents of the interior.

On 29 June 1864 a military column headed by General Ismail Es-Sunni Saheb at-Taba'a marched out from Tunis to meet Ben Ghedhahem and offer him an amnesty (aman). As the price of his surrender, Ben Ghedhahem asked for the estate of Henchir Rohia for himself, the caïdship of the Majer for his brother and various other positions for his friends. The rebels' other demands were:

- Total amnesty for all past acts
- Implementation of sharia law
- Closing of the new courts and restitution of traditional justice
- Removal of all special protections for all foreigners throughout the Regency
- Capping the mejba at 10 piastres per adult man
- Capping the 'achour' (tithe on cereal crops) at 10 piastres per méchia (12-18 hectares)
- Abolition of the 'maks' (transaction tax) outside the souks
- Restoration of the slave trade
- Removal of the Turkish and mamluk caïds and requirement for them to submit their accounts to scrutiny
- Restoration of the tax on palm trees and olive trees at the old rates established by Ahmad Bey
- Waiver of all other demands on the Bey's subjects
- Restoration of the traditional management of habous land

On 19 July Sadok Bey agreed to give Ben Ghedhahem an amnesty, making sure that his requests for personal rewards were widely publicised to undermine him among his followers. On 28 July, the Bey also announced his acceptance of most of Ghedhahem's terms. The mejba was to be reduced to 20 piastres, the achour halved, the maks abolished and the Turkish and mamluk caïds replaced with Tunisian Arabs.

It did not take Ben Ghedhahem long to realise he had been duped. The rewards he sought were never granted. The old caïds remained in place. The mejba continued to be levied at the exorbitant rate of 72 piastres and all of the other taxes remained in force. On 9 August a military column headed by General Rustum headed for El Kef with the intention of punishing the murderers of General Farhat, despite the fact the Bey had announced a total amnesty. Ben Ghedhahem found that he could not rally the tribes to resist, as the Bey's money had bought some of them off. The tribes started to quarrel - Ben Ghedhahem's own tribe was attacked by the Hamma tribe - and turned to unrestrained looting rather than concerted resistance.

== Repression ==
=== Reprisals in the Sahel ===
Negotiations between Ben Ghedhahem and the Bey did nothing to discourage the rebels of the coastal towns. The arrival of General Osman in Sousse to recruit soldiers raised tensions once again. From 23 July, the town was besieged by the inhabitants of nearby towns who wanted him gone and the new taxes abolished. The people of Monastir refused to send help to Osman and even, on 11 September, refused to allow General Slim to land in the town, after he had been sent by the Bey to rally them.

On 29 August, a mhalla (military column) headed by General Ahmad Zarrouk set out from Tunis for the Sahel region. It advanced slowly - time was on the Bey's side as harvest approached and the tribes were becoming ever more disunited. On 5 October, to cut the column off from resupply, the rebels decided to take the town of Kalâa Kebira near Sousse, which resisted their advance. Zarrrouk marched to the relief of the town and inflicted a crushing defeat on the rebels two days later. Rebel elements fled to the neighbouring village of Kalâa Seghira where they were caught by the soldiers who massacred them and plundered the village. News of this outrage terrified the neighbouring area, where towns and villages now offered their submission without further resistance.

The conditions imposed by Zarrouk were pitiless. The leaders of the revolt were hanged or shot. Notables were imprisoned and tortured to make them reveal the names of ringleaders. Even women and old men were tortured. Hundreds of sheikhs suspected of disloyalty were chained together by the ankle. Soldiers who had abandoned their posts were interned and sent back to Tunis, where they were treated as prisoners of war. Religious leaders were dismissed. The zouaoua and those tribes which had remained loyal, or returned to loyalty early enough, laid waste to the countryside and subjected it to a reign of terror. To consolidate his authority, Zarrouk was made caïd of Sousse and Monastir.

The Bey was now determined to make the rebel areas pay for the cost of the war. On top of his already unmanageable debts, he owed European traders for additional loans incurred to pay for the arming of his soldiers. The Sahel towns of Sousse, Mahdia and Monastir had previously been assessed for 3.5m piastres in tax payments - now the Bey demanded 25m from them. To pay for these exactions, the people had to sell their property or pawn it to middlemen, associates of Zarrouk, who charged interest at 40% per year. The oil harvest for 1865 was sold in advance to these middlemen. Wealthy townspeople were tortured until they revealed their hidden riches. They were made to pay to avoid the rape of their wives or to avoid shame of having the rape publicly announced.

In 1973, the then President of Tunisia Habib Bourguiba (born in Monastir in 1903) spoke of the impact on his family of the repression after the Mejba Revolt.

'To compel the people to give up their goods, (General) Zarrouk put many notables in irons and locked them up; one of them was my grandfather. Their ordeal lasted I don't know how many days. Then my family took a sheet and wrapped up all their jewels and all their land titles. My father had the task of taking all this to Zarrouk to obtain my grandfather's freedom. He made his way to the encampment where a number of tents stood. Above one of them flew a flag. This was the tent of General Zarrouk, who took all our fortune and freed his prisoners. Ten days later, my grandfather died from the appalling treatment he had suffered. My father did not escape unscathed either. He was conscripted into Zarrouk's army where he served for nineteen years, the longest and hardest years of his life. He urged me to study. 'I don't want you to be brought down to the level of a beast of burden one day' he said. 'I don't want to see you like me, condemned to wear a uniform all your days.' I assured him I would do my best by devoting myself completely to my studies.

On 9 April the mhalla reached Sfax, which was subjected to similar exactions as a fine of 5.5m piastres was imposed; Djerba was fined a further 5m piastres. Fields were plundered and herds driven off. Only the nomads escaped the punitive action by fleeing into Tripolitania. When Zarrouk's column returned to Tunis on 30 July 1865, the centre and south of the country had been brutalised and plundered on an enormous scale for nearly a year.

=== Harrying the north ===
In the North, the troops of ’Ali Ben Ghedhahem tried to oppose the advance of a General Rustum's column as it approached El Kef. Some of his close allies were however betrayed and handed over to the Bey's forces. His lieutenant was given a thousand strokes with a stick in front of the women of the harem in the Bardo palace, and thrown barely alive into a dungeon. Soon a second mhalla under Ali Bey joined up with Rustum's forces. To avoid annihilation, Ben Ghedhahem and 5,000 of his men slipped away over the Algerian border to take refuge with the Nemencha people in January 1865. With him out of the way, the northwest was subjected to the same exactions as the Sahel and fines were imposed, though as more of the population were nomadic they could more easily evade the army by moving around. Crops and herds were seized as elsewhere, but as prices collapsed there was little value in them. The army therefore resorted to gruesome extorsions from even those settled areas which had remained loyal.

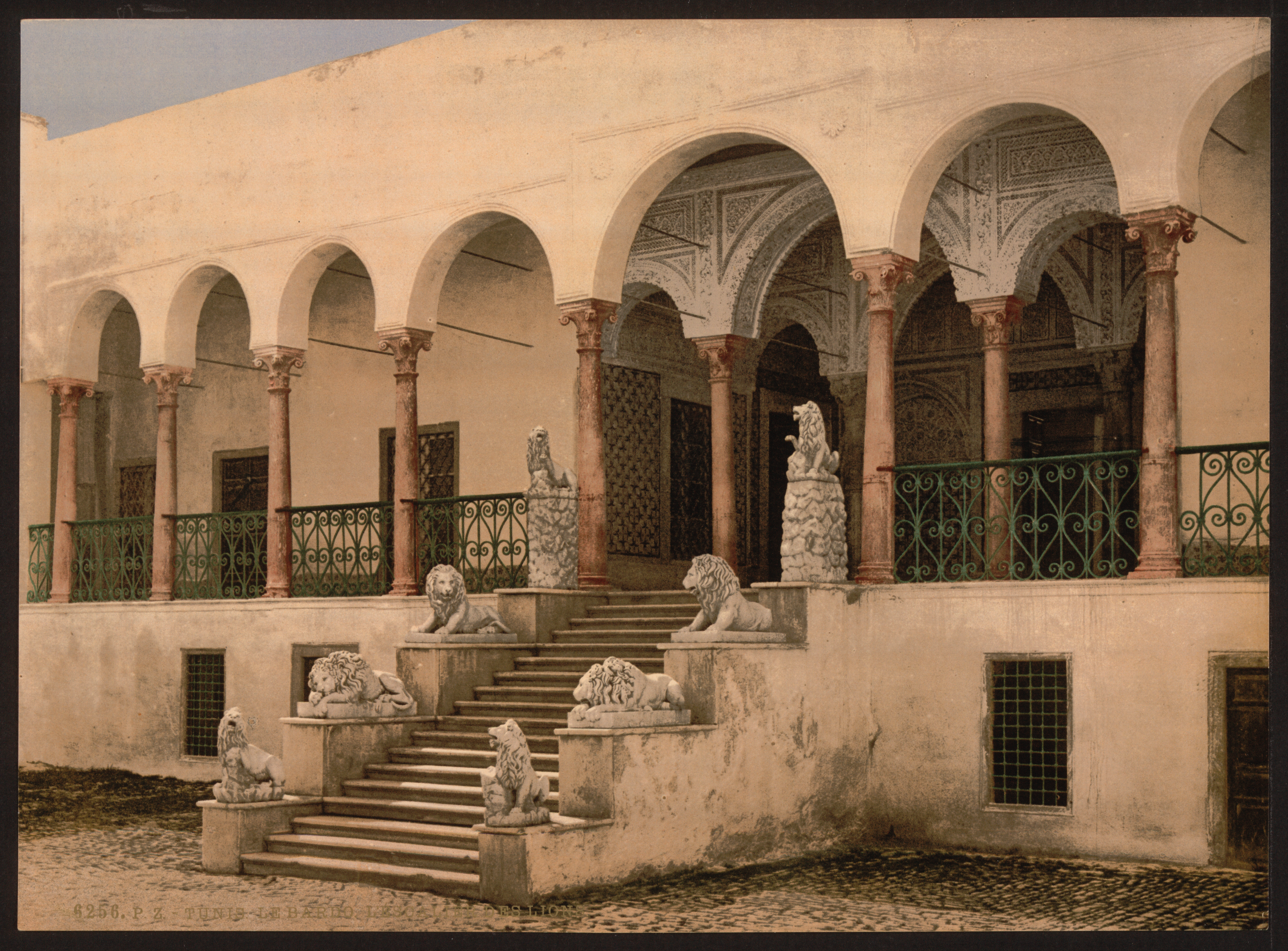
Steps in front of the Bardo palace where the prisoners were bastonaded

Two hundred prisoners were sent, loaded with chains, to the Bardo palace, despite having bring promised amnesty. Condemned to the bastinado, they were beaten under the balconies of the Bey, in front of the steps leading up to the Hall of Justice, so that all could see their punishment and hear their pleas for mercy. For ten days the tribal sheikhs, their wrists and ankles bound and their faces to the ground, were savagely beaten, receiving up to 2,000 blows. Sixteen of them died quickly, and most of the rest did not long survive the dungeons.

Ali Bey returned to the Bardo on 27 April 1865 with more notables as prisoners, from whom he intended to extort further wealth. On 5 September he set off again for Béja, which he planned to hold to ransom. Anyone suspected of owning any wealth was thrown in prison until their family bought their freedom. Here too, the region was utterly ruined and only those who managed to escape into the mountains held on to any possessions.

=== The end of Ali Ben Ghedhahem ===
In January 1865 Ali Ben Ghedhahem and his brother Abd En Nebi were taken under watch to Constantine while his men were disarmed and interned by the French. The French treated them well, as they saw him as a potential ally in the event of a future conquest of the country. On 5 February Sadok Bey granted a fresh amnesty to the rebels who had fled, but not to the Ben Ghedhahem brothers. At the same time, the Bey made secret contact with them, claiming that the French were making preparations to betray them and deliver them both to him at the Bardo. Finally, missing his homeland, Ali Ben Ghedhahem took flight on 17 November 1865 and returned to Tunisia, hiding out in the Regba massif near the border at Ghardimaou. The Bey's armies under General Slim laid siege to him but the mountain people refused to give him up. Some tribal leaders tried to persuade him to resume armed resistance in order to end the reprisals and extortions the army was inflicting on their region, but he refused. All he wanted was a pardon from the Bey so he could return to normal life. Eventually, he was persuaded to place himself under the protection of an Algerian marabout of the Tijaniyya order, Mohammed el Aïd, who was on his way to Mecca by way of Tunis. On 25 February 1866, Ben Ghedhahem joined his caravan at El Ksour. The caïd of El Kef wanted to arrest him, but his soldiers refused to do so. On 28 February, having reached Téboursouk, he was captured by cavalry sent out by the Bey. His brother managed to escape.

He was brought to the Bardo palace on 2 March where he was subjected to insults and the blows of his captors. His only hope was the protection of the holy man with whom he had been travelling, but Mohammed el Aïd continued on his way to Mecca on a steamship specially provided by the Bey. He remained in prison until his death on 11 October 1867.

== Aftermath ==
=== Ruin of the countryside ===
Much of the countryside was laid waste. The harvests had all been seized and sold, reducing the people to famine for three years. People ate herbs and roots, and there were even reports of desperate people eating children in some areas. In the wake of the hunger came cholera, in 1865, 1866 and 1867, and there was a typhus outbreak in 1867.

'Dead bodies lay in the roads, unburied. They were collected every morning in the caravanserais and the mosques, and heaped in carts. Bubonic plague and typhus combined; this new scourge caused such ravages that there were two hundred new victims each day in the town of Sousse alone. Already, when there was only famine to contend with, Europeans did not dare leave their houses, for fear of encountering people wandering in the street, emaciated, whom despair might push to commit some awful crime. In the countryside, caravans were stopped and pillaged. The admirable soil of the Sahel itself was not spared: owners cut down their olive trees, their future fortune, to sell as firewood, rather than pay the endless taxes which were laid upon them. In the Djerid, many date-palm owners did likewise. Whoever tried to work and produce simply ended up paying taxes for those who now owned nothing.'

'The famine of 1867 all but emptied Thala, Kalaat Senan, Zouarine and Ebba and reduced the population of towns like El Kef and Téboursouk significantly. Zouarine, said by Victor Guérin to have 250-300 souls, was abandoned after the attacks of Fraichiche bedouin driven by hunger, and not repopulated until the eve of the Protectorate on the initiative of the governor of El Kef, Si Rachid. At Ebba, want compelled most owners to sell their houses and gardens to their sheikh, Kader, who let them fall down or become overgrown with weeds.'

=== Debt crisis ===
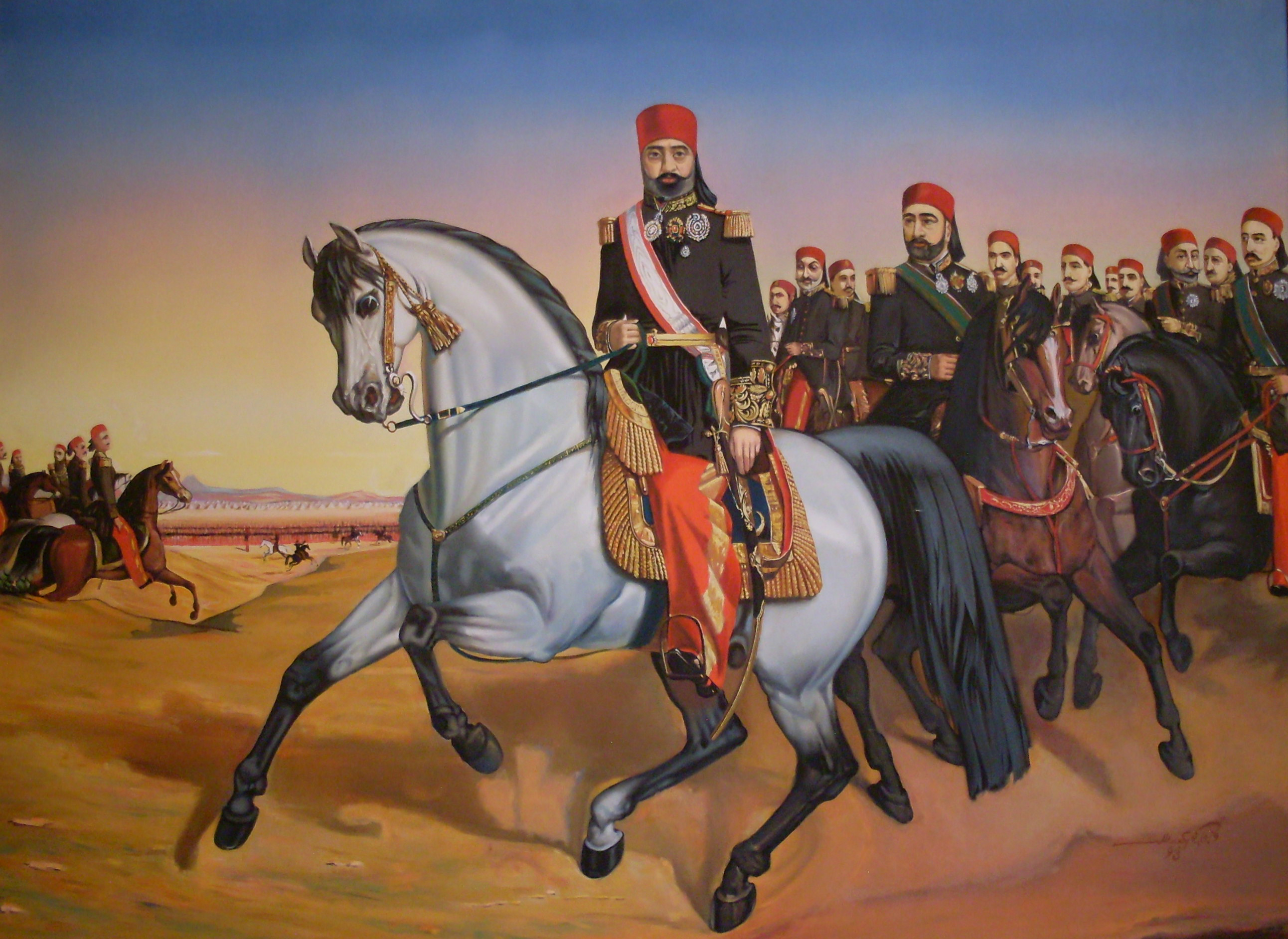
Sadok Bey, with Khaznadar just behind him

The extorsions of Zarrouk and the other commanders did much to enrich them, but nothing to improve the government's finances. With no other recourse, Sadok Bey was persuaded by Khaznadar to take out yet another foreign loan, on which Khaznadar once again made substantial commissions. As Nassim Shamama had fled in June 1864, the following month a loan of 5m francs was arranged with a Jewish financier named Morpurgo from Alexandria, of which only 0.5m found their way to the treasury. A new contract was signed with the Erlanger Bank on 1 November 1864 for 15m francs guaranteed by customs revenues. A further 10m francs was subscribed several weeks later by the Oppenheim Bank, guaranteed by the tax on olive trees. As loan after loan was subscribed on terms very favourable to lenders, the Paris market was euphoric, and loans to Tunisia as well as to Egypt and the Ottoman Empire were known as "turban securities." The newspapers carried upbeat accounts of the commercial opportunities. As the Tunisian economy collapsed, La Semaine financière wrote of the 1865 loan: "Today, the Bey of Tunis is under the moral protection of France, which takes an interest in the Tunisian people’s prosperity, since this prosperity also implies Algeria’s safety".

The collapse of agricultural production made the repayment of these loans impossible. They could only be paid with funds secured from a further loan of 5m francs in June 1865. In January 1866, the European banks were approached again for 115m francs, which could not be raised. To avoid a default, a new loan of 100m francs was launched on 9 February 1867, to pay off the commitments from 1863 and 1865, guaranteed against the receipts of those taxes which could still be levied. By 1868, the state was effectively bankrupt; foreign creditors were no longer being paid, and they called on their governments to intervene. A beylical decree of 5 July 1869 established the International Debt Commission and gave it control over the entire taxation system of the country.

=== Rebellion of 1867 ===
Unrest broke out again in 1867 in the northwestern border region of Kroumirie. The kroumirs lived an independent existence in their forests, and the government in Tunis did not have the means or the will to bring them firmly under its rule. The rebellion might therefore have remained a local affair, but on 11 September 1867, the government learned to its astonishment that Sadok Bey's youngest half-brother, Sidi Adel, had escaped from the palace in the night, travelled west, and placed himself at the head of the rebels, proclaiming himself Bey. He was accompanied by a number of high-ranking officials, who were deeply dissatisfied with the continued influence of Mustapha Khaznadar and the damaging effect it was having on the country. Sadok Bey confined himself in the Bardo palace, but sent the Bey al-Mahalla, Ali Bey, to Kroumirie with an armed force. Sidi Adel fell ill and the Kroumirs surrendered him to his nephew in exchange for an amnesty, which, as ever, the Bey did not honour. Ben Dhiaf recorded that the reason the Kroumirs were so easily persuaded to submit was that after the repression and destruction of 1865, they were literally starving.

Sidi Adel was taken back to the Bardo where he died on 8 October 1867. A few days previously, on 4 October, Sadok Bey took steps to eliminate anyone on whose loyalty he could not safely rely on. Among those ordered to be strangled were Si Rachid, who had commanded the Tunisian forces in the Crimean War, and Ismail Es-Sunni Ismaïl Sahib Et-Tabaâ, his brother in law, who had negotiated with Ali Ben Ghedhahem in 1864. Their fortunes were confiscated. It was at this point, after two years of confinement, that Ali Ben Ghedhahem was killed, for fear that he might escape. Many others were also eliminated at this time to remove all possible threat to the Bey. Mustapha Khaznadar remained Prime Minister until 1873, and Sadok Bey ruled until 1882.

== See also ==
- History of Tunisia
- Ottoman Tunisia
- Turks in Tunisia
- French conquest of Tunisia
- Kheireddine Pacha
