= Giuseppe Raffo =

Tunisian businessman and politician

Giuseppe Raffo (full name Giuseppe Maria Raffo, born 9 February 1795 in Tunis. Died 2 October 1862 in Paris) was a Tunisian businessman and politician who served on the Supreme Council of the Beylik of Tunis, fulfilling the main functions of a Minister of Foreign Affairs.

== Background ==
His father, Giovanni Battista Felice Raffo, born in 1747 near Chiavari in Liguria, was captured and enslaved in 1770 by Barbary pirates. Once freed, he set up a wet house-making business and also served as interpreter to successive beys of Tunis: Ali Bey, Hammouda Pasha and Mahmoud Bay. He married Giovanna Terrazzani, (1760-1823) and left a daughter, Elena Grazia (born 1784) as well as Giuseppe Maria.

Giuseppe was introduced to court by his father and Elena converted to Islam, taking the name Aisha, and married the bey’s brother Moustapha. In 1835 Hussein Bey died and Moustapha succeeded him, making Giuseppe Raffo the bey’s brother in law. Under Hussein Bey Raffo had been a simple kasâk bashi (cloakroom attendant); Moustapha he was given the title of chief interpreter and made a member of the Council of State. Ahmad I, Raffo’s nephew, made him one of his closest advisers, and he exercised in practice the functions of Minister of Foreign Affairs.

== Political career ==
Raffo inspired Ahmed bey’s reformist policies and the gradual rapprochement of the Regency with European powers. In 1846 he led a diplomatic mission to the United Kingdom alongside the British consul in Tunis, Richard Wood, a Syrian Jew named Rhattab who converted to Catholicism. The same year, he organized a state visit, the first of a sovereign Tunisian abroad: Ahmed I first went to Paris where he obtained a resounding diplomatic success that began the process of weakening Ottoman tutelage over Tunisia.

While in the service of Ahmed bey Raffo remained a devout Catholic, promoted inter-religious dialogue and obtained an important recognition of the rights of the bey’s Christian and Jewish subjects. He promoted the abolition of slavery and encouraged relations with the Kingdom of Sardinia, obtaining the Sardinian titles of baron (1849) and then count (1851).

His dedication to the cause of the political and social renewal of Tunisia helped also earn him the sympathy of France, which granted him the Legion d’Honneur, and of the Catholic Church, which made him a member of the Order of St. Gregory the Great. Raffo was also in contact with supporters of the Italian Risorgimento: he counted among his collaborators the Genoese mazzinian it:Gaetano Fedriani and he also supported Giuseppe Garibaldi who, at one time, was employed by the Tunisian navy.

On the death of Ahmed bey, reform attempts were led by his successor and cousin, Mohamed bey with whom Raffo also had a close family relation. The sister of his wife, the Sardinian Francesca Benedetta Sanna, converted to Islam and became the new bey’s sixth. During his reign, Raffo contributed to the adoption of the Fundamental Pact of 1857 but, on the death of the sovereign in 1859, he was driven from power by the rising star of Tunisian politics, the former slave of Greek origin, Mustapha Khaznadar, appointed Grand Vizier by Sadok Bey.

He then retired from public life and died in Paris in 1862. The transfer of his remains to the Catholic cemetery of Tunis, in 1863, was attended by the highest authorities of the State, the diplomatic corps, the Catholic community and representatives of all the other religions of the country.

== Business activities ==
Raffo takes advantage of his political activities to foster links with European businessmen and financiers (particularly French and Genoese) who promoted foreign economic and commercial penetration of Tunisia and who often became his business partners. His interests were mainly linked to tuna fishing (in particular in Sidi Daoud where his father had already obtained a concession), mining and maritime transport. He was also linked in particular to Raffaele Rubattino's shipping company, amassing a considerable fortune through all of his activities.

His economic activities were continued with less success by his children and grandchildren, owners of large fortunes partly invested in an attempt to save the country's finances from disaster before the establishment of the French protectorate in 1881. After that, the Raffo retained interests in Tunisia, particularly in fisheries, the management of the assets remaining in the family until the beginning of the 20th century, before being transferred to other businesses of Ligurian origin.

== Philanthropy ==
Raffo devoted much of his wealth to the Catholic community of Tunis, which in the days before mass immigration from Sicily consisted mainly of Ligurians from Tabarka and Maltese. He built and renovated several places of worship, supported the charitable work of the Capuchin fathers, particularly appreciated by Ahmed bey, and helped philanthropic initiatives in Europe, in particular in his region of origin, Liguria. For example, he financed the reconstruction of the cathedral of Chiavari.
