= Ahmad I (disambiguation) =

Ahmed I or Ahmad I may refer to:

- Ahmed I Bakhti (1590–1617), Turkish sultan
- Ahmad I (Kalat), Wāli of Kalat, ruled 1666–1667
- Ahmad al-Mansur (1549–1603), sultan of Morocco, ruled 1578–1603
- Ahmad I ibn Mustafa (1806–1855), Bey of Tunis
- Ahmad Al-Jaber Al-Sabah (1885–1950), sheikh of Kuwait
- Ahmad ibn 'Ali Al Thani (1917–1977), emir of Qatar

== See also ==
- Ahmad
- Amad (disambiguation)
- Ahmad (disambiguation)
