= Mohamedia Palace =

Former Palace in Mohamedia, Tunisia

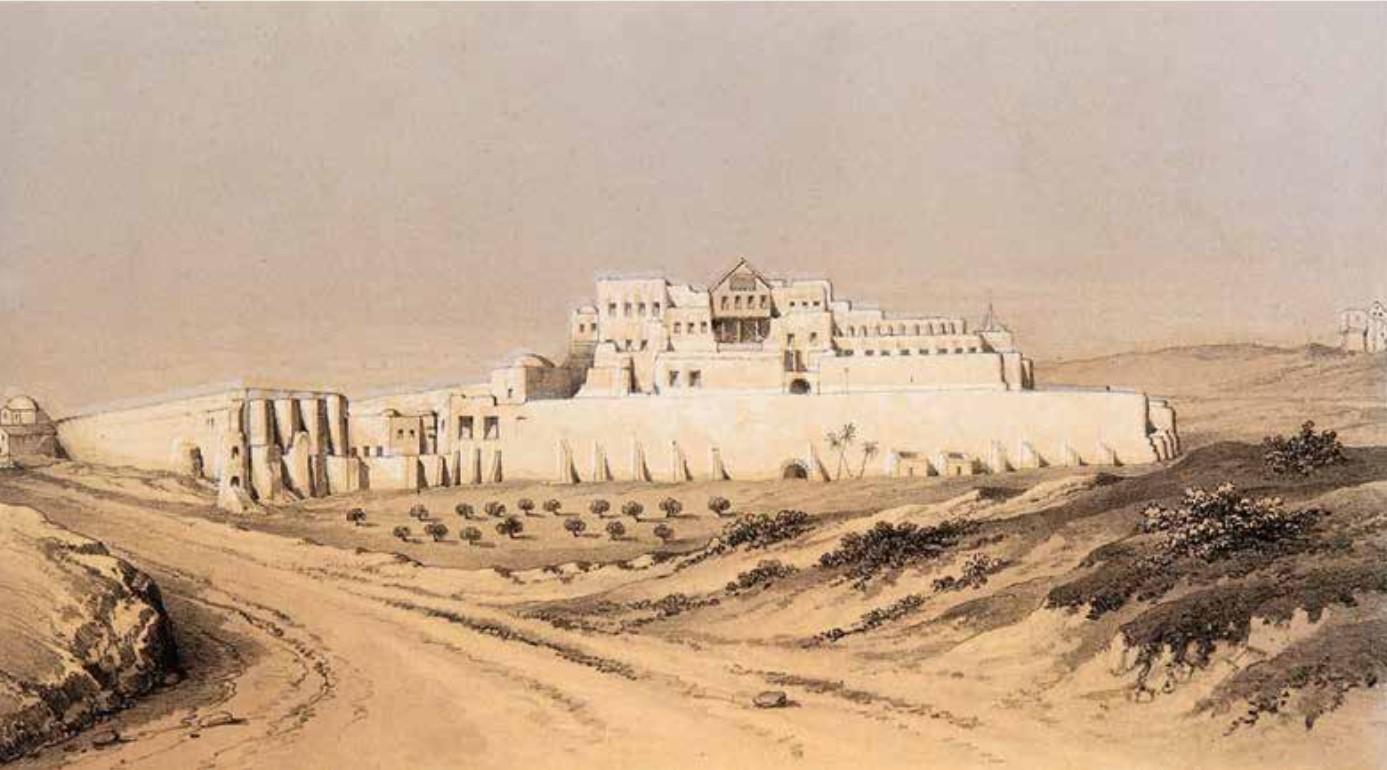
Mohamedia Palace by Chassiron in 1849

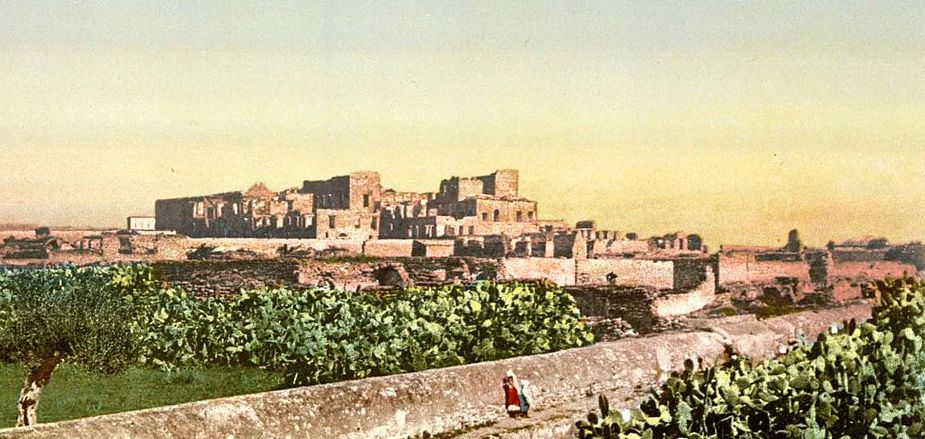
The ruins of Mohamedia Palace in 1878

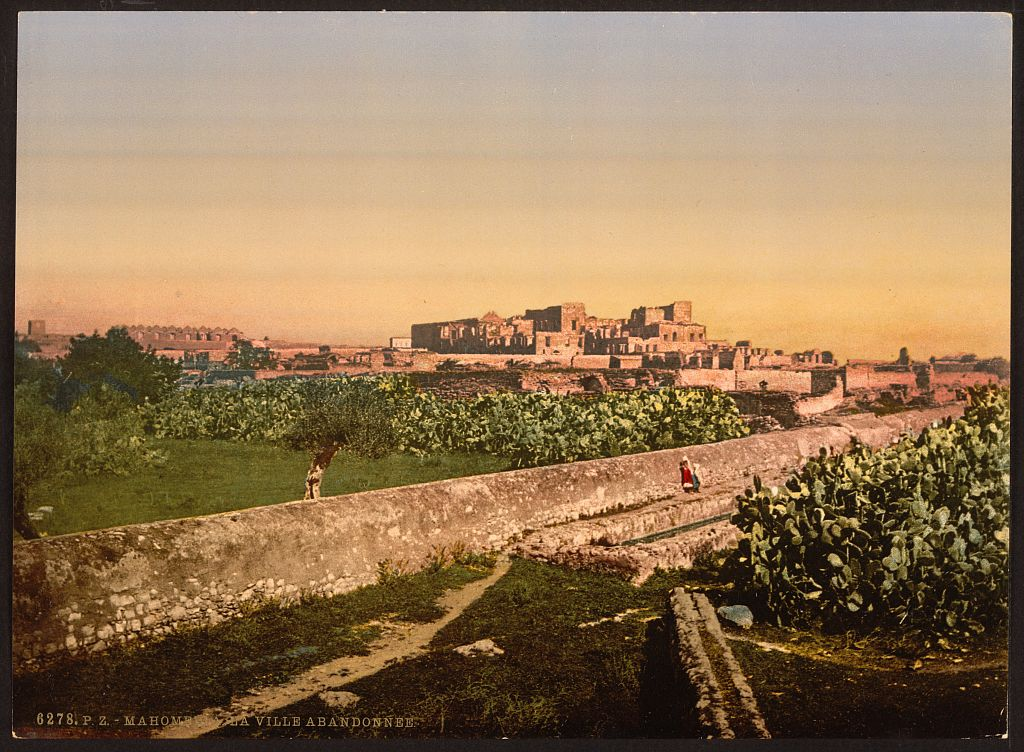
Mohamedia Palace

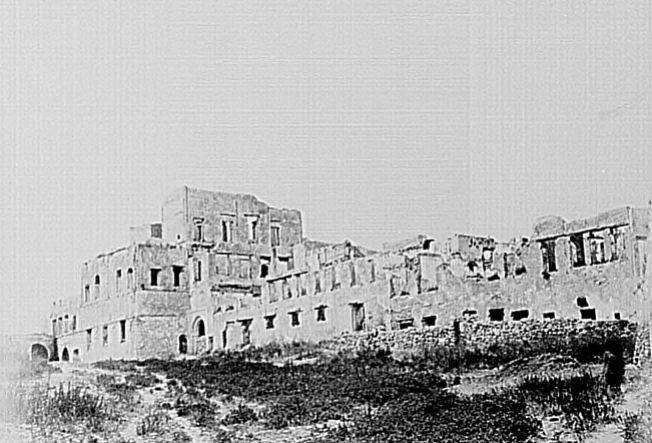
Mohamedia Palace ruins in 1885

Mohamedia Palace was a palace of the Tunisian Beys, in the town of Mohamedia, Tunisia. It was constructed as a retreat from the capital, Tunis, in the first half of the 19th century, but was already abandoned in the second half. Today, the palace is in ruins.

== History ==
Mustapha Bey (1786–1837) intended Mohamedia palace as a retreat for leisure and relaxation away from the capital. Under his successor, Ahmad I Bey (1805–1855), the plans for the palace became more ambitious, a Tunisian Versailles.

Impressed by the splendor of the Palace of Versailles during his visit to France at the invitation of King Louis Philippe I (1773–1850), Ahmad I Bey conceived the idea of a Tunisian Versailles upon his return. From then on, he devoted all his time and the limited resources of his country, the Beylik of Tunis, to the costly realization of his dream. In the founder's vision, the palace was meant to surpass that of the Bardo palace.

On the chosen slopes, served by the road connecting Tunis to Zaghouan along the ancient Roman aqueduct, the residences of officials and merchants, army barracks, new markets near the mosque and hammam, and the palaces of General Mrabet and key ministers, including Mustapha Khaznadar (1817–1878), succeeded one another. Higher up, the palace of Ahmad I Bey dominated the entire new city.

While not completely abandoning the traditional style still present in some parts of the palace, there was a hope to match the imposing proportions and architectural style of European constructions in this new building. The interior was adorned with Carrara marble, Naples ceramics, modern furniture, as well as chandeliers and mirrors from Venice. In addition, the palace was surrounded by sumptuous gardens.

The palace was rarely used by the Bey despite the enormous cost of its construction. Ahmad I Bey spent more time at the palaces in Bardo and La Goulette. In the latter, he would spend his final days.

Upon the death of Ahmed I Bey in 1855, his successor Muhammed II Bey (1811–1859) not only transferred the furniture from Mohamedia but also all the materials—marbles, ceramics, and woodwork—to his new palace in La Marsa, the Dar al-Taj Palace. Today, abandoned and nearly forgotten, only gigantic ruins in an advanced state of decay remain of the palace and its surrounding structures.

The Mohamedia Palace was also named Salehia after the name of the local saint Sidi Saleh.

== Literature ==
- Gandolphe, Marcel (1941). Résidences Beylicales : Le Bardo- La Mohammedia- Kassar-Said - La Manouba – Hammam-Lif (in French). Tunis: Editions SAPI Tunisia.
- Revault, Jacques (1974). Palais et résidences d'été de la région de Tunis (XVIe-XIXe siècles) (in French). Paris: Editions du Centre National de la Recherche Scientifique. pp. 414–426. ISBN 2-222-01622-3.
- Abidi, Beya (2005). Palais des beys aux environs de la ville de Tunis, El-Abdaliya à la Marsa et Dar el-Bey à Hammam-Lif (en arabe) (mémoire de master) (Thesis) (in Arabic). Tunis: Facultés des Lettres, des Arts et des Humanités de Manouba.
- L'Éveil d'une nation [exposition, Tunis, Palais Qsar es-Saïd, du 27 novembre 2016 au 27 février 2017] (in French). Tunis: Officina Libraria. 2016. p. 246. ISBN 978-88-99765-25-5.
