= Dar al-Taj Palace =

Former beylical Palace in La Marsa, Tunisia

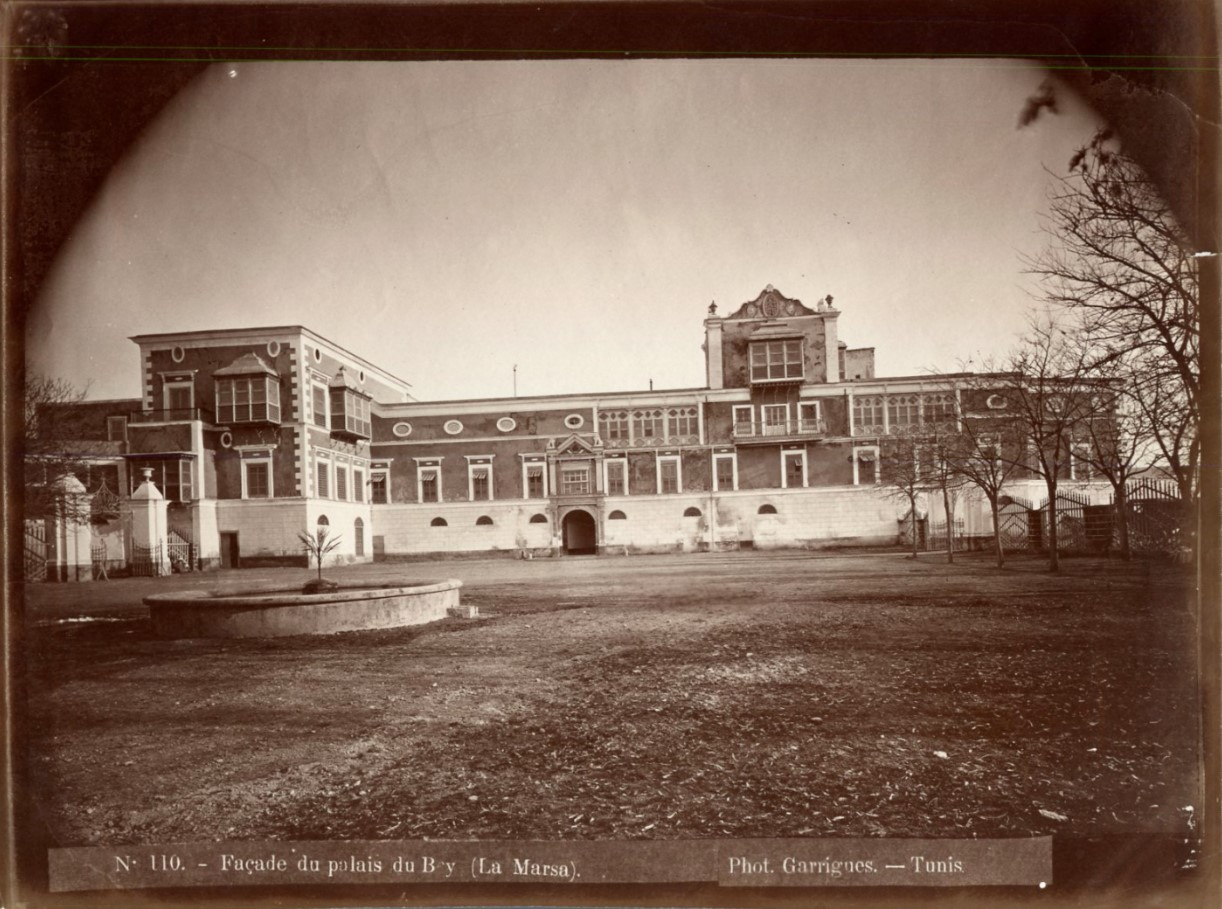
The Dar al-Taj Palace in La Marsa

Dar al-Taj Palace was a palace of the Tunisian Beys, in La Marsa, Tunisia. It is 18 kilometers northeast from Tunis. The palace was constructed as a summer palace and retreat from the capital. It was destroyed in the years after the Tunisian independence. Nothing remains now, except for postcards that serve as reminders of the past glory of the Dar al-Taj.

The palace sometimes is also named Qsar al-Taj or Ksar Tej. The name literally means "House of the Crown".

== History ==
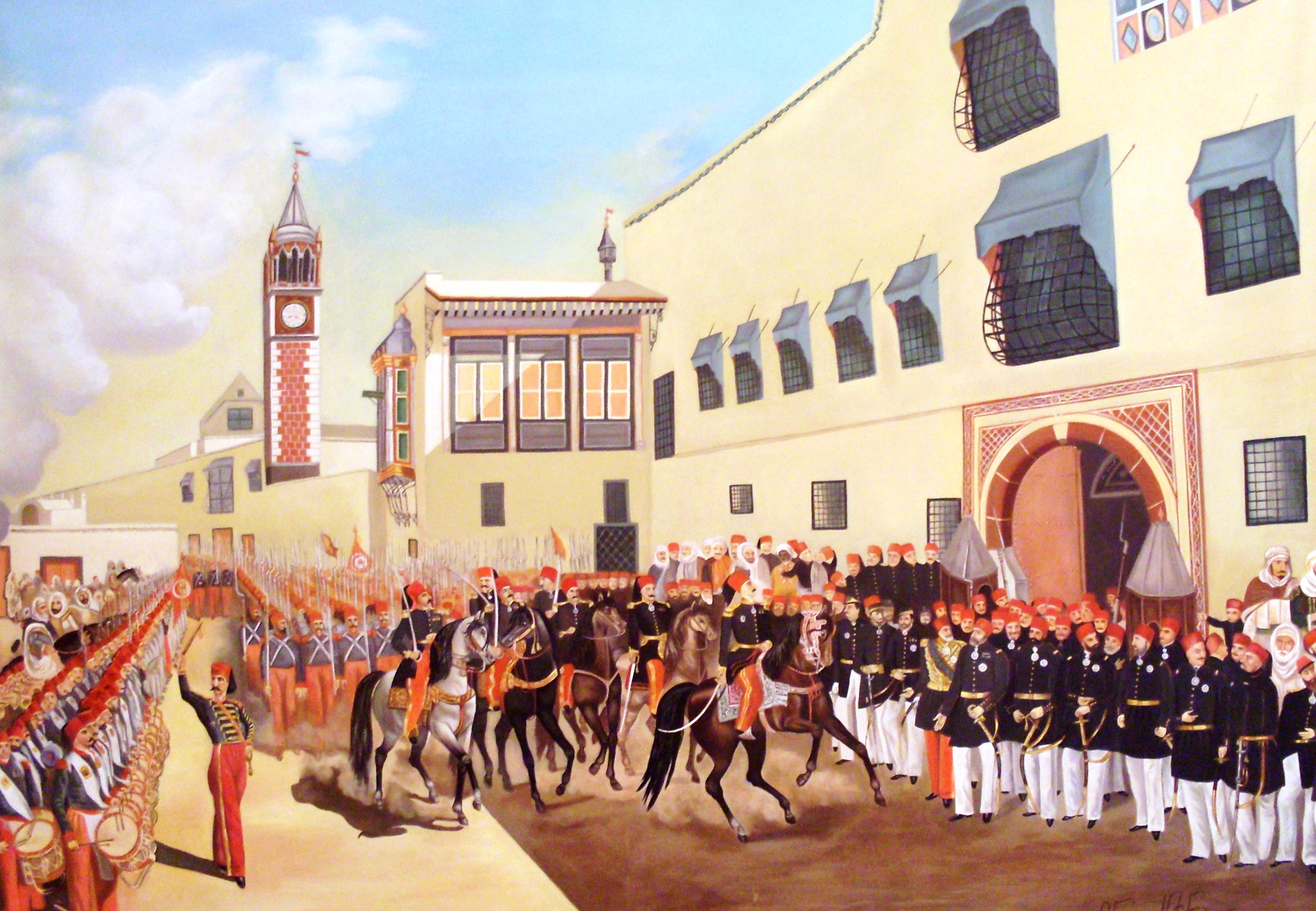
Parade at the palace of a contingent returning from the Crimea by Auguste Moynier in 1861

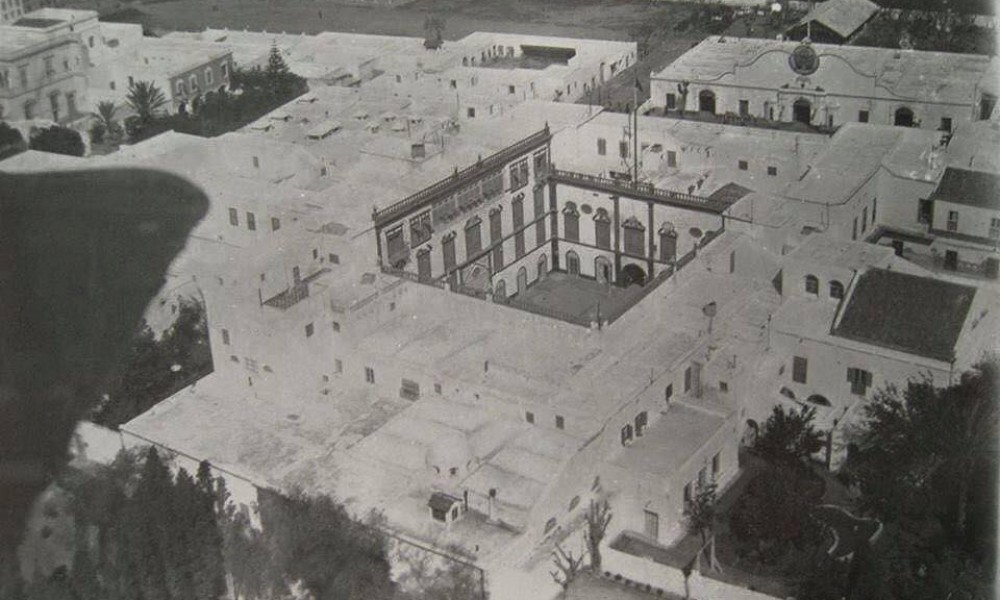
The Dar al-Taj Palace from the air

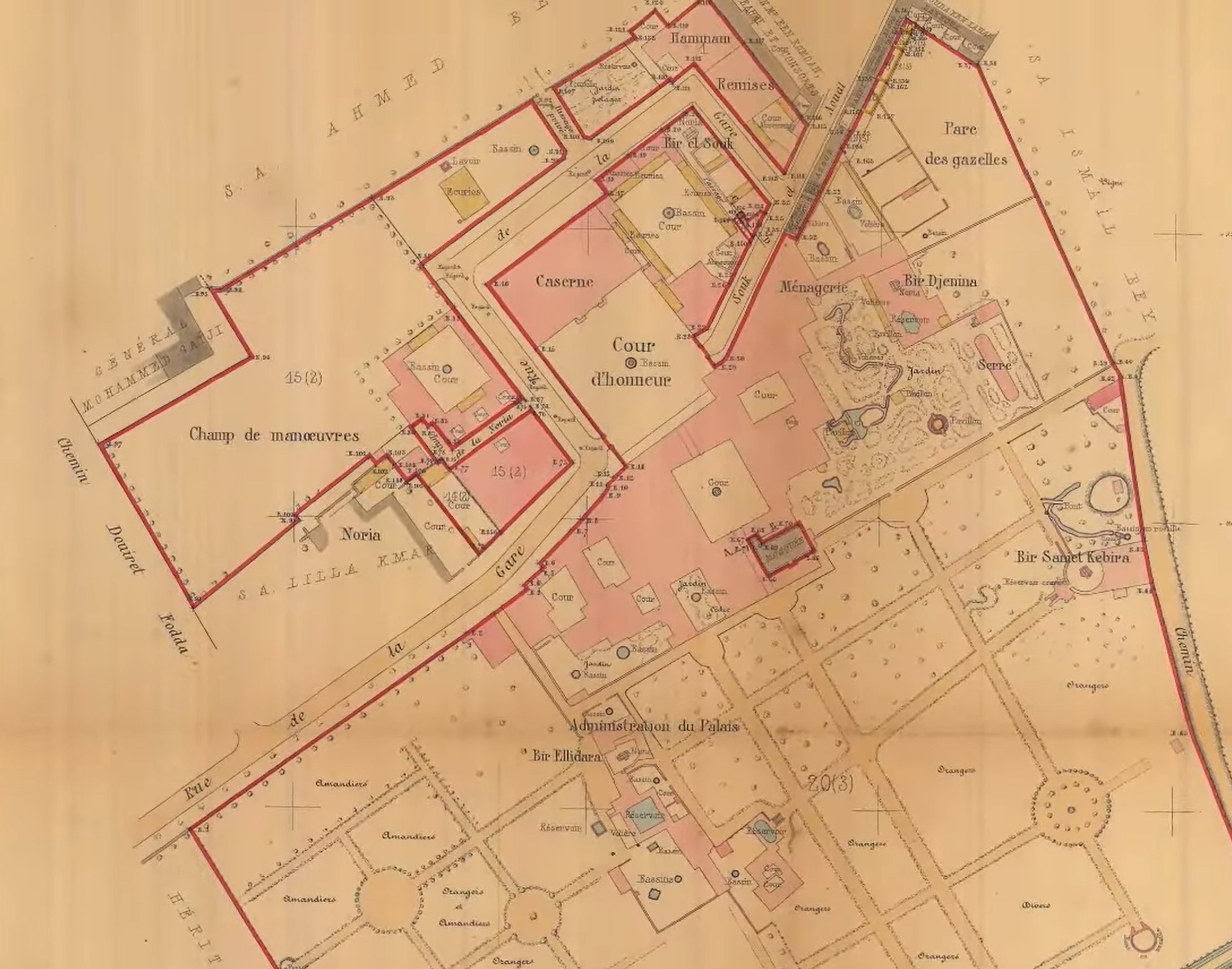
Plan of the Dar al-Taj Palace

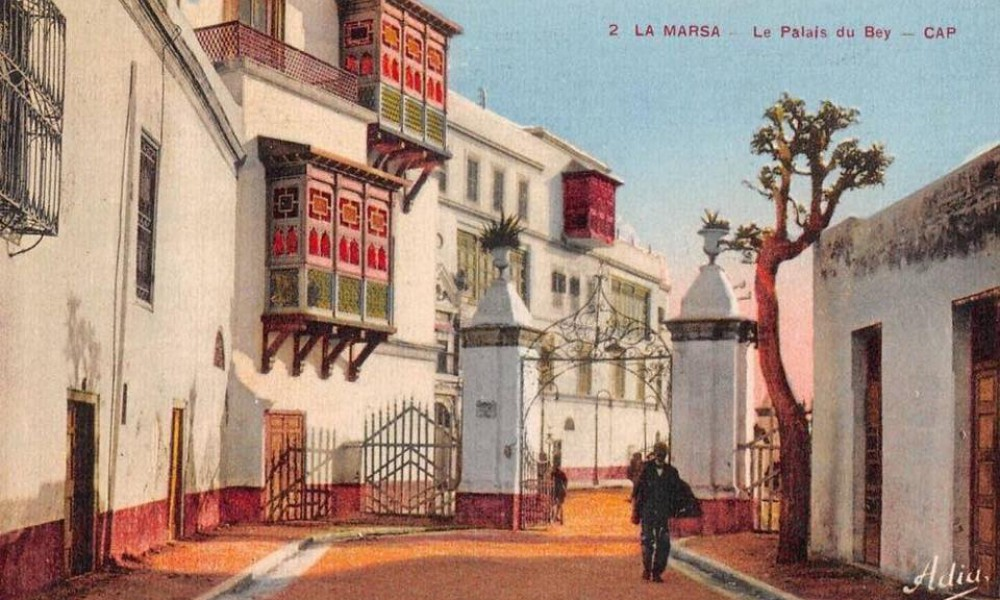
The Dar al-Taj Palace

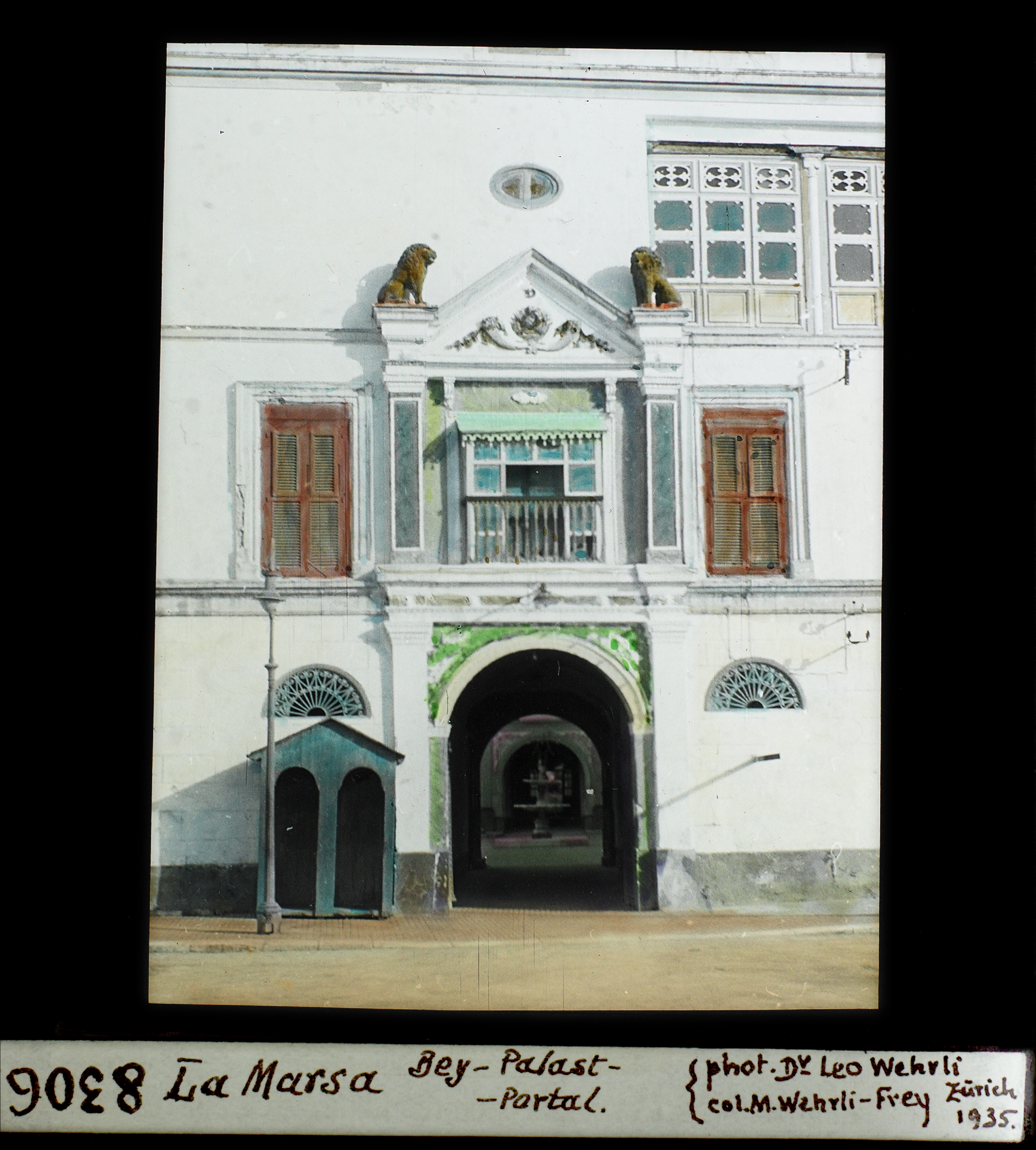
The entrance to the Dar al-Taj Palace

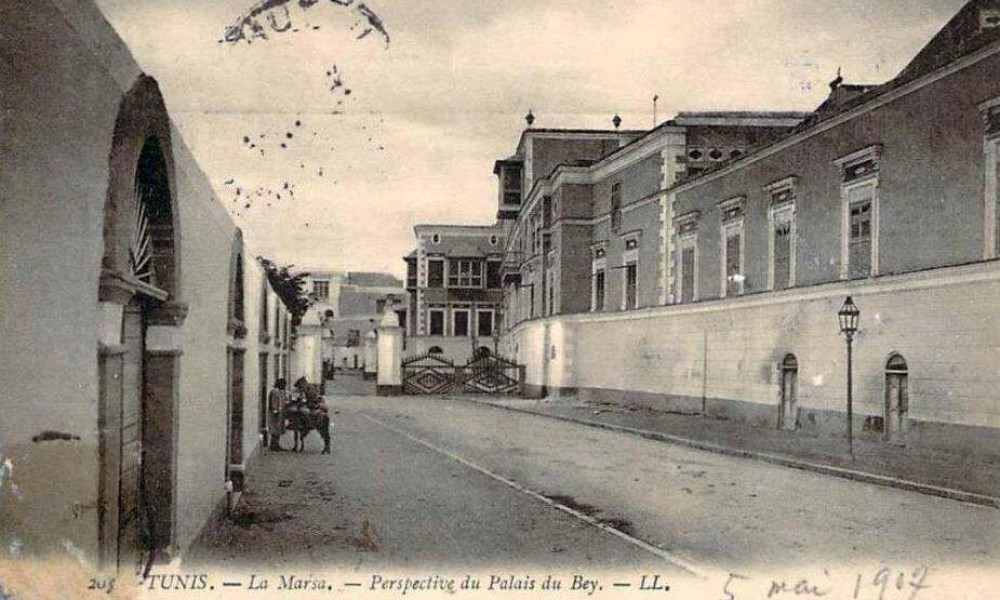
The side of the palace

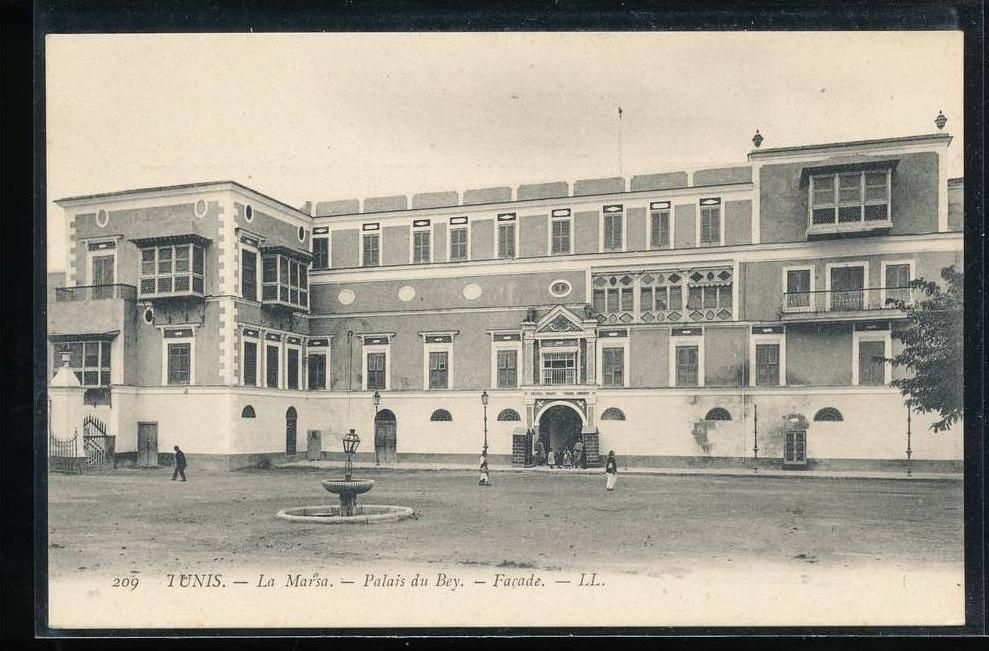
Front of the palace

Located not far from the Hafsid palace complex of Abdalliya, the Dar al-Taj palace was founded during the first quarter of the 19th century by Mahmud Bey (1757–1824), and its construction was continued by his son Hussein II Bey (1784–1835). However, the Dar al-Taj palace was completely transformed by Muhammed II Bey (1811–1859), who made it his favorite residence. He modernized it and significantly expanded it. To remodel and beautify the palace, he did not hesitate, starting from 1855, to completely strip the Mohamedia Palace, which belonged to his predecessor and cousin Ahmad I Bey (1805–1855), to recover all the materials he deemed necessary to magnify his own palace.

Neglected by his successor Muhammad III as-Sadiq (1813–1882), who preferred the palaces of the Bardo and Qsar Es-Saïd (or Ksar Saïd), the Dar al-Taj palace became, after the death of Sadiq Bey in 1882, the main residence of the Husainid dynasty, especially under Ali III Bey (1817–1902) and Nasir Bey (1855–1922).

On 8 June 1883, the Conventions of La Marsa were signed in the palace. This treaty provided that France would repay Tunisia's international debt, so it could abolish the International Debt Commission and thereby removed any obstacles to a French protectorate in Tunisia.

In the early years following Tunisian independence in 1956, the palace was demolished at the instigation of the Minister of the Interior, Taïeb Mhiri. He also oversaw the destruction of other monuments of the Husainid dynasty.

== Description by Henry Dunant ==
Swiss businessman and humanitarian Henry Dunant (1828–1910), who visited Dar al-Taj upon its completion by Mohammed Bey, expressed his admiration:

When a foreigner arrives in La Marsa, everything tells him and makes him feel that he is approaching the residence of an Eastern sovereign. There is activity around the palace: the carriages of the courtiers, pulled by expensive horses or mules; officers, generals on horseback, the prince's servants or Moors in grand costumes; European consuls in their carriages; foreigners, travelers, not to mention caravans of Arabs, Maltese, Jews; or camels, mule drivers, and all kinds of teams coming and going from Tunis to La Marsa.

He adds about the palace itself:

When one has permission to pass through the palace gate, there is a spacious first courtyard, paved in white marble, and remarkably clean. Rare birds roam freely, and charming little gazelles are completely familiar. In the center of this courtyard is a large alabaster fountain with three superimposed basins and topped with a spire adorned with a crescent. Several doors open onto this vast courtyard: one of these Moorish-style doors is made of marbles of various colors [...] The Bey often receives in a vast gallery of Moorish style with stained glass windows of a thousand colors, which contribute to giving the arabesques of the ceiling and walls a fantastic appearance.

== Architecture ==
The major reconstruction, expansion, and embellishment work carried out by Mohammed Bey resulted in a vast complex in the Italianate style popular at that time (second half of the 19th century). On the outside, facing the gardens, a long baroque facade appears, punctuated on the floors by rectangular windows and balconies with Mashrabiya. In the middle of it, the main entrance has an arched opening topped with a Mashrabiya. These two bays are framed by pilasters; the whole is crowned with a triangular pediment flanked by two lion sculptures. As for the interior of the palace, excluding the common areas that have traditional vaulted construction, the style of the apartments, reception rooms, and throne room betrays strong European influences. These are further emphasized by Western imported furniture.

While on the ground floor, the architecture of the dependencies follows the rules of traditional Tunisian architecture, with the distribution of food stores, kitchens, and sheds around open-air courtyards, the same cannot be said for the noble floor above, where living rooms and reception halls are distributed around new covered patios.

== Literature ==
- d'Anthouard, Jean (1950). "La Marsa et ses Palais" (PDF). Bulletin Économique et Social de la Tunisie (in French): 91–100.
- Revault, Jacques (1974). Palais et résidences d'été de la région de Tunis (XVIe-XIXe siècles) (in French). Paris: Editions du Centre National de la Recherche Scientifique. pp. 414–426. ISBN 2-222-01622-3.
- Abidi, Beya (2005). Palais des beys aux environs de la ville de Tunis, El-Abdaliya à la Marsa et Dar el-Bey à Hammam-Lif (en arabe) (mémoire de master) (Thesis) (in Arabic). Tunis: Facultés des Lettres, des Arts et des Humanités de Manouba.
- L'Éveil d'une nation [exposition, Tunis, Palais Qsar es-Saïd, du 27 novembre 2016 au 27 février 2017] (in French). Tunis: Officina Libraria. 2016. p. 246. ISBN 978-88-99765-25-5.
