= Hassan Asfour =

Palestinian politician (born 1950)

- حسن عصفور

Head of the Civil Society Organizations Authority
- In office 5 June 2002 – 2003
- President: Yasser Arafat

Minister of Negotiation Affairs
- President: Yasser Arafat

Minister of State
- President: Yasser Arafat

Member of the Palestinian Legislative Council
- In office 1996–2006
- Constituency: Khan Yunis

Director General of the Negotiations Affairs Department of the PLO
- In office May 1994 – 1999

Personal details
- Born: 24 April 1950 (age 76) Abasan al-Saghira, Palestine
- Party: Independent
- Other political affiliations: Jordanian Communist Party; Palestinian Communist Party
- Education: University of Baghdad
- Occupation: Politician, media figure

Hassan Asfour (born 24 April 1950) is a Palestinian politician and media figure who participated in drafting the 1993 Oslo Accords and subsequently held ministerial portfolios. He is a graduate of the University of Baghdad with a degree in agricultural engineering and studied philosophy at the Institute for Social Research in Moscow. A former member of both the Palestinian National Council and the Palestinian Legislative Council, he is a sharp critic of the Hamas and questions the 7 October narrative. In March 2005, he resigned from all government posts due to his long-standing differences that predated the assumption of office by the newly elected president, Mahmoud Abbas.

Following the conclusion of his tenure in the Legislative Council in the wake of the 2006 elections, he entered the media sector, directing and editing the Amad Media website.

== Early life ==
He studied in Iraq, where he was initially non-partisan and took an interest in broader national affairs under the prevailing influence of Gamal Abdel Nasser at the time, before subsequently adopting communism during his stay in Iraq.

== Positions ==
=== October 11 attacks ===
He describes the events of 7 October as an Israeli conspiracy, the preparations for which began in 2016–2017, and asserts that Hamas served as an instrument therein.

=== Oslo Accords ===
He considers the Oslo Accords to have been terminated as of 28 September 2000, when Ariel Sharon entered the Al-Aqsa Mosque compound, an event that resulted in the deaths of 18 Palestinians. From that date onward, he maintains that discussion of the Accords holds no further value, given that Israel itself does not recognize them and that those currently holding power are opposed to them. He further asserts that these same individuals were responsible for the assassination of Yitzhak Rabin because he signed the Oslo Accords, and that they subsequently dismantled the political entity that had emerged pursuant to those Accords.

== Books ==
- Hamas and the Hijacking of Gaza: Political Notes by Hassan Asfour (Sanabel Book Publishing, 2014)
