= Amad =

Amad or AMAD may refer to:

== Given name ==
- Amad (footballer) (born 2002), Ivorian footballer
- Amad Al Hosni (born 1984), Omani footballer

== Media ==
- Amad Media, a Palestinian news website
- Amadnews, an Iranian news website

== Other ==
- Activity median aerodynamic diameter (AMAD), distribution of particle sizes in the context of radiation protection
- Airframe Mounted Accessory Drive, a multi-function gearbox used in jet-propelled aircraft
- `Amad, village in western central Yemen

== See also ==
- Amand, Qazvin, a village in Qazvin Province, Iran
