= Mustapha Khaznadar =

Tunisian politician and reformer

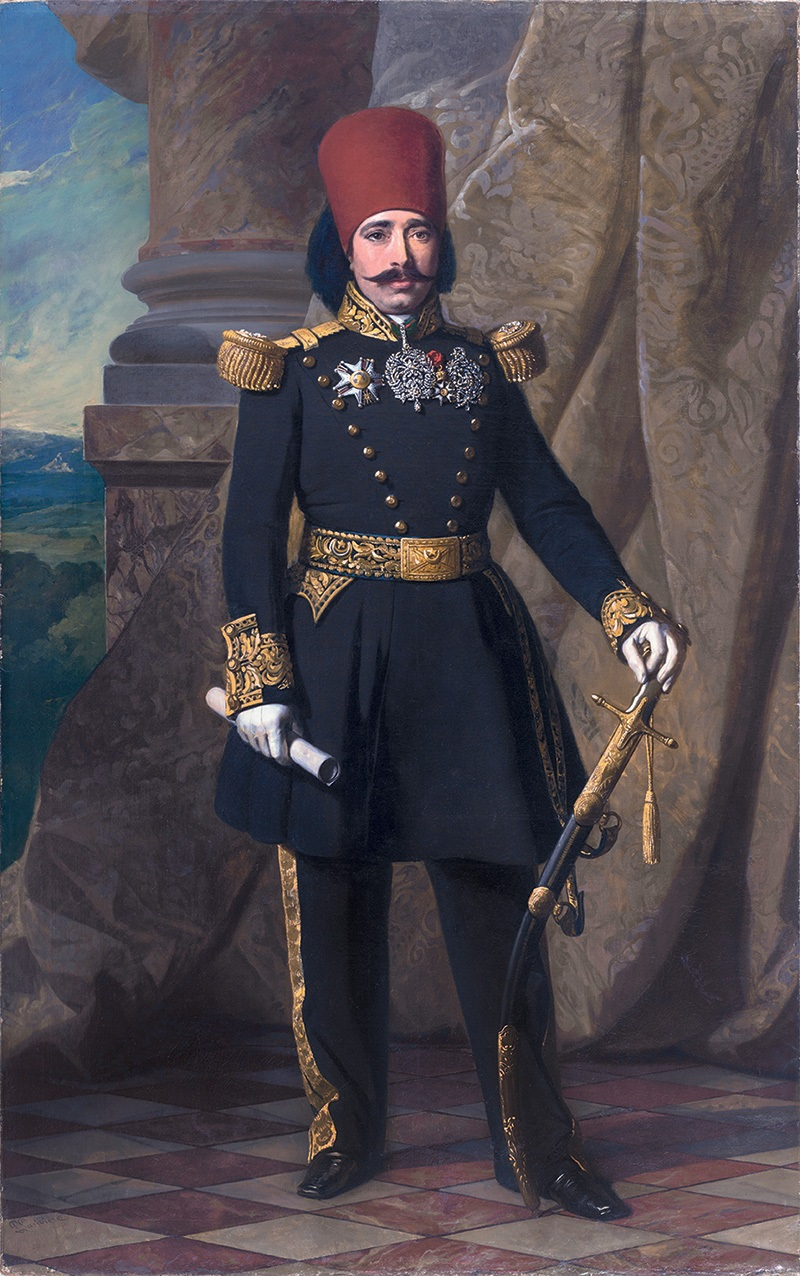
- A portrait of Mustapha Khaznadar in 1846 by Charles-Philippe Larivière.

Prime Minister of Tunisia
- In office 1855 – 22 October 1873
- Monarchs: Muhammad II; Muhammad III
- Preceded by: Mustapha Saheb Ettabaa
- Succeeded by: Kheireddine Pacha

Minister of Finance
- In office 1837 – 22 October 1873
- Monarchs: Ahmad I Muhammad II; Muhammad III

Personal details
- Born: August 3, 1817 Kardamyla, Ottoman Chios (now Greece)
- Died: July 26, 1878 (aged 60) Tunis, Beylik of Tunis
- Resting place: Tourbet el Bey
- Spouse: Lalla Oum Kalthoum
- Children: Muhammad Khaznadar

Mustapha Khaznadar (Arabic: مصطفى خزندار; 1817–1878), born as Georgios Halkias Stravelakis (Greek: Γεώργιος Χαλκιάς Στραβελάκης) was a Tunisian politician who served as Prime Minister of the Beylik of Tunis from 1855 to 1873. He was one of the most influential people in modern Tunisian history.

== Biography ==
=== Early life ===
Mustapha Khaznadar was born in the village of Kardamyla on the Greek island of Chios as Georgios Halkias Stravelakis in 1817. In January 1822, rebels from the neighboring islands of Samos arrived on Chios and declared their independence from the Ottoman Empire, the Ottoman sultan soon sent an army of about 40,000 to the island of Chios, where roughly 52,000 Greek inhabitants were massacred and tens of thousands of women and children were taken into slavery. During the Chios massacre, Georgios's father, the sailor Stephanis Halkias Stravelakis, was killed, while Georgios along with his brother Yannis were captured and sold into slavery by the Ottomans. He was then taken to Smyrna and then Constantinople, where he was sold as a slave to an envoy of the Husainid Dynasty.

=== Religious conversion and political career ===
The young Georgios was taken by the family of Mustapha Bey, and was renamed Mustapha and forcibly converted to Islam. Later, he was passed to his son Ahmad I Bey while he was still crown prince. The young Mustapha now worked first as the prince's private treasurer before becoming Ahmad's state treasurer (Khaznadar). He managed to climb to the highest offices of the Tunisian state, married Princess Lalla Kalthoum in 1839 and was promoted to lieutenant-general of the army, made bey in 1840 and then speaker of the Grand Council from 1862 to 1878.

In 1864, Mustapha Khaznadar, then Prime Minister, during efforts to raise the taxation of the Tunisian peasants to meet the demands of the Ottoman Empire faced a rebellion, known as the Mejba Revolt, that almost overthrew the regime. However, the government was swift to act and ultimately suppressed the uprising.

Mustafa Khaznadar retained memories of his Greek origin and when he finally managed, he made contact with his remaining family and helped to pay for the education of his two (Greek) nephews. Khaznadar died in 1878 and is buried in the mausoleum of Tourbet el Bey, in the heart of the Medina of Tunis.

== Gallery ==
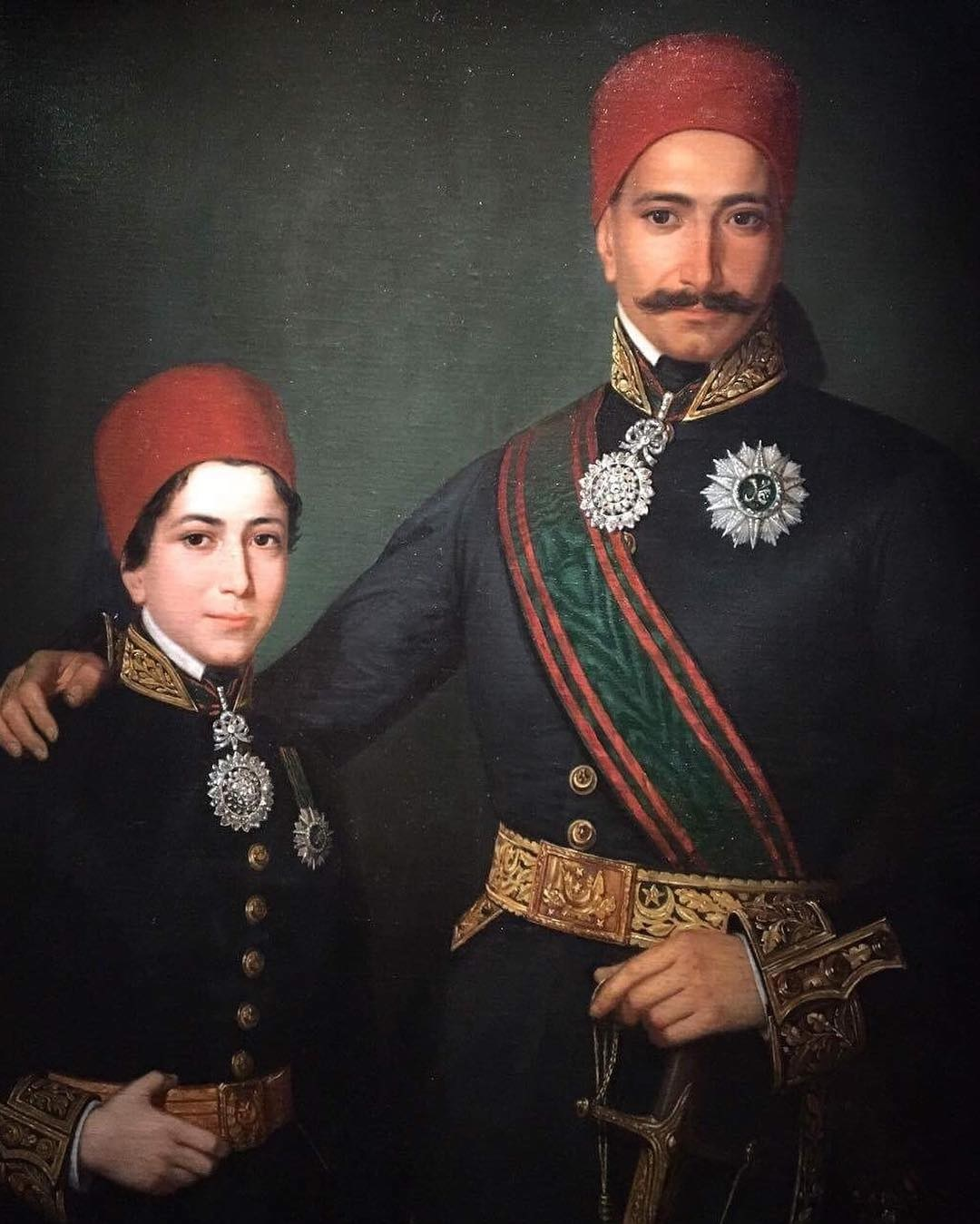
Painting of Mustapha Khaznadar and his son, Muhammad Khaznadar.

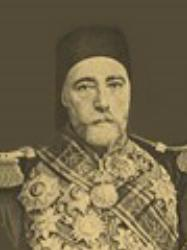
Khaznadar during his career as Prime Minister.

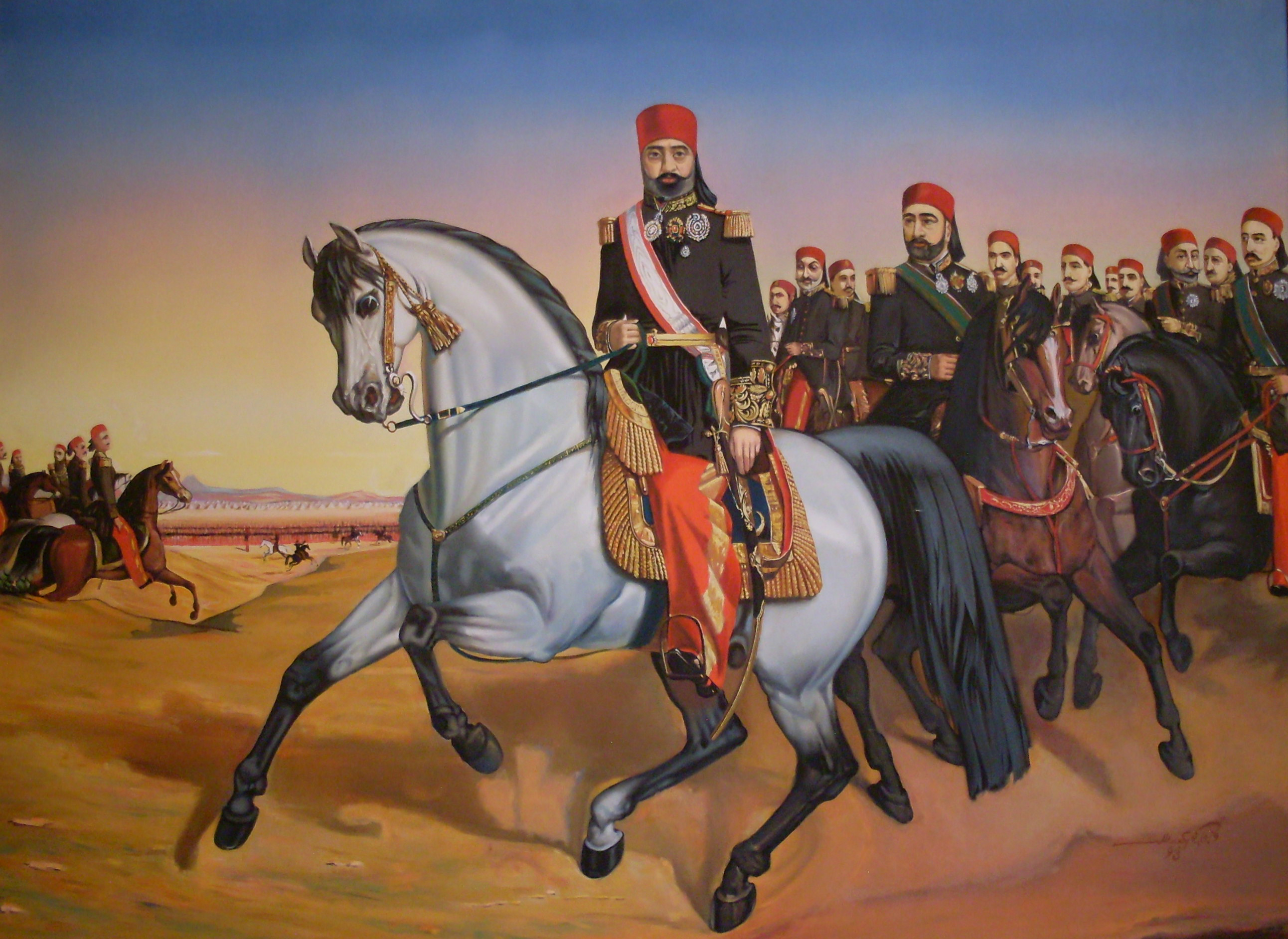
Equestrian portrait of Muhammad III, Khaznadar is just behind him.

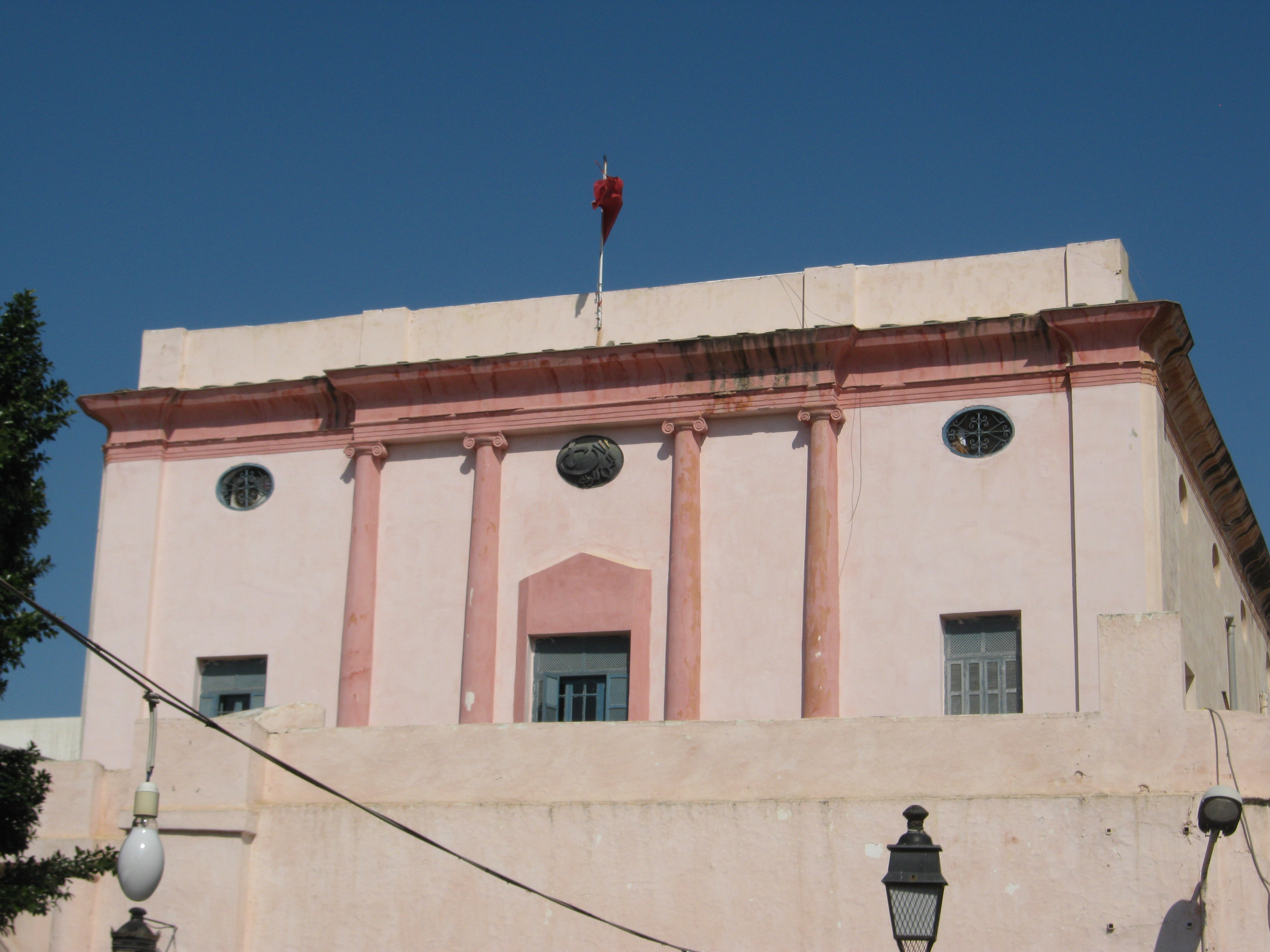
Khaznadar Palace, which he built for himself.

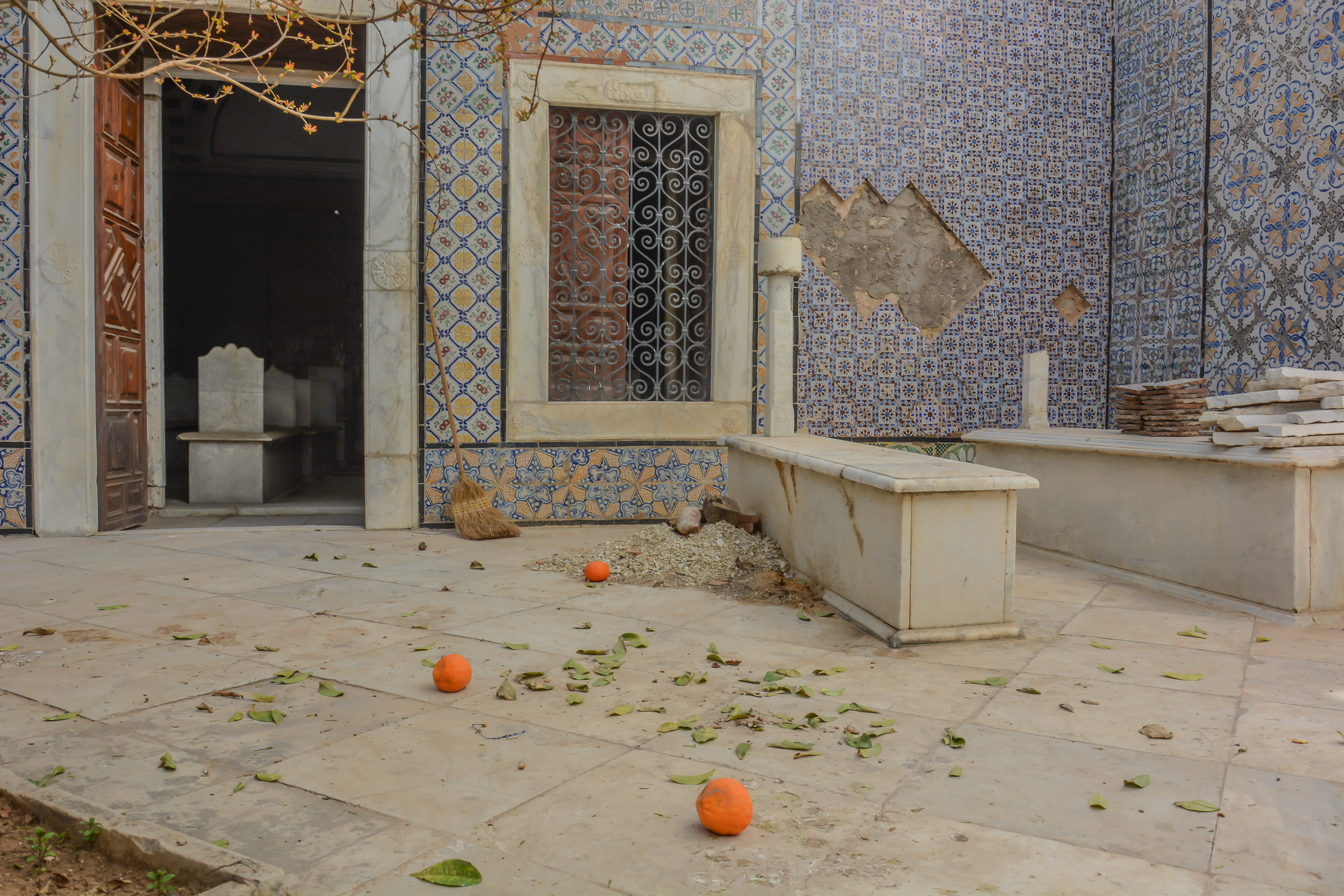
Tomb of Khaznadar in Tourbet el Bey, near his wife Lalla Kalthoum.

== In Culture ==
2018: Tej El Hadhra, a television series by Sami Fehri: Ahmed Landolsi.

== Honours ==
- Officer of the Order of the Blood (Nichan Dam) of Tunisia (1856)
- Officer of the Order of Glory (Nichan Iftikhar) of Tunisia

== See also ==
- Chios Massacre
- Greek Muslims
- Prime Minister of Tunisia
- The Mejba Revolt
- Mahmoud Ben Ayed
