= Mohamedia, Tunisia =

Coordinates: 36°41′N 10°09′E

Mohamedia al-Muhammadiya
- Town
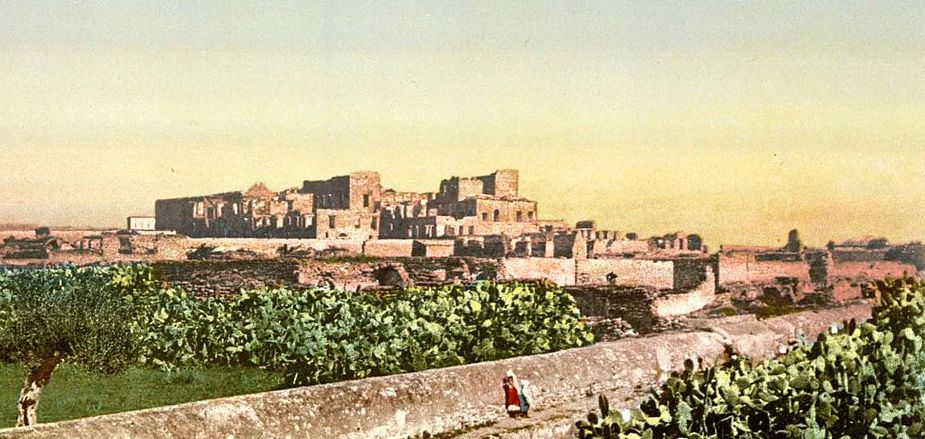
- Photograph of the ruins of Mohamedia, Tunisia, including Mohamedia Palace. This color photochrome print was made in 1899 in Tunis, Tunisia.
- Interactive map of Mohamedia
- Country: Tunisia
- Governorate: Ben Arous Governorate
- Delegation(s): Mohamedia
- Time zone: UTC+1 (CET)

Mohamedia is a town in Ben Arous Governorate, Tunisia. was governed by the joint municipality of Mohamedia before its becomes an independent municipality, it is also the seat of an eponymous governoral delegation.

Near the town are the ruins of Megalopolis a Roman Era civitas (town) of Roman Proconsulari.

Mohamedia was formerly known by the name of Ṭunbudha, and has been known by the current name of al-Muhammadiya since around the 11th century CE. The town grew up around the strategic Byzantine fortress of Tunbudha which, from its hilltop position, controlled the roads into Tunis and Carthage. Equipped with an Arab garrison soon after the Muslim conquest of Carthage by Hasan ibn al-Nu'man at the end of the 7th century, Tunbudha was the site of a rebellion in the 9th century. The local ruler, Mansur al-Tunbudhi, led the junds in revolt against the Aghlabid dynasty.
