= Ahmad I ibn Mustafa =

Bey of Tunis (1806–1855)

Ahmad I Bey
- Ahmad I Bey
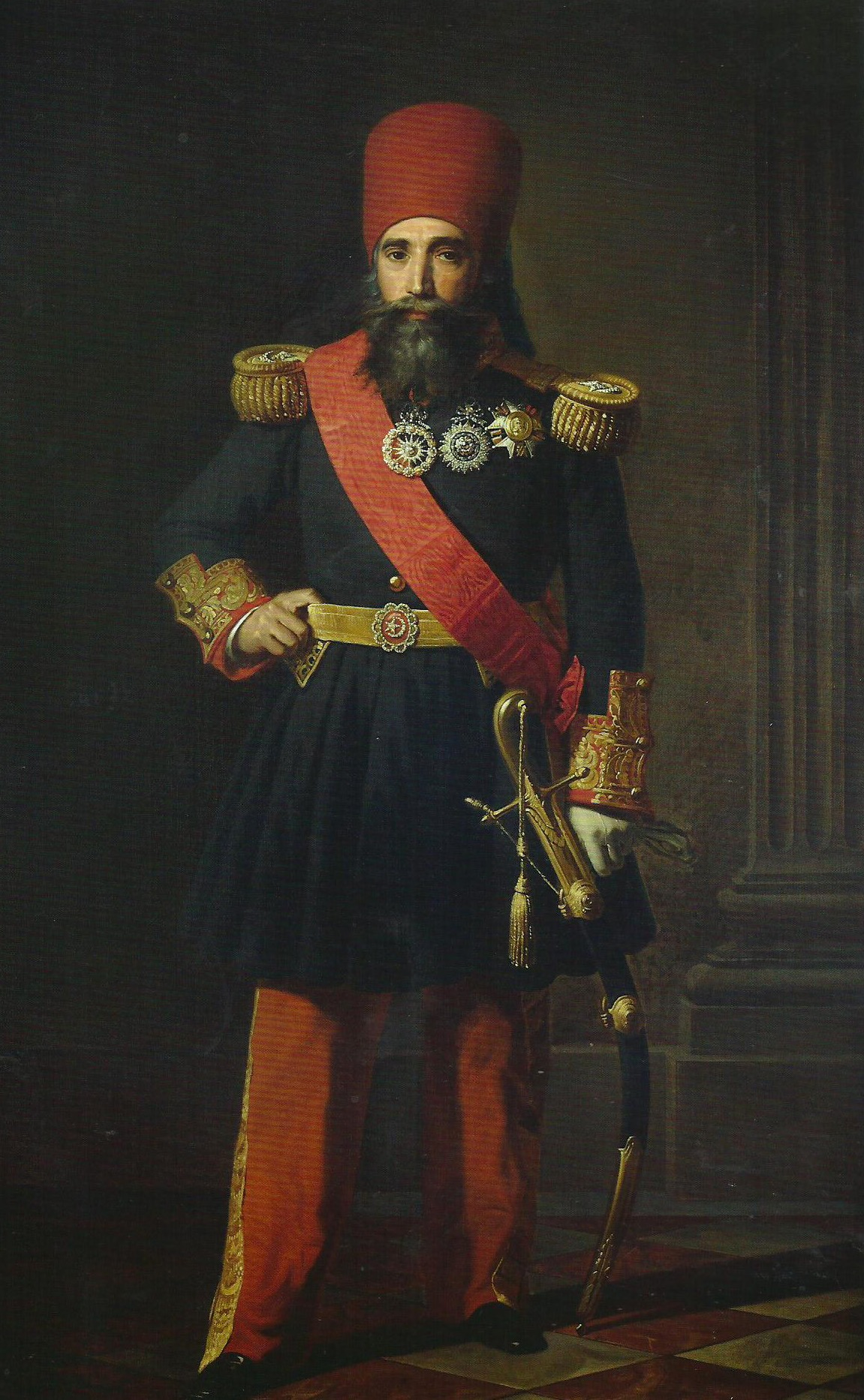
- Portrait by Charles-Philippe Larivière, 1846

Bey of Tunis
- Reign: 10 October 1837 – 30 May 1855
- Predecessor: Mustafa ibn Mahmud
- Successor: Muhammad II ibn al-Husayn
- Born: Ahmad I ibn Mustafa Bey; 2 December 1805; Tunis, Kingdom of Tunisia
- Died: 30 May 1855 (aged 49); La Goulette, Kingdom of Tunisia
- Burial: Tourbet el Bey, Tunis, Tunisia
- Spouse: Emina Baya Chelbi
- Dynasty: Husainides
- Father: Mustafa ibn Mahmud
- Mother: Francesca Rosso di Sofia
- Religion: Islam

Ahmad I ibn Mustafa (Arabic: أحمد الأول بن مصطفى), commonly referred to as Ahmed I Bey (Arabic: أحمد باي الأول ; 2 December 1805 – 30 May 1855) was the tenth Husainid Bey of Tunis, ruling from 1837 until his death. He was responsible for the abolition of slavery in Tunisia in 1846.

He succeeded his father Mustafa Bey on 10 October 1837. He had grand ambitions - to expand his army and create a modern navy; to build a new royal residence (Mohamedia Palace), a mint and modern institutions of education but neither he nor his brother-in-law the young Mustapha Khaznadar who served as his finance minister, had a clear idea of what such initiatives would cost. As a result, many of his projects became expensive failures which damaged the financial health of the country.

== Early life ==
Ahmad Bey’s family belonged to the Husainid dynasty, which traced its origins to Al-Husayn I ibn Ali, who established the ruling line in Tunisia in the early 18th century. His father, Mustafa Bey, was the Bey of Tunis from 1835 to 1837 and was renowned for his military leadership. His mother, Francesca Rosso di Sofia, was Italian and part of the royal household in the Bardo Palace. Ahmad Bey was born in Tunis on 2 December 1806 and spent his childhood in the royal residences of Bardo and La Marsa. He was raised alongside his brothers and other members of the Royal family, receiving an education in Islamic studies, languages, and military training, which prepared him for his future role as ruler and reformer of the Tunisian state.

== Modernising ruler ==
According to the Tunisian historian Mohamed Bayram V, the Bey's reforms were focused on state structures, the army and education. He established a modern structure of government and gave his high officials the title of 'minister'. His senior ministers were his Grand Vizier Mustafa Sahib at-Taba'a, Mustapha Khaznadar, Minister of Finance and of the Interior, Mustafa Agha as Minister of War, Mahmoud Khodja as Minister of the Navy and Giuseppe Raffo as Foreign Minister. At certain times Mahmoud Ben Ayed also served as Trade Minister, Kuchuk Muhammad in the honorific post of Minister in charge of the security home of Ahmad Bey's reforms wasted money, such as the large

Ahmad I ibn Mustafa
- Royal Family of Tunisia

frigate built at La Goulette that could not make it through the channel to the sea. of Tunis and Mohamed Lasram IV as Minister of the Pen. The historian Ibn Abi Dhiaf was the Bey's private secretary.

Among Ahmad Bey's successes may be counted the abolition of slavery in January 1846. To this may be added the formation of the military academy at Bardo in March 1840, which supported the development of the beylical army, numbering as many as 5,000 men in seven infantry regiments, four artillery regiments and two cavalry regiments.

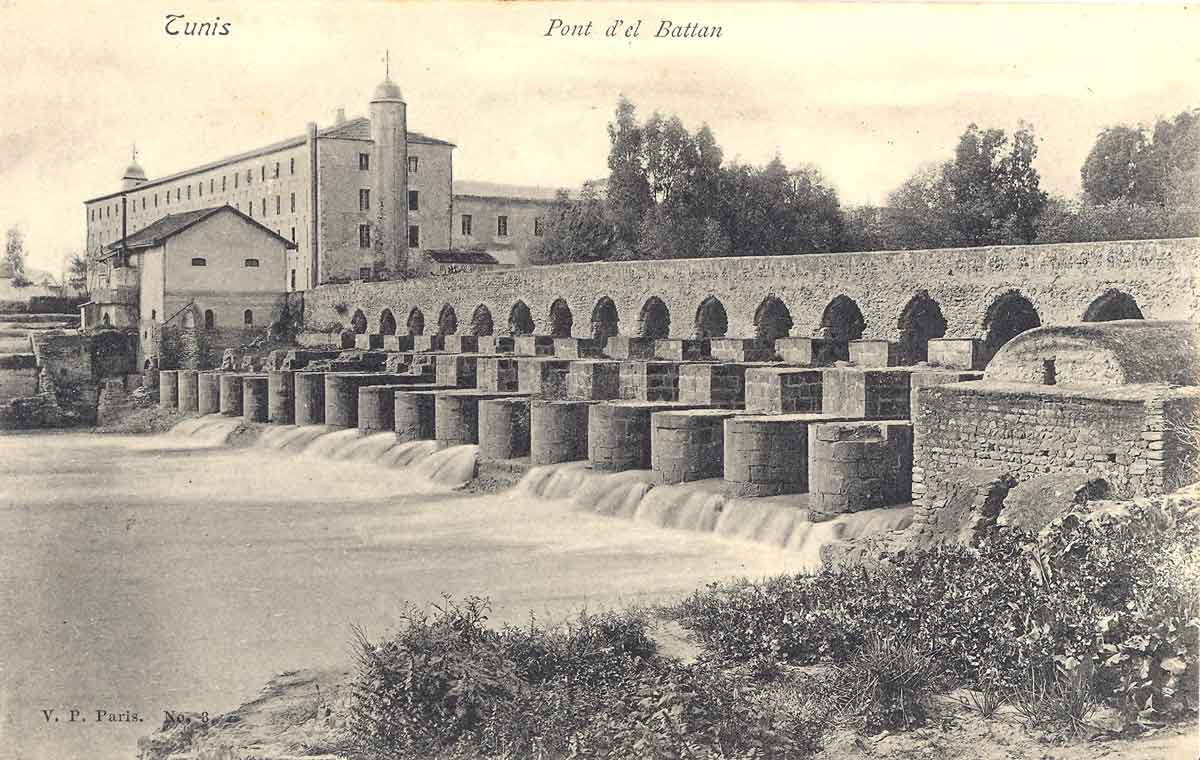
Building and bridge at El Battan on the river Medjerda, near Tebourba, which powered the water-wheels for the industrial textile works

At the same time, the Bey reformed religious education at the Al-Zaytuna Mosque, bringing in thirty professors, of whom fifteen were for the Maliki school of jurisprudence which prevailed in Tunisia, and fifteen followed the Hanafi school followed by the ruling families of the country who were of Turkish origin. All were appointed and salaried by the state and placed under the control of a sharia council dominated by the two leading jurists of their time, Sidi Brahim Riahi, the Maliki Grand Mufti and Mohamed Bayram IV, who was both the Hanafi Grand Mufti and the first in Tunisia to bear the title Shaykh al-Islam. The Bey also made a donation of a large number of Arabic manuscripts to the Zaytuna mosque.

State enterprise was also strongly encouraged. The businessman Mahmoud Ben Ayed was charged with building a small industrial complex to meet the needs of the new army. In 1840 a textile works was established at Tebourba, powered first by water-wheel and later by steam engines imported from Great Britain. Tanneries were also built, as was a cannon foundry at Bardo, a gunpowder works and a flour-mill at Djedeida.

Supporting these innovations were new government offices - the rabta managing state grain silos; the ghaba in charge of olive oil forests; and the ghorfa, the central state procurement office, as well as a mint at Bardo.

Not all of his initiatives were successful however – he had a new frigate built at La Goulette which was so large it could not fit in the channel down to the sea.

== Tentative reforms ==
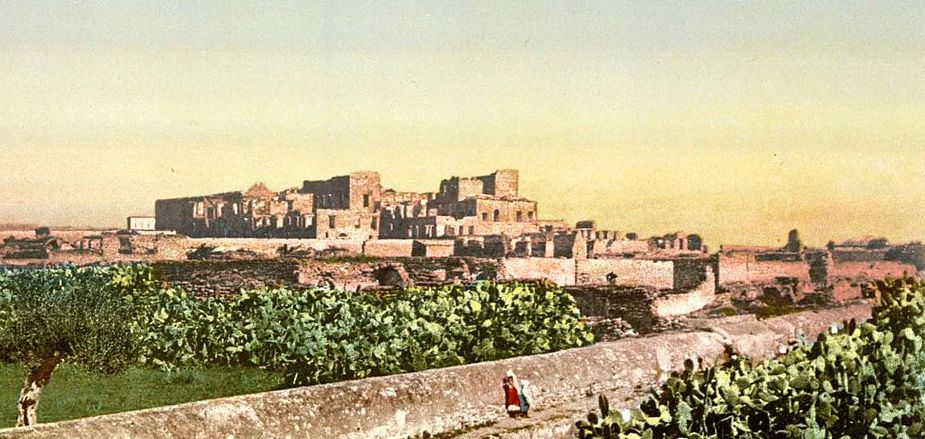
Ruins of the Mohamedia palace in 1899

Ahmad Bey's modernisations had little impact on the economy or the life of Tunis, or on the institutions of the Regency. He did not appear to be much interested in urban developments or the improvement of Tunis, other than rebuilding the Bab al Jazira mosque, and restoring the Bab el Bhar in 1847 and 1848. More of his attention went on the royal palaces at the Bardo, La Goulette and Mohamedia. The latter, known as the Salehia after the name of the local saint Sidi Saleh, was rarely used by the Bey despite the enormous cost of its construction. Although he had a great desire for reform, particularly in economic and military matters, his initiatives ultimately had little success because of a poor understanding of their financial consequences and the lack of expertise in his government.

== Ottoman recognition ==
Soon after his accession, Ahmad Bey received the traditional Firman from the Sublime Porte which formally invested him with authority to rule from the Ottoman Empire and furnished him with the insignia of office. The Ottoman envoy, Osman Bey, arrived in la Goulette on 15 May 1838 on board a frigate. The following day, Osman Bey made his official entry into Tunis on horseback, preceded by all the ministers of the beylical cabinet who went before him until he was two leagues from the city. Before him were carried the sword of honour and the caftan to be presented to the Bey. He was escorted by spahis and followed by a large contingent of regular troops and Arab cavalry. Three days after his official entry into the city, the envoy presented himself at the Bardo Palace to formally invest Ahmad Bey with his insignia of office and present gifts. Named as a Divisional General in the Ottoman army in May 1838, he was later promoted by the Sultan to the rank of Marshal on 14 August 1840. This was the first time that a Bey of Tunis had held a rank higher than Divisional General. The purpose of these honours is thought to have been to emphasise the supremacy of the Ottoman Empire over the Regency of Tunis.

== Relations with France ==
Under a treaty with France signed in 1830 by Hussein Bey, a piece of land in Carthage had been ceded to allow the erection of a monument to Louis IX of France who had died there during the Eighth Crusade. On 25 August 1840 the first stone was laid in the cathedral of Carthage. Ahmad Bey also permitted the Christian community of Tunis, consisting mainly of European merchants, to enlarge their small church near the Bab el Bhar.

In June and July 1846 the Duke of Montpensier, son of King Louis Philippe of France visited Tunis and Carthage. He was received with great solemnity by Ahmad Bey. During this visit the idea of a reciprocal visit of the Bey to France was proposed. This visit was organised by his advisor Giuseppe Raffo (whose sister was married to his uncle) and the French consul, and took place in November 1846. King Louis Philippe received Ahmad Bey with great ceremony. This visit confirmed the Bey's wish to modernise his country by learning from Europe. An 1897 article in La Revue tunisienne described its effect on his plans:

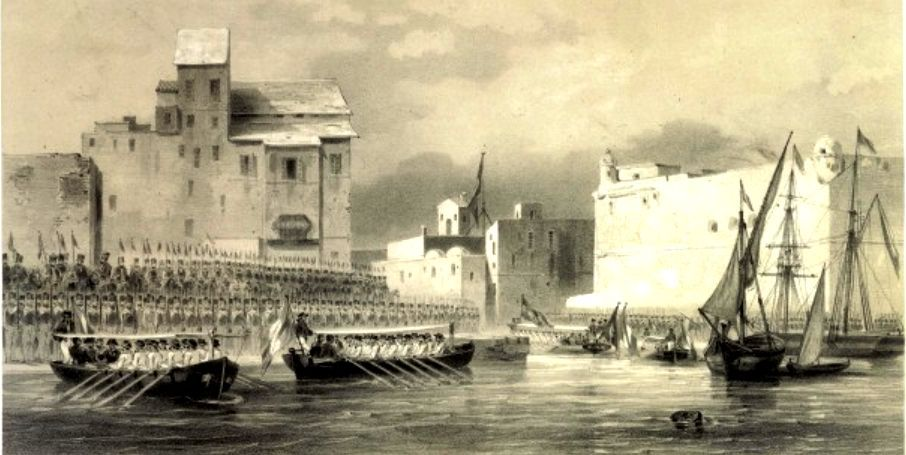
The duc de Montpensier received at La Goulette in June 1846 by a guard of honour of the Beylical army. To the left is a portion of the Al Sharfiya summer palace, which no longer remains.

Among all the marvels he had occasion to admire, he was most particularly struck by the ingenious applications of industrial engineering; he conceived at that time the noble project of pulling native industry out of the routine into which it had fallen by encouraging it to embark on the road to progress and of endowing his country with modern industry, equipped with the means of production, of which the economic benefits had been revealed to him.

The Bey's visit to France, and the fact that he had been received with the honours customarily reserved for an independent sovereign, displeased the Ottoman authorities as the Bey was, at least theoretically, an Ottoman vassal.

== Personal life ==
Although most other rulers of his dynasty in the 18th and 19th centuries maintained a harem as well as having official wives, Ahmad Bey had only one wife and one concubine. Before the abolition of slavery, he habitually offered to his courtiers any odalisques given to him as presents. He had two children who died in infancy, so he died without direct issue. and was succeeded by his cousin Muhammad Bey.

He died in 1855 in the summer palace of Sharfiya, at La Goulette, and was buried in the Tourbet el Bey in the Medina of Tunis.

== In popular culture ==
- Ahmed Bey appears as the lead character of the 2018 Tunisian TV series Tej El Hadhra directed by Sami Fehri.
- Ahmed Bey's diplomatic consul from the United States of America was John Howard Payne (1791-1852) the dramatist responsible for Clari, the Maid of Milan and the world famous song "Home, Sweet Home" Payne's interactions with the Bey of Tunisia were detailed in Gabriel Harrison's The Life and Writings of John Howard Payne

== See also ==
- Tunisian navy under Ahmed Bey
