= Amad Media =

Palestinian news website

Amad Media is a Palestinian news website generally associated with opposition to Palestinian Authority President Mahmud Abbas, particularly Muhammad Dahlan. Palestinian activist and politician Hassan Asfour runs and edits the website from Cairo, Egypt.

In 2017, the Palestinian Authority blocked Amad News and 10 other Palestinian news websites from being accessed in the West Bank.
