= Muhammad II ibn al-Husayn =

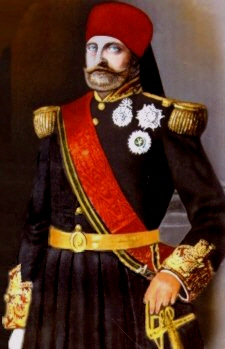
- Portrait by Auguste Moynier, 1861

Bey of Tunis
- Reign: 30 May 1855 – 22 September 1859
- Predecessor: Ahmad I ibn Mustafa
- Successor: Muhammad III as-Sadiq
- Born: Muhammad II ibn al-Husayn Bey; 18 September 1811; Le Bardo, Kingdom of Tunisia
- Died: 22 September 1859 (aged 48); Dar al-Taj Palace, La Marsa, Kingdom of Tunisia
- Burial: Tourbet el Bey, Tunis, Tunisia
- Spouse: Lalla Aïcha
- Issue: Muhammad V an-Nasir; Sidi Hassine Bey; Sidi Saïd Bey; Lalla Fatima; Lalla Khadija; Lalla Salouha; Lalla Zoubeïda
- Dynasty: Husainides
- Father: Hussein II Bey
- Mother: Fatma Mestiri
- Religion: Islam

Muhammad II ibn al-Husayn (Arabic: محمد الثاني بن الحسين), commonly referred to as M'hamed Bey (Arabic: إمحمد باي ; 18 September 1811 – 22 September 1859) was the eleventh Husainid Bey of Tunis, ruling from 1855 until his death. He was the son of Al-Husayn II ibn Mahmud and his second wife Lalla Fatima al-Munastiri.

As Bey al-Mahalla (Heir Apparent) he had been awarded the rank of divisional general in the Ottoman army in August 1840, and was raised to the rank of marshal on 7 August 1855, shortly after he succeeded his cousin Ahmad Bey on 30 May 1855. He retained his predecessor's key minister Mustapha Khaznadar as Grand vizier and surrounded himself with competent ministers such as Kheireddine Pacha and Generals Hussain and Rustum as well as devoted counsellors including Mohamed Bayram IV, Mahmoud Kabadou and Ismaïl Caïd Essebsi.

== Early life ==
Mohamed Bey belonged to the Husainid dynasty, which ruled Tunisia from the early 18th century and traced its origins to Al-Husayn I ibn Ali, the dynasty’s founder. He was the son of Hussein II Bey, who governed Tunisia from 1824 to 1835 and played a key role in maintaining stability during a period of growing European influence. His mother was a consort of Circassian origin. Mohamed Bey was born in Tunis in 1811 and spent his early years in the royal palaces of Le Bardo and La Marsa. Raised alongside his royal relatives, he received a traditional princely education in Islamic studies, as well as military training and exposure to court politics. His upbringing during a time of early reforms prepared him for leadership and shaped his later efforts to preserve the authority of the state in the face of foreign pressures.

Muhammad II ibn al-Husayn
- Royal Family of Tunisia

== Modernising ruler ==
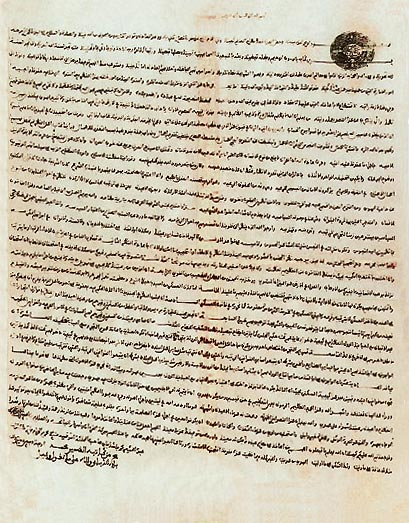
The Fundamental Pact,1857.

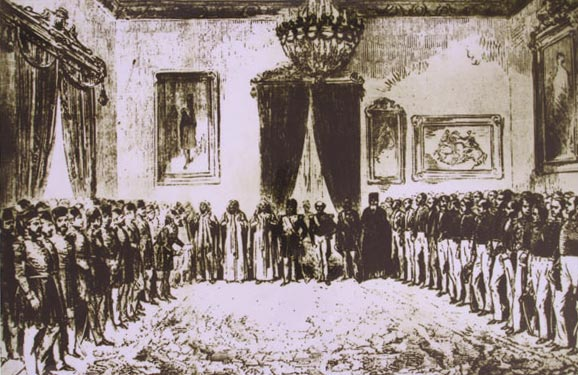
The proclamation of the Fundamental Pact in the Bardo Palace on 10 September 1857.

After his accession he proceeded with reforms, including, on 10 September 1857, the Fundamental Pact which recognised religious freedom and equality before the law for all inhabitants of the country, regardless of their religion. In a decree of 30 August 1858, he established the first modern municipal government for the city of Tunis.

He considerably extended and embellished the Dar al-Taj Palace in La Marsa, stripping the old

Mohamedia Palace favoured by his predecessor of building materials to do so.

He died after only four years on the throne and was buried in the Tourbet el Bey in the Medina of Tunis.

Preceded by Ahmed I Bey	Bey of Tunis; 1855–1859	Succeeded by Muhammad III as-Sadiq
