= Mustafa ibn Mahmud =

Bey of Tunis

Bey of Tunis
- Reign: 20 May 1835 – 10 October 1837
- Predecessor: Al-Husayn II ibn Mahmud
- Successor: Ahmad I ibn Mustafa
- Born: Mustafa ibn Mahmud Bey; August 1787; Tunis, Kingdom of Tunisia
- Died: 10 October 1837 (aged 50); La Goulette, Kingdom of Tunisia
- Burial: Tourbet el Bey, Tunis, Tunisia
- Spouse: Francesca Rosso di Sofia
- Issue: Ahmad I ibn Mustafa; Mouhammed Amin; Lalla Mahbouba Beya; Lalla Sassia; Lalla Fatima
- Dynasty: Husainides
- Father: Mahmud ibn Muhammad
- Religion: Islam

Mustafa I (1786–1837) (Arabic: مصطفى الأول), commonly known as Mustapha Bey, was the ninth leader of the Husainid Dynasty and the ruler of Tunisia from 1835 until his death in 1837.

Preceded by Al-Husayn II ibn Mahmud	Bey of Tunis; 1835–1837	Succeeded by Ahmad I ibn Mustafa
