= Uthman ibn Ali (bey of Tunis) =

Bey of Tunis (1763–1814)

Bey of Tunis
- Reign: 15 September 1814 – 20 December 1814
- Predecessor: Hammuda ibn Ali
- Successor: Mahmud ibn Muhammad
- Born: Uthman ibn Ali Bey; 27 May 1763; Le Bardo, Kingdom of Tunisia
- Died: 20 December 1814 (aged 51); Tunis, Kingdom of Tunisia
- Burial: Tourbet el Bey, Tunis, Tunisia
- Spouse: Lalla Amina Beya
- Issue: Saleh Bey; Ali Bey; Hussein Bey; Ahmed Bey
Names
- Othman Ben Ali II Bey
- Dynasty: Husainides
- Father: Ali II ibn Hussein
- Religion: Islam

Uthman ibn Ali (Arabic: عثمان الأول بن علي), commonly referred to as Osman Bey (Arabic: عصمان باي ; 27 May 1763 – 20 December 1814) was the sixth leader of the Husainid Dynasty and the ruler of Tunisia briefly in 1814.

Preceded by Hammuda ibn Ali	Bey of Tunis; 1814	Succeeded by Mahmud ibn Muhammad

== See also ==
- Youssef Saheb Ettabaa
