= Hammuda ibn Ali =

Bey of Tunis (1759–1814)

Bey of Tunis
- Reign: 1782 – 1814
- Predecessor: Ali II ibn Hussein
- Successor: Uthman ibn Ali
- Born: Hammouda Ben Ali I Bey; 9 December 1759; Le Bardo, Kingdom of Tunisia
- Died: 15 November 1814 (aged 54); Le Bardo, Kingdom of Tunisia
- Burial: Tourbet el Bey, Tunis, Tunisia
- Spouse: Baroudi
- Issue: Mouhammed Bey
Names
- Hammouda Ben Ali I Bey
- Dynasty: Husainides
- Father: Ali II ibn Hussein
- Religion: islam

Hammuda ibn Ali (Arabic: حمودة الأول بن علي), commonly referred to as Hammouda Bey (Arabic: حمودة باي ; 9 December 1759 – 15 September 1814) was the fifth leader of the Husainid dynasty and the ruler of Tunisia from 26 May 1782 until his death on 15 September 1814. He was the son of Ali II ibn Hussein. He was succeeded by his brother Uthman ibn Ali.

== See also ==
- Moustapha Khodja
- Venetian bombardments of the Beylik of Tunis (1784–88)
- Youssef Saheb Ettabaa
- Little Pacha Mosque

Preceded by Ali II ibn Hussein	Bey of Tunis; 1782–1814	Succeeded by Uthman ibn Ali
