= Guiga Lyes Ben Laroussi =

- Picture taken from Interpol website
- Born: 14 June 1969 (age 57); Le Bardo, Tunisia
- Occupation: Ex-marketing manager
- Status: At large
- Criminal charges: 16 charges including possessing cocaine and selling ecstasy
- Penalty: 24 years in jail and 20 strokes of the cane

Guiga Lyes Ben Laroussi (Note: According to Interpol website, Guiga is his surname.) (born on 14 June 1969, in Le Bardo, Tunisia) is an international fugitive wanted by the Singaporean government for drug trafficking.

== Background ==
Guiga was the marketing manager at Bobby Rubino's restaurant in Singapore. Central Narcotics Bureau officers had Guiga under surveillance for two months and spotted him several times meeting suspected drug users outside pubs in popular nightspot areas, such as Mohamed Sultan. In the first-ever raid of a cocaine syndicate ring in Singapore in October 2004, which resulted in the arrest of 23 members including wealthy locals and high-profile expatriates, Guiga was claimed by the police to be the link man of the ring. He was charged with 16 charges including possessing 25.2 grams (0.9 oz) of cocaine and selling ecstasy to Dutch businessman Petrus Van Wanrooij. Guiga's girlfriend Mariana Abdullah was charged with drug-related offence as well.

Guiga faced 24 years in jail and 20 strokes of the cane under a plea bargain arrangement he was considering. He failed to appear in court on February 23, 2005, when he was due to appear to give his plea over the charges. Judge F.G. Remedios issued a warrant for his arrest and said his bail fee of S$280,000 (US$170,000) had been forfeited. Since Guiga's passport had been impounded as part of bail conditions, it is unclear how he managed to flee the country. Guiga was subsequently listed by Interpol as a fugitive. A possible link to the Gambino crime family, who at the time was known to be laundering money through various Bobby Rubino locations, is one possible explanation of how Guiga was able to elude authorities.
