= Neptune Triumph and the House of Sorothus mosaic =

Roman mosaic discovered in Tunisia

Mosaic of the Triumph of Neptune and the House of Sorothus
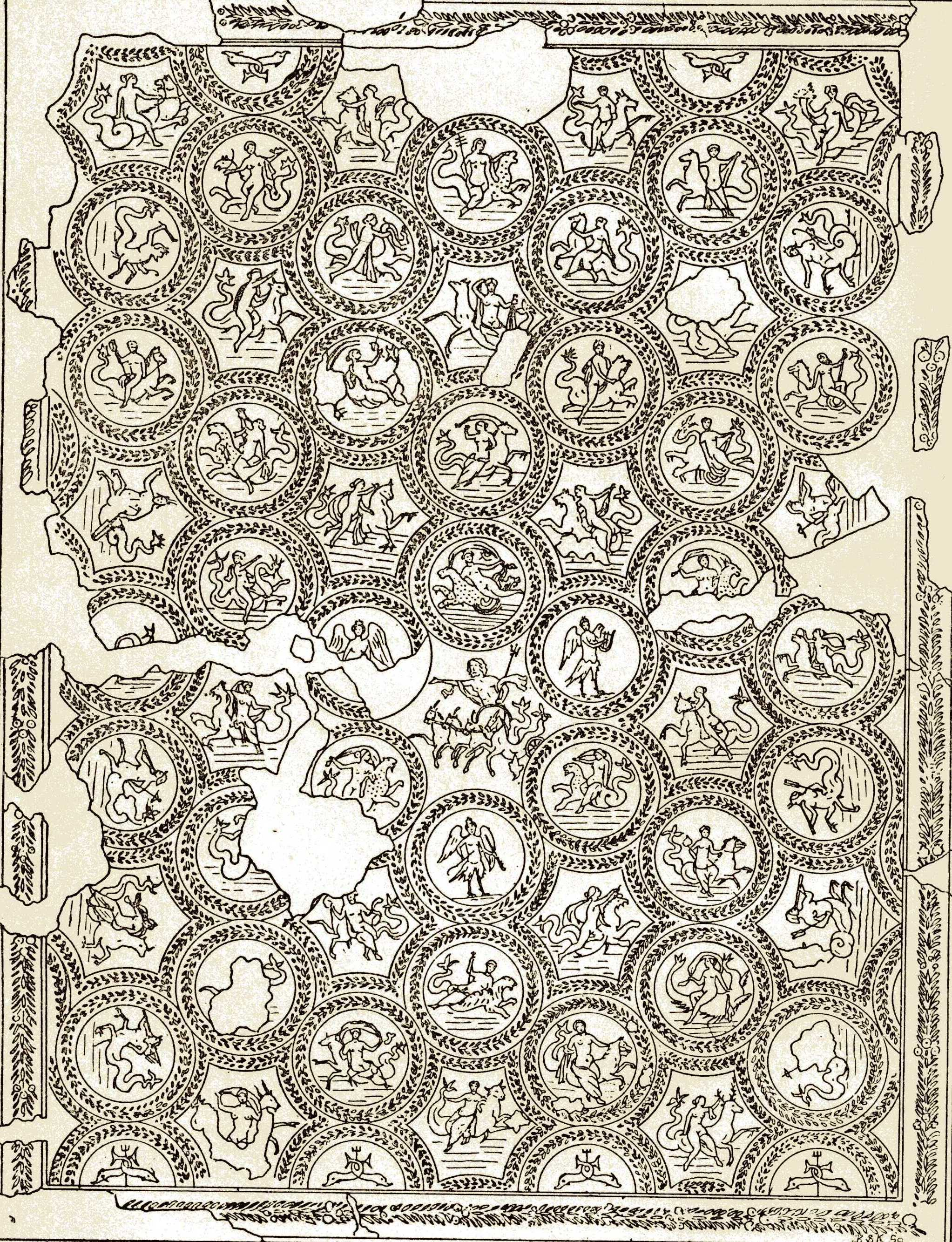
- Drawing of the mosaic in the Alaoui Museum Catalogue.
- Year: 1st century - 2nd century
- Dimensions: 13.14 cm × 10.25 cm (5.17 in × 4.04 in)
- Location: Conservation Musée national du Bardo, Sousse

The Neptune Triumph and the House of Sorothus mosaic, also known as the Neptune and Nereids mosaic or the Neptune Procession mosaic, is a Roman mosaic dating from the 1st or 2nd century, discovered in Tunisia at the end of the 19th century, in the House of Sorothus on the site of Sousse, the ancient Hadrumetus.

The Neptune mosaic is housed in the Bardo National Museum where its size and state of preservation make it one of the museum's masterpieces. When the museum was extended in early 2010, it was moved from the Sousse room, where it had previously been displayed on the floor, to a new space now displayed vertically.

The partially excavated site of the House of Sorothus has also yielded other mosaic works that provide valuable insights into the building's historical and social context; these artifacts are distributed between a room in the Sousse barracks, the Sousse Archaeological Museum and the Bardo National Museum. Some works were destroyed or damaged during the fighting of the Second World War, in particular the bombardment of the Sousse citadel by Allied forces in 1943. Fragments of works thought to have been lost were rediscovered during research carried out in the reserves by a Tunisian mosaic specialist in the 1980s, and some were able to be presented to the public again, notably after the restructuring of the Sousse archaeological museum in the 2010s.

== History and location ==
=== Discovery ===
Incidental discovery

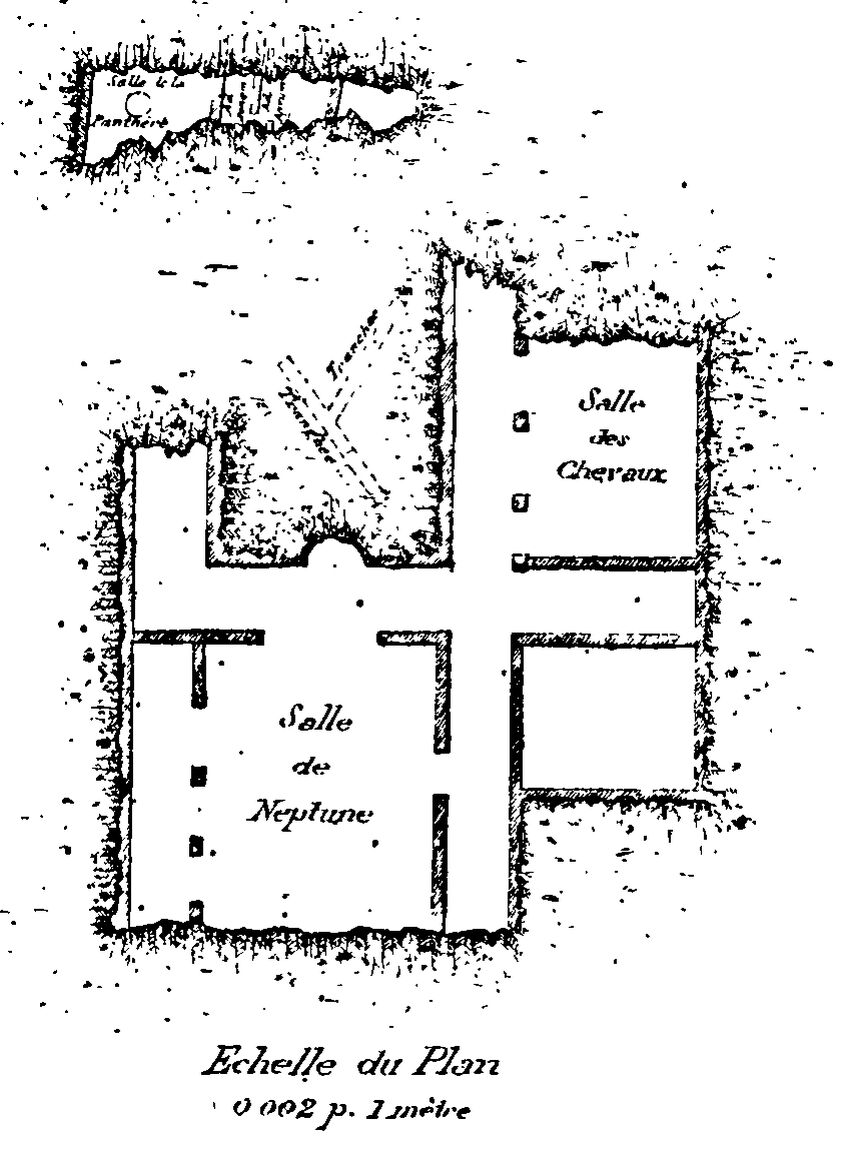
Sketch surveyed during excavations published by La Blanchère in 1888.

The mosaic, along with part of the house, was unearthed in 1886–1887 by soldiers led by General Bertrand, "commandant de la subdivision de Sousse", when they dug a sump in the regiment's garden occupied by an olive grove. No coins or inscriptions were found during the excavations carried out by the soldiers, who also uncovered Punic tombs. This was therefore a purely fortuitous discovery.

The mosaics in the House of Sorothus were all buried between 1 m and 1.80 m below ground level. Some walls were still almost 2 m high.

=== Gustave Hannezo's excavations ===
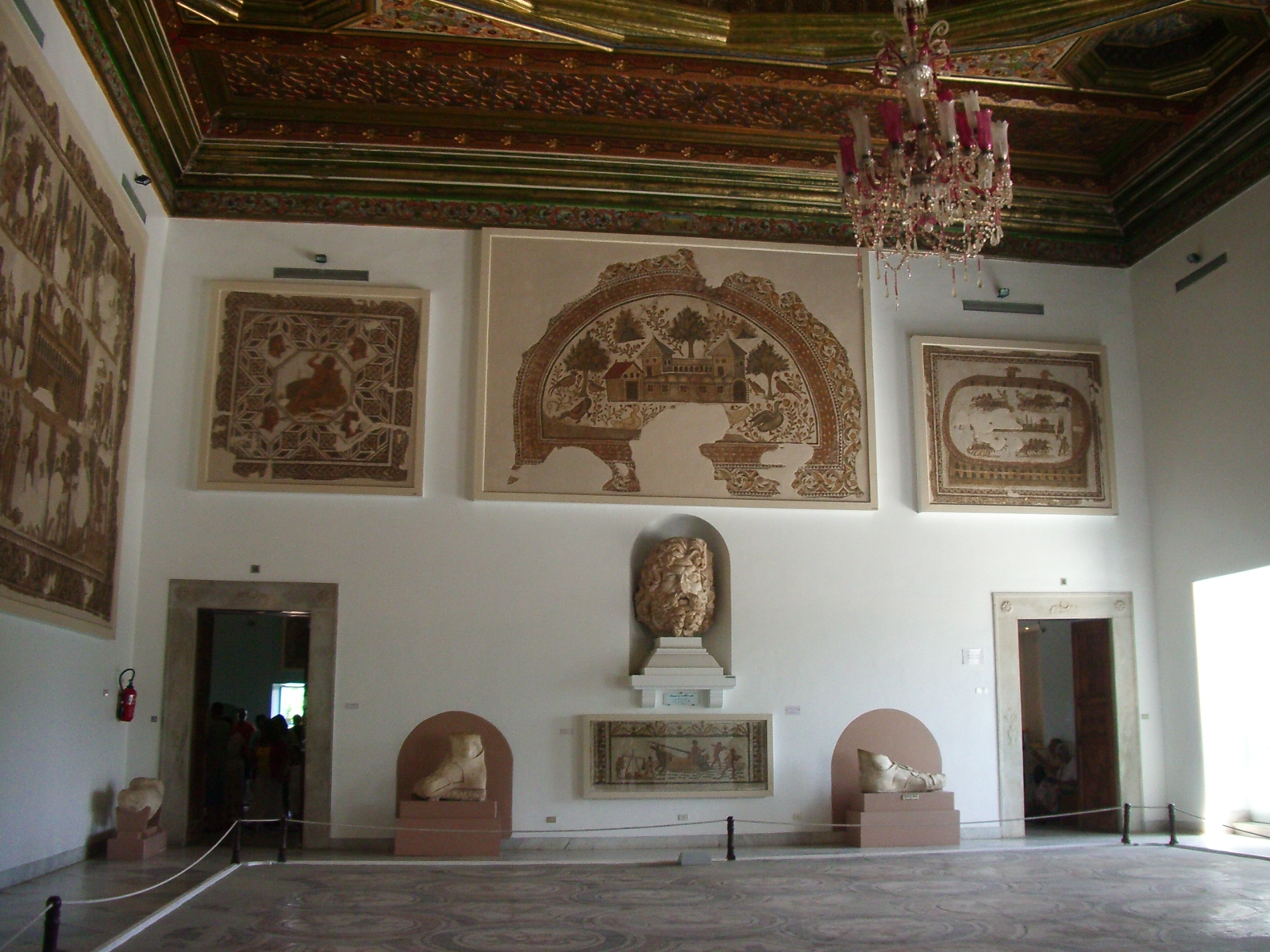
Former mosaic room at the Bardo Museum before its extensive restructuring, photograph taken in 2007.

The site was restored in 1888, and new excavations were carried out by Gustave Hannezo to further identify the House of Sorothus, uncovering other mosaics that remain in Sousse. Hannezo completed the excavation, then published articles on the mosaics of the house, as did Dr. Carton in the late 19th and early 20th centuries. He published a "rather clumsy" plan of the building after the excavation in 1896.

In the inner garden, Hannezo found fragments of lamps and ceramics as coins. The archaeological material is indeed "very small". Bronze and silver coins bear the effigies of Trajan, Hadrian, Antoninus the Pious, Faustina the Younger, Heliogabalus, Severus Alexander, Julia Mamaea, and Philip the Arab. A gold intaglio depicting Jupiter with a thunderbolt and sceptre and a Greek inscription were also uncovered.

Jean-Pierre Laporte and Henri Savagne pointed out in 2006 that "a large part of the walls [...] must still exist", as must many of the mosaic pavements, and that a stratigraphic study might still be possible for further on-site research.

=== Ancient history ===
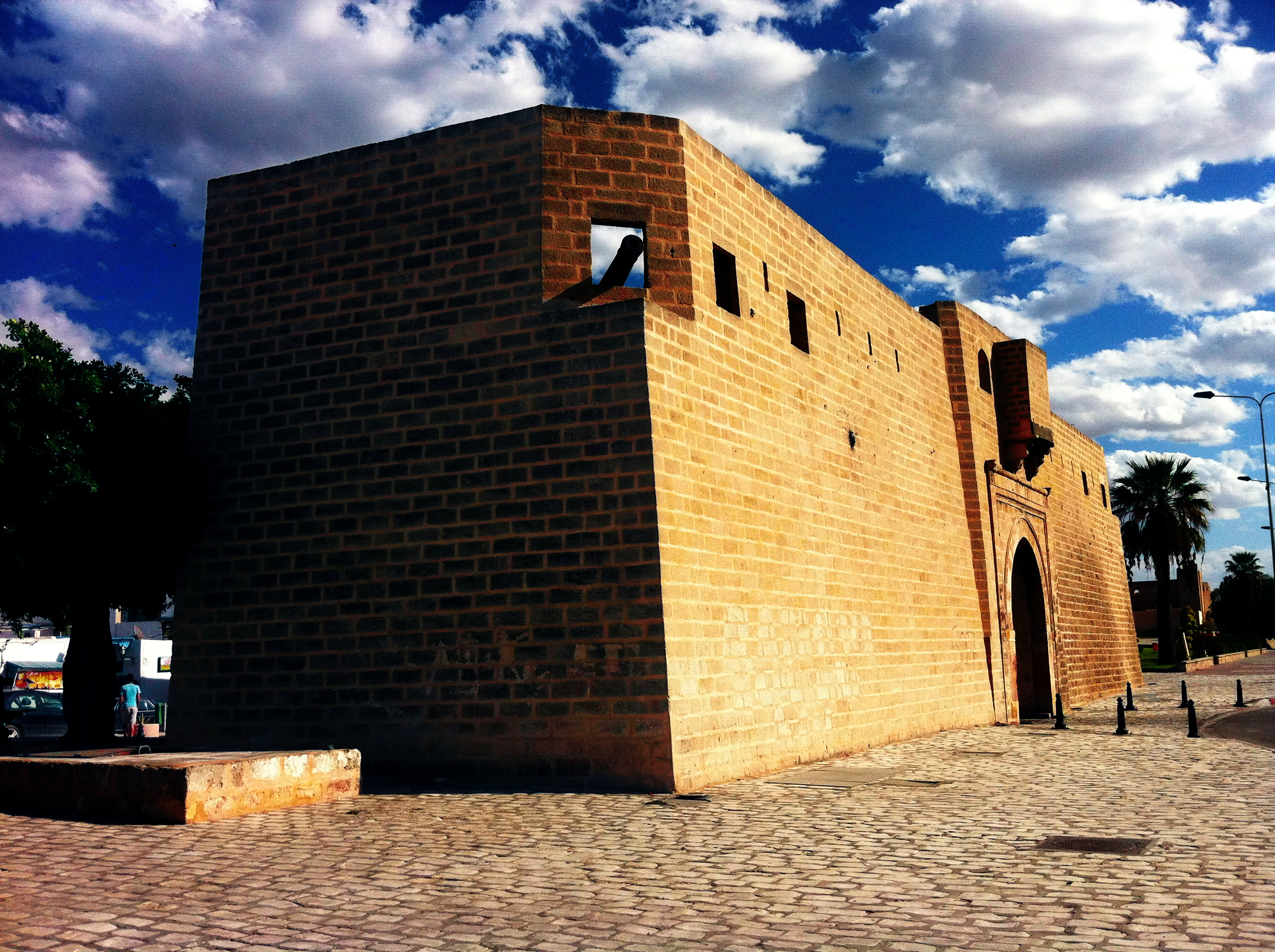
Bab El Gharbi.

The riflemen's barracks were located near the present-day Bab El Gharbi and Bab El Finga, two gateways to the medina of Sousse, an area occupied during the Roman Empire by wealthy houses that have yielded mosaics such as those of the Arsenal, Virgil and the rape of Augè by Heracles.

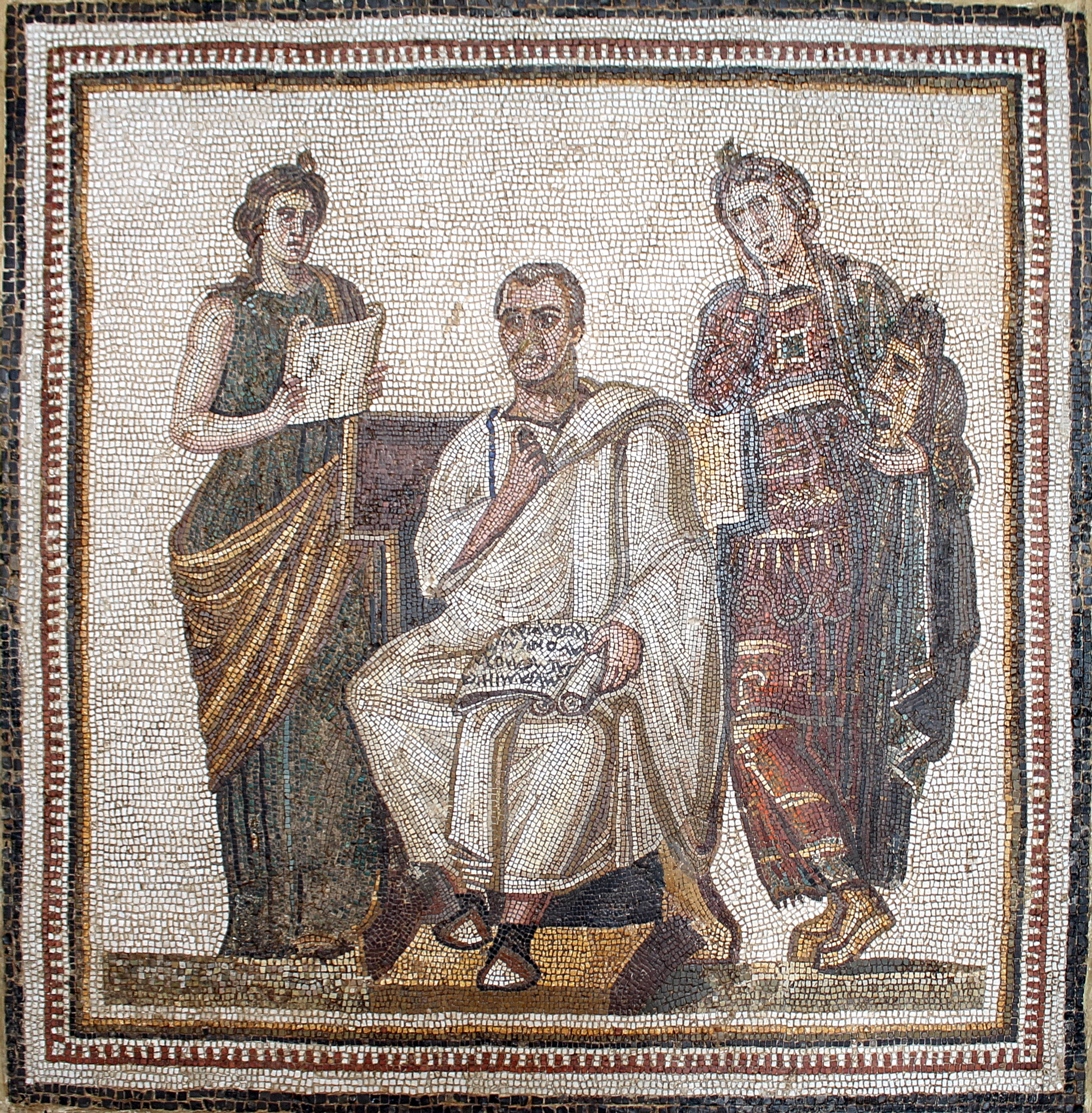
Mosaic of Virgil from the 2nd century, according to Mohamed Yacoub.

Mosaic depicting a man in a toga holding a scroll with writing, surrounded by two female figures, one holding a scroll and the other a theatrical mask.

Virgil mosaic dated to the 2nd century by Mohamed Yacoub.

The dating of the Neptune mosaic has varied in historiography. René du Coudray de La Blanchère dates the building after the Byzantine period, with the evacuation at the time of the Muslim conquest of the Maghreb. According to Mohamed Yacoub, it dates from the end of the 1st century or the 2nd century, more precisely from the second half of the 1st century or the beginning of the following century. It pre-dates 161–169, the reign of Lucius Aurelius Verus, the emperor who replaced the palm tree with a modius filled with gold coins as a symbol of victory. It was found in the œcus of a rich shipowner's or horse breeder's residence. The house also yielded a mosaic depicting the owner's estate and his horses and another depicting a panther.

The residence was abandoned before the building collapsed and was then covered by landslides. The site was later reused by a building, of which two rooms to the north and west have been reported, and also by late Roman burials. It was eventually converted into an olive grove. The mosaics were damaged by "the settling [of] backfill since antiquity" and the roots of olive trees.

=== Conservation issues ===
The works found in the house of Sorothus are distributed between different conservation sites. The Neptune Triumph mosaic is one of the main pieces on display at the Musée national du Bardo.

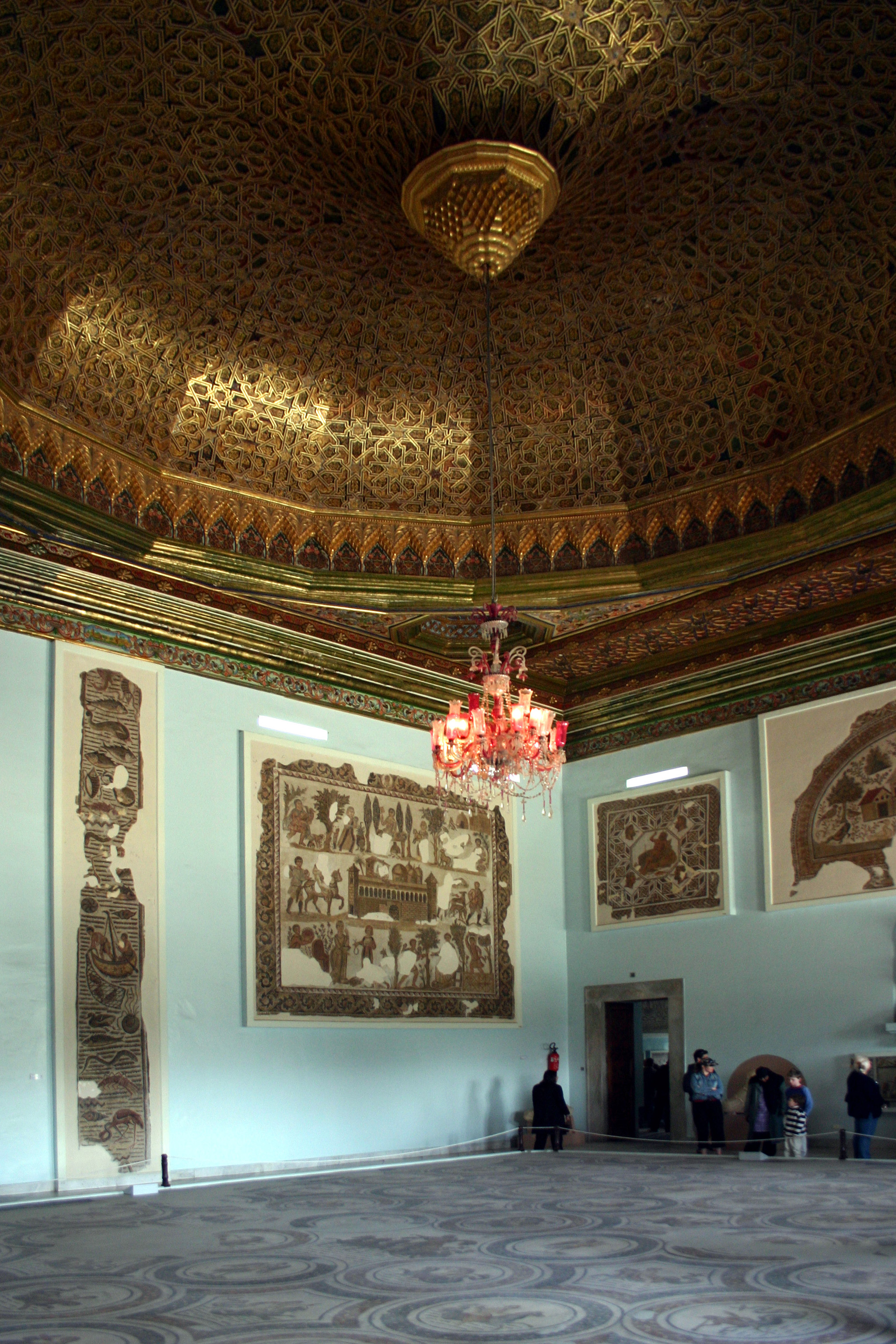
View of the Sousse hall in the early 2000s, with the Neptune mosaic on the floor.

==== Works conserved at the Musée national du Bardo ====
View of a palace room with a rich gilded ceiling and a large chandelier, featuring mosaics and visitors in the background.

View of the Sousse room in the early 2000s, with the Neptune mosaic on the floor.

René du Coudray de La Blanchère had the large mosaic of Neptune assigned to the brand-new Musée Alaoui, the future Musée du Bardo, which was carefully transported in several crates and then loaded onto a French cruiser, the D'Estrées. The dismantling, which began on March 7, 1887, preceded the loading onto the ship, which was completed on June 28. The surface area of the mosaic-covered room and the journey involved made removal and transport difficult. Each medallion was removed in turn, and slabs were made up. The crates use a Decauville railway line to reach the port and La Goulette. The set reaches Le Bardo by train. The mosaic is extensively restored prior to its exhibition, as is another work, the panther.

Once restored, the Neptune Triumph mosaic was installed by René du Coudray de La Blanchère in "the largest room in the Bardo".

==== Works entrusted to the Sousse Tirailleurs Museum and consequences of the 1943 bombardment ====
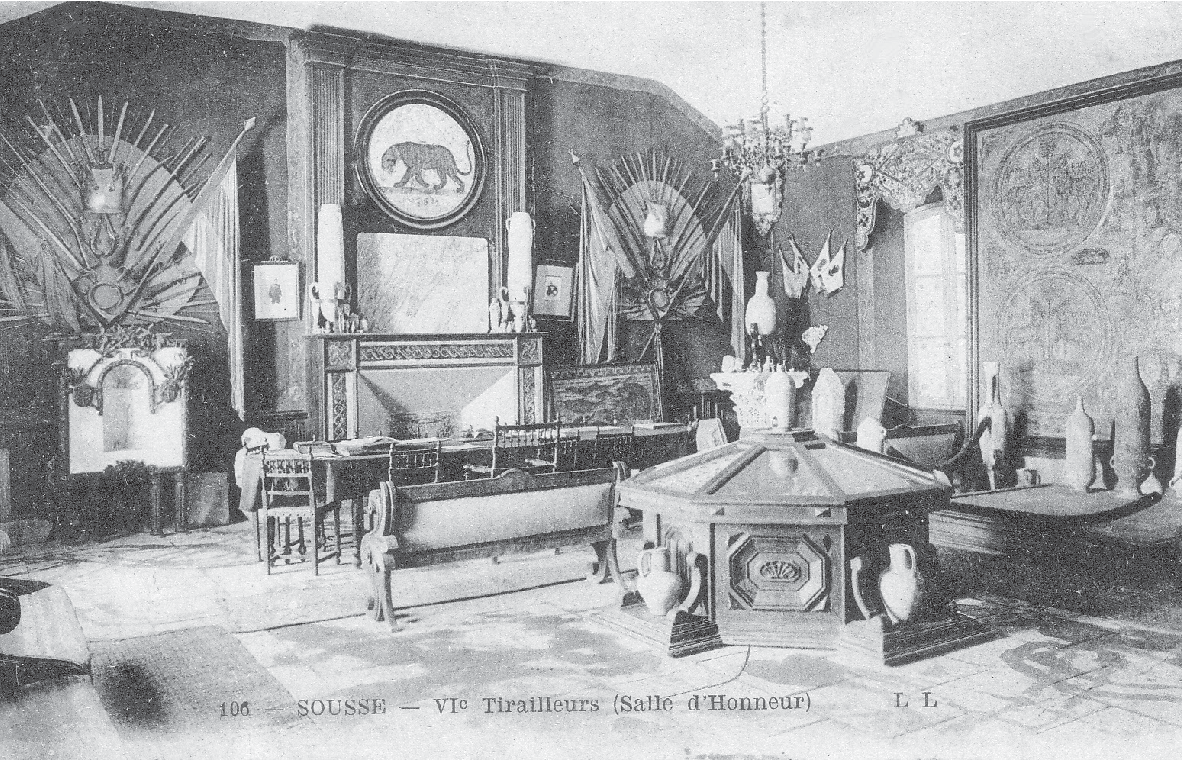
Antique postcard of the hall of honor of the 4th Tunisian Rifle Regiment, with the panther mosaic on the left and the stud mosaic from the Sorothus house on the right.

The hall of honor of the 4th regiment of Tunisian riflemen, in the kasbah of Sousse, was granted the right to keep the mosaic of a panther and that of the Sorothus horses by ministerial decree of January 29, 1887. The space was then a "sort of museum" containing, in addition to antique works, weapons and portraits of soldiers.

The regiment's hall of honor was destroyed in 1943 by American bombing raids on the town of Sousse: statuettes and a mosaic of the Seasons were lost, and only a few fragments of the Sorothus stud mosaic escaped the disaster, although they remained lost for a long time.

==== Recent history: from oblivion to rediscovery ====
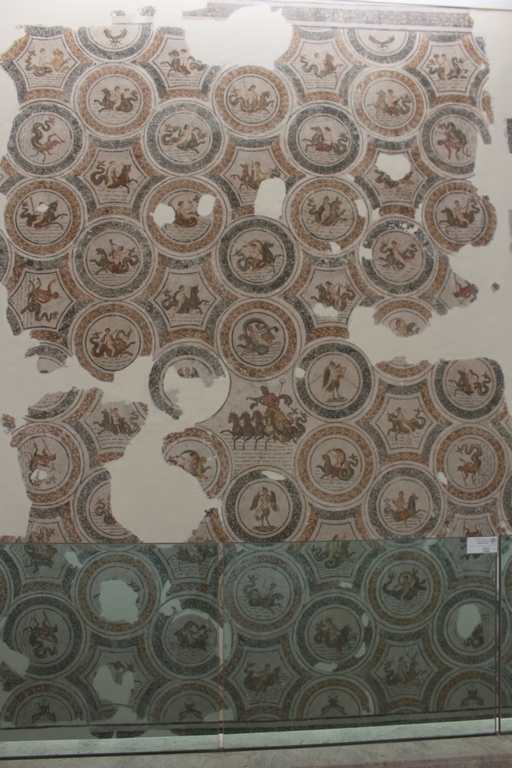
General view of the mosaic in its new presentation following the renovation of the museum.

Fragments sent to the Bardo Museum after the 1943 disaster were soon forgotten.

The panther mosaic, for its part, was deposited at an unknown time at the Bizerte Admiralty, and sent to France at an unknown date to join the collections of the Musée National de la Marine in Paris (inventory number 470A34). The medallion was then deposited with the Musée Napoléonien d'Antibes in 1963, and only recovered and identified in 1998. The work is now in a "mediocre" state of conservation.

In the 1980s, Mongi Ennaïfer found an element of the Winning Horses mosaic and eleven pieces of the Sorothus Stud mosaic at the Bardo Museum. After 2004, Taher Ghalia, Director of the Bardo National Museum, began to search for the fragments preserved there. A presentation in the Sousse archaeological museum was then desired. The fragments of the Sorothus stud mosaic were restored and installed in the Sousse museum at the beginning of the 21st century, during the extensive restructuring of this cultural institution.

Hardly visible in the room of the palace where it was exhibited on the floor, the Salle des Fêtes, then known as the Salle de Sousse, the Neptune mosaic was relocated during the rehabilitation and extension of the Bardo Museum in the 2010s.

== Description ==
=== Description of the house and mosaics found other than the Neptune mosaic ===
==== House ====
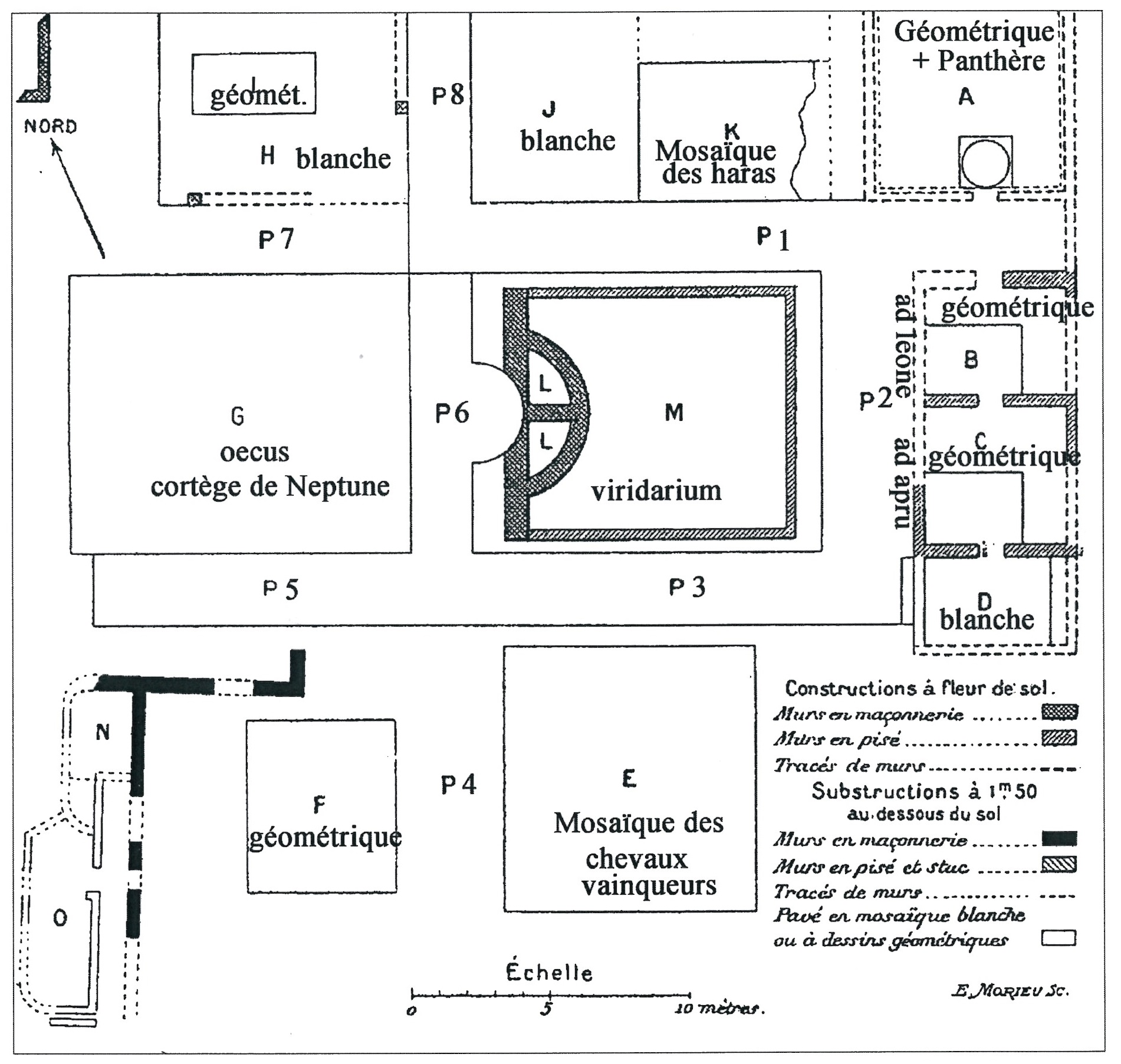
Plan of the Sorothus house after Gustave Hannezo's excavations, engraving by E. Morieu.

The layout of the Sorothus house is classic if we compare it with those known in Roman Africa.

The house is organized around a garden or viridarium, with a peristyle opening onto an œcus. When Gustave Hannezo excavated the area known as the viridarium, he uncovered elements of Misma shell sandstone and stuccoed limestone columns. These elements may have come from the destruction of the peristyle. Two basins were present in the viridarium. Excavations in the garden revealed a pottery drain pipe.

Rubble stone pillars formed the openings to the rooms overlooking the porticoes. A semicircular apse was present in the garden. The excavator assumes that the 0.50 m-wide walls were made of "mud and rubble from demolition work" and that the house had only one level. The upper parts of the walls were built of "not very resistant" adobe.

The walls were decorated with paintings, including geometric designs and "real paintings". The entire surface of the house was decorated with mosaics. One portico had lost its mosaics when it was rediscovered.

The peristyle gave access to the rooms, including the œcus and two rooms decorated with mosaics of horses, the stud mosaic, and the winning horse mosaic. The Neptune mosaic room also featured frescoes of dolphins. Threshold mosaics in the peristyle featured inscriptions, Ad leone[m] ("At the lion's house") and Ad apru[m] ("At the wild boar's house"); these rooms may have been bedrooms.

Animals must have been painted on the walls. The mosaic in the lion's room featured the location of a bed. The boar room had the inscription ad apru[m] in front of the entrance. The animals may have been chosen because they were present in games that the owner might have been fond of. The panther, lion, and boar rooms were decorated with mosaics featuring black and white geometric motifs. Opposite the entrance to the Neptune room, an apse featured a polychrome fan-shaped mosaic. The panther room featured brightly painted plasterwork. This room may have been called "Chez la panthère" or "Chez le lion ".

The corridors, over 3 m wide, were mosaic-painted with twists around the edges. The exedra facing the oecus featured a polychrome mosaic. The œcus, a large room providing access to the peristyle, was "wide open to the outside" and had nine thresholds on three sides.

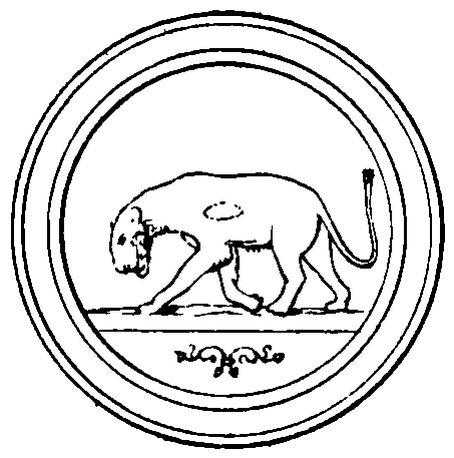
The panther medallion published in 1888.

==== Panther medallion ====
The panther mosaic, "opposite the entrance door", measures 1.30 m in diameter, but was found mutilated. The tame, walking animal wears a collar. The color rendering of the animal's coat produces "a striking effect", according to René du Coudray de La Blanchère. The representation of the animal is remarkable, inspired by a real animal, but the state of conservation is "mediocre". According to Jean-Pierre Laporte, the plant motifs in the medallion, two scrolls ending in ivy leaves, are a reference to the sodality of the Taurisci. The motif is also present on a threshold, on the horse mosaic and a medallion in the Neptune mosaic, featuring an ichthyosaur. According to Louis Foucher, this is a sign with prophylactic value. The mosaic also has a Dionysian meaning, the ivy motif often accompanying the divinity.

The panther medallion is surrounded by 0.29 m squares with Solomon's knots. The room was also brightly painted and its floor covered with black and white geometric mosaics.

==== Mosaic of stud farms ====
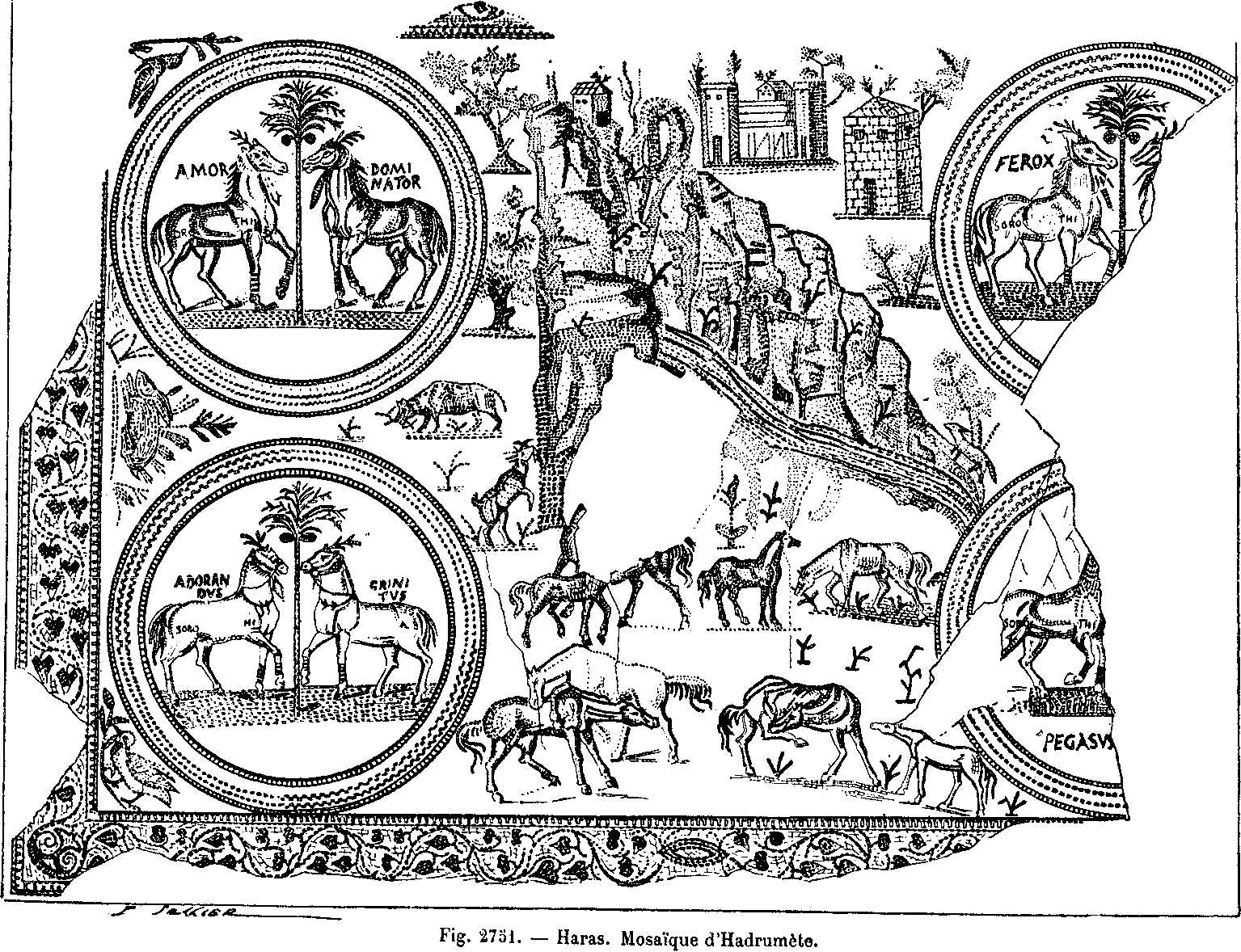
Engraving of the Sorothus stud mosaic in the Dictionnaire des Antiquités grecques et romaines by Daremberg and Saglio.

The stud farm mosaic measured 4.10 m by 3.40 m when first discovered. The right-hand side was then amputated. Presumed lost in the fighting of the Second World War, it is now preserved in the Bardo Museum and the Sousse Museum.

Four pairs of "Arab" horses are set in medallions at the corners.

The mosaic features a plant border and four medallions with horses and in the middle a landscape scene consisting of a plain with a river and free-roaming horses, a villa with another building surrounded by animals (cow, goat, hare, birds), an eroded mountain landscape with a building and a stream. The villa features columns on its façade and two square towers. Deer horns are placed on the skylight in a "presumably prophylactic" sense. The building is semicircular and the towers have terraced roofs. The building belongs to a type of villa rustica known from archaeology and iconography from the 1st to the 2nd century; the representation on the stud mosaic shows a building that is probably fairly faithful to the character's villa.

In the foreground, Paul Gauckler evokes a mare farm, echoed by Mohamed Yacoub. The mosaic evokes the "confines of wild, uninhabited nature" and the "humanized countryside". A figure plays the syrinx. Yacoub evokes "the influence of idyllic and fanciful landscapes" and the influence of Alexandrian art, even if the landscape resembles those of the Tunisian steppe. The buildings are also plausible.

Horses compete on either side of the symbol of victory, the medallions being "artificially embedded" in the mosaic, according to Yacoub. This representation is a first, as the horses shown existed. The mosaicist has created a kind of "advertising billboard" for the [...] Sorothus stud farms", a "means of propaganda". According to Katherine Dunbabin, Louis Foucher, and Jean-Pierre Laporte, the mosaic represents the Sorothus stud farms and is not just a convention. The mosaic aims to reproduce reality.

Each of the medallions features two horses ready for the race, one leg raised, the head carrying a palm, with a collar or bridle, and separated by a date palm with fruit. Six of the horse's names are known, the last two being in the lacunar part of the mosaic: Amor and Dominator, Adorandus and Crinitus, Ferox and Pegasus. The horses are at rest. Some bear the inscription Sorothi on their rumps, others a stable mark, "four vertical trapezoids of decreasing size", perhaps an evocation of a Numidian peak.

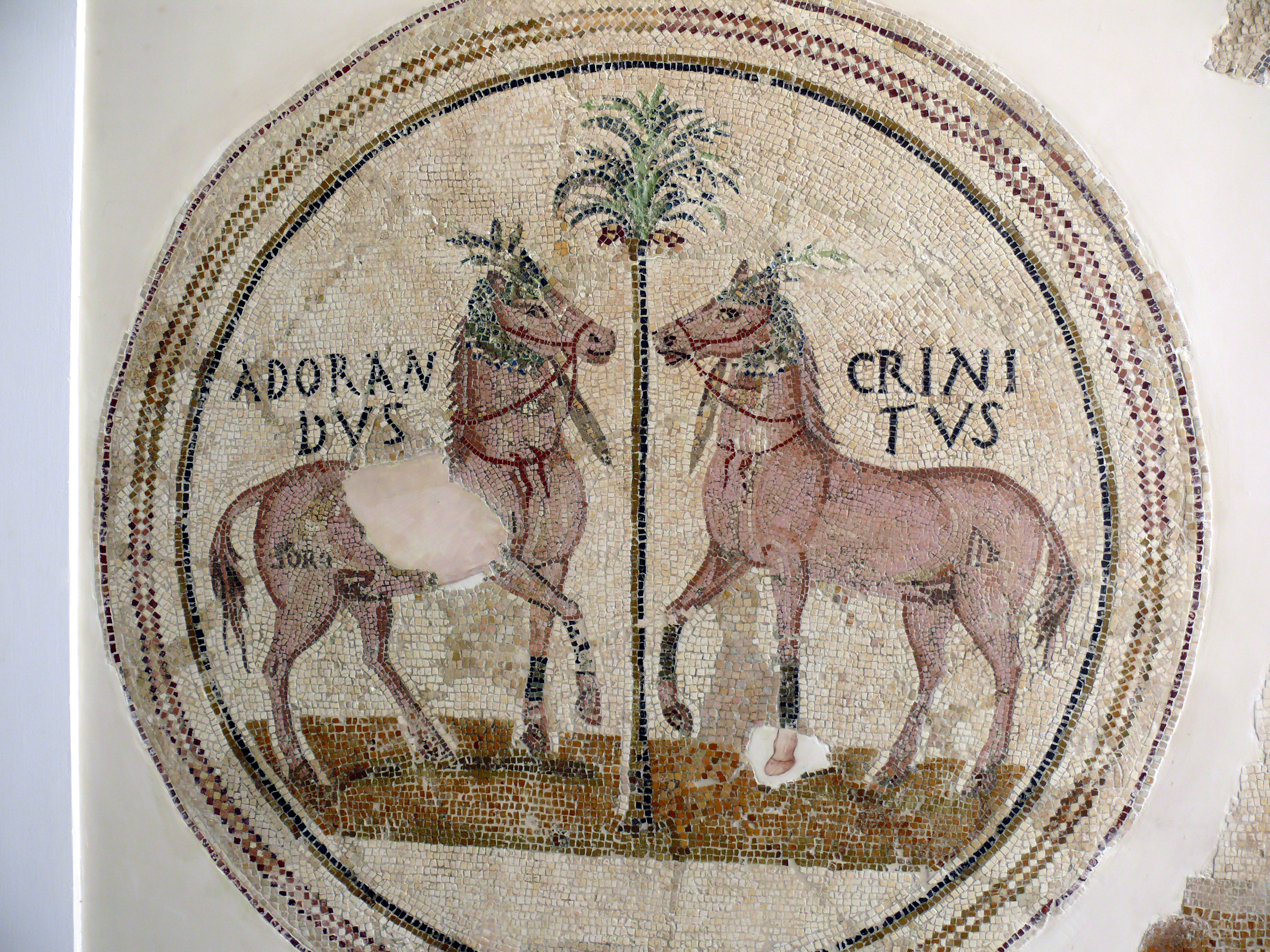
Mosaic of the horses Adorantus and Crinitus, Sousse archaeological museum.

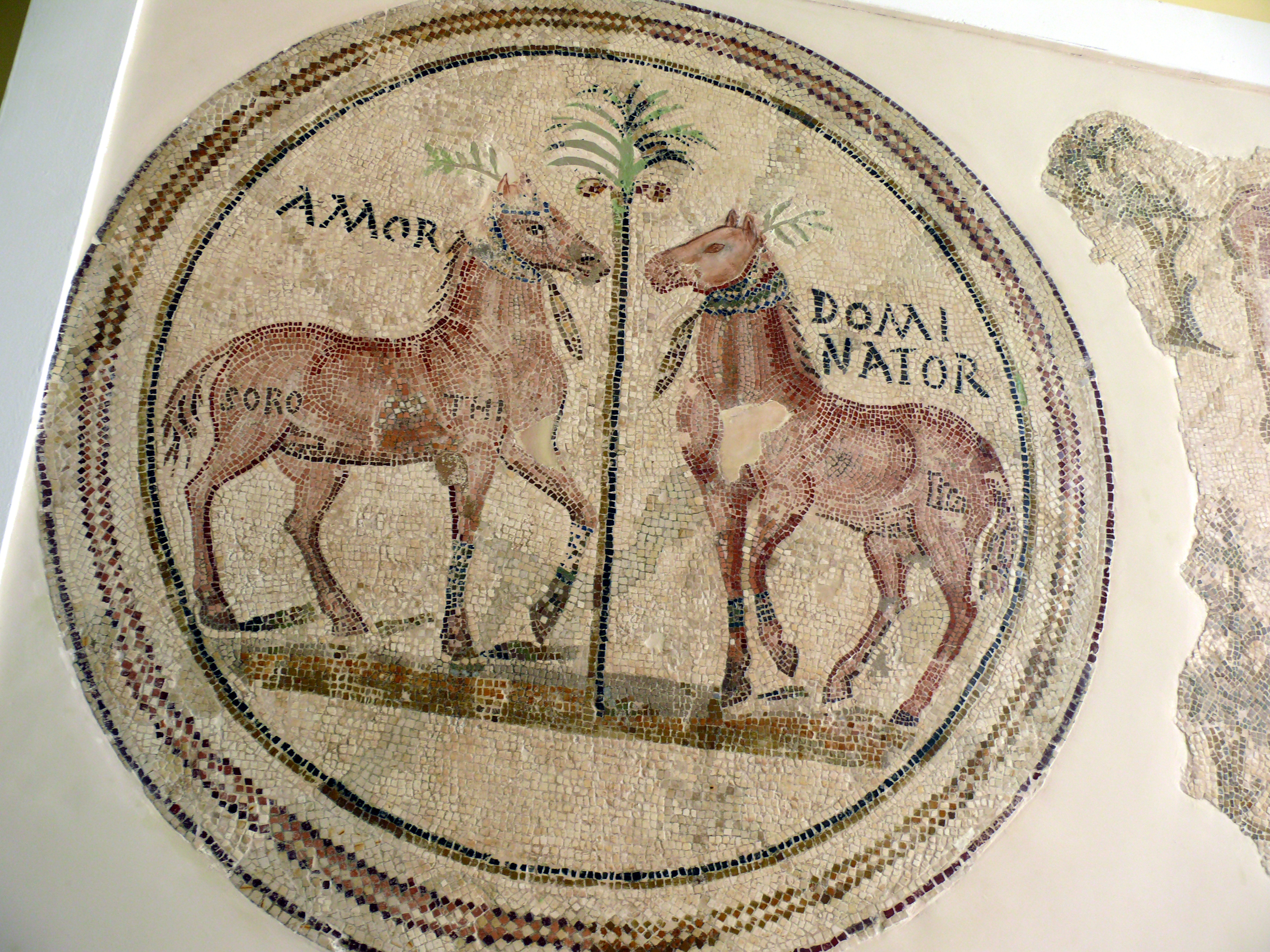
Mosaic of the Amor and Dominator horses, Sousse archaeological museum.

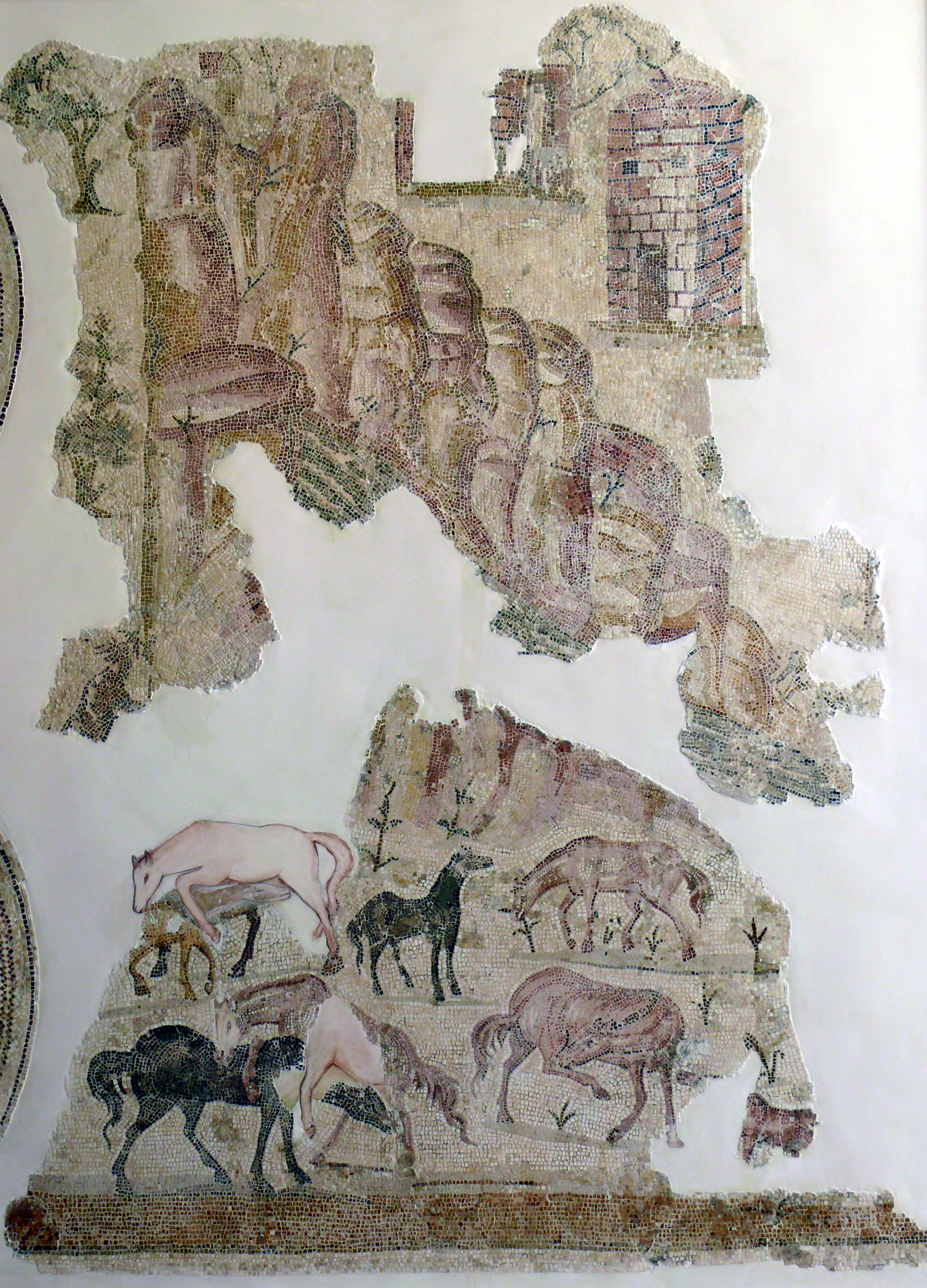
Mosaic from the Sorothus estate, Sousse archaeological museum.

==== Mosaic of winning horses ====
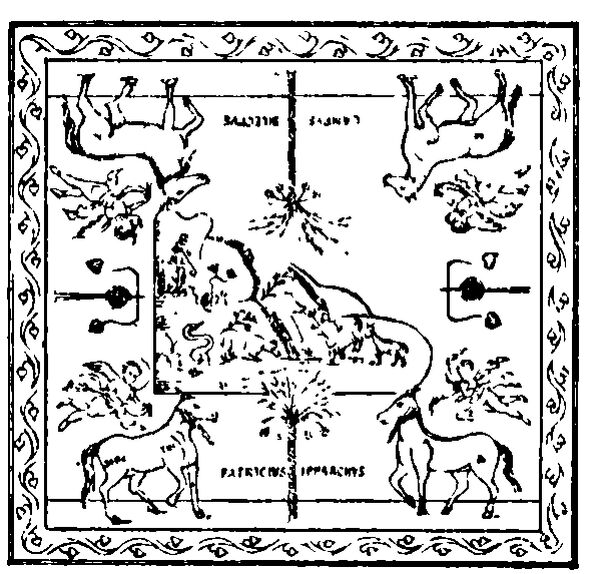
Mosaic of confronted horses from the House of Sorothus on an 1880s publication.

The horse mosaic measures around 2 m (1.89 m by 1.80 m) and the tesserae are very small, which means that the figurative details are very precise. An ivy frame surrounds the painting which features four horses "facing each other two by two". Posts and palm trees "loaded with bunches" are also present. The fascina posts are trophies separating the Amours.

The horses are red and white, and some bear inscriptions or symbols. Linked by the color of their coats, they carry a bouquet and a collar with an acorn. Above each horse is a naked, winged genie; each genie is represented differently.

Jean-Pierre Laporte considers that the horses are surmounted by "a flying Love". Palms, "symbols of victory", are present. Flying loves crown the horses with laurels. Shafts, "cross-shaped poles", separate the facing horses.

On either side of the palms are inscriptions, Patricius-Ipparchus and Campus-Dilectus, the names of the four horses. As on the other mosaic, the horses bear the inscription "SOROTHI" and the stable mark. The word Sorothi is in the genitive, indicating that the animals belong to the name Sorothus.

According to Laporte, the mosaic bears the symbol of the sodality of the Taurisci, while René du Coudray de La Blanchère considers the symbol to represent circus poles, and Louis Foucher sees it as trophies. The symbol also appeared in the entrance to the room, but simplified, as did the stable symbol.

The center of the composition is occupied by an "idyllic scene" with rocks, waterfalls, and animals. A figure with a crook and playing the syrinx sits on the rock. The central scene was lost after 1943 and was "rather poorly connected to the rest of the painting": a rock bearing plants, a waterfall, and various animals (goat, cow, deer, snake, snail). The figure is a shepherd. However, fragments were found by Mongi Ennaïfer in the early 1980s at the Bardo National Museum.

The motif was contained in "a polygonal polychrome pattern". René du Coudray de La Blanchère emphasizes the quality of the mosaic containing this work, polychrome and featuring a combination of geometric motifs: octagons, squares, lozenges, and triangles. He refers to an unfulfilled wish to preserve the mosaic in situ, "by building a room over it".

=== Mosaic of Neptune's triumph ===
==== General description ====
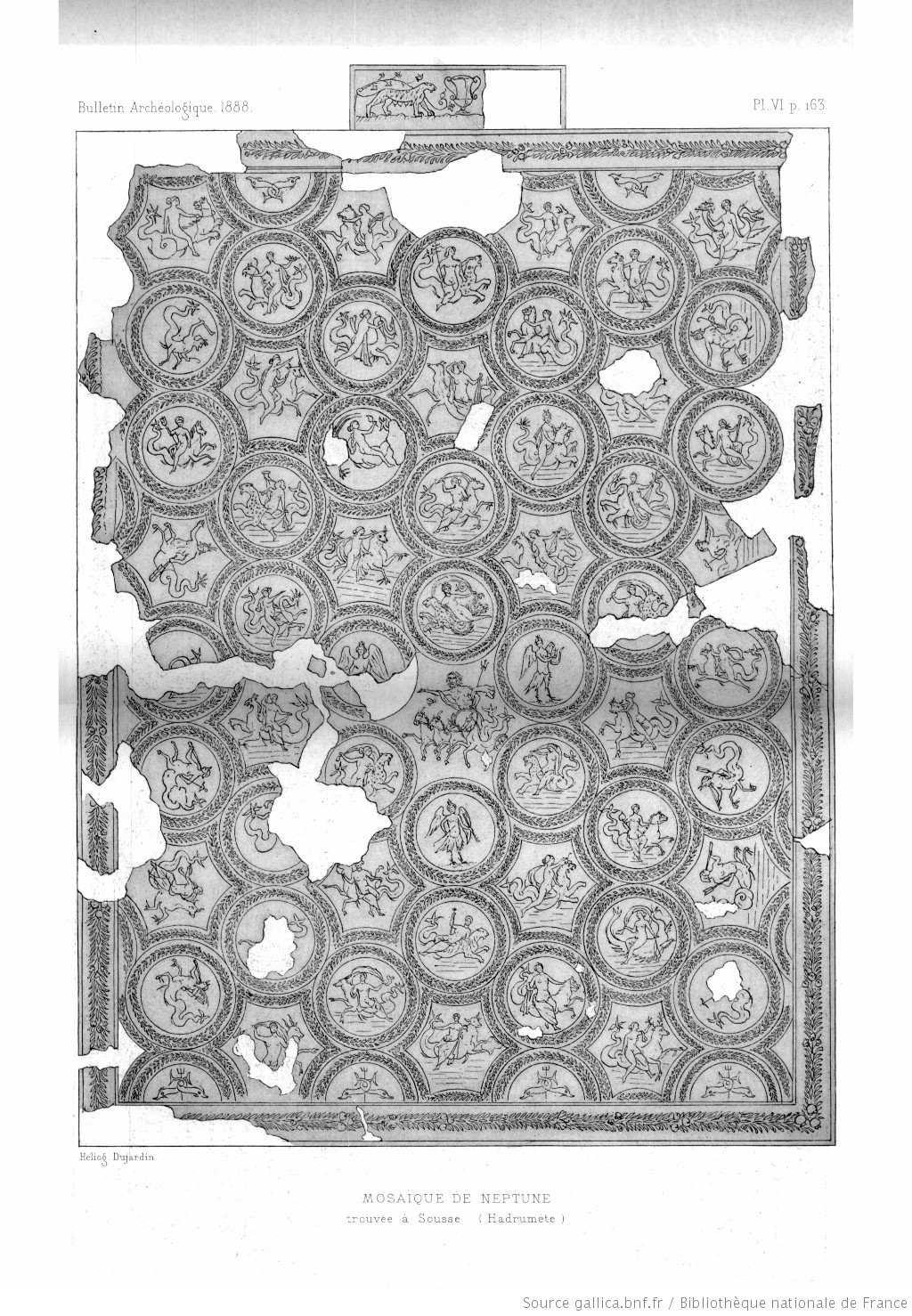
General view of the published mosaic with the direction of thresholdH 54 reversed.

The mosaic of Neptune's triumph, measuring 134.68 m^{2}, is not in very good condition, "with large, irreparable wounds [...] in the threshold, in the frame, in the composition itself". "Virtually intact" according to René du Coudray de La Blanchère, the mosaic was subsequently repaired.

The main threshold, measuring 2.95 m by 0.75 m, features a tiger and a tigress separated by a vase; vine scrolls were originally present, but the tiger had disappeared before excavation. The pampre runs from the crater to the edge of the threshold mosaic. The other sills feature a swastika.

The mosaic tesserae are made of marble and glass, and some are "decomposed", with a large number of color shades.

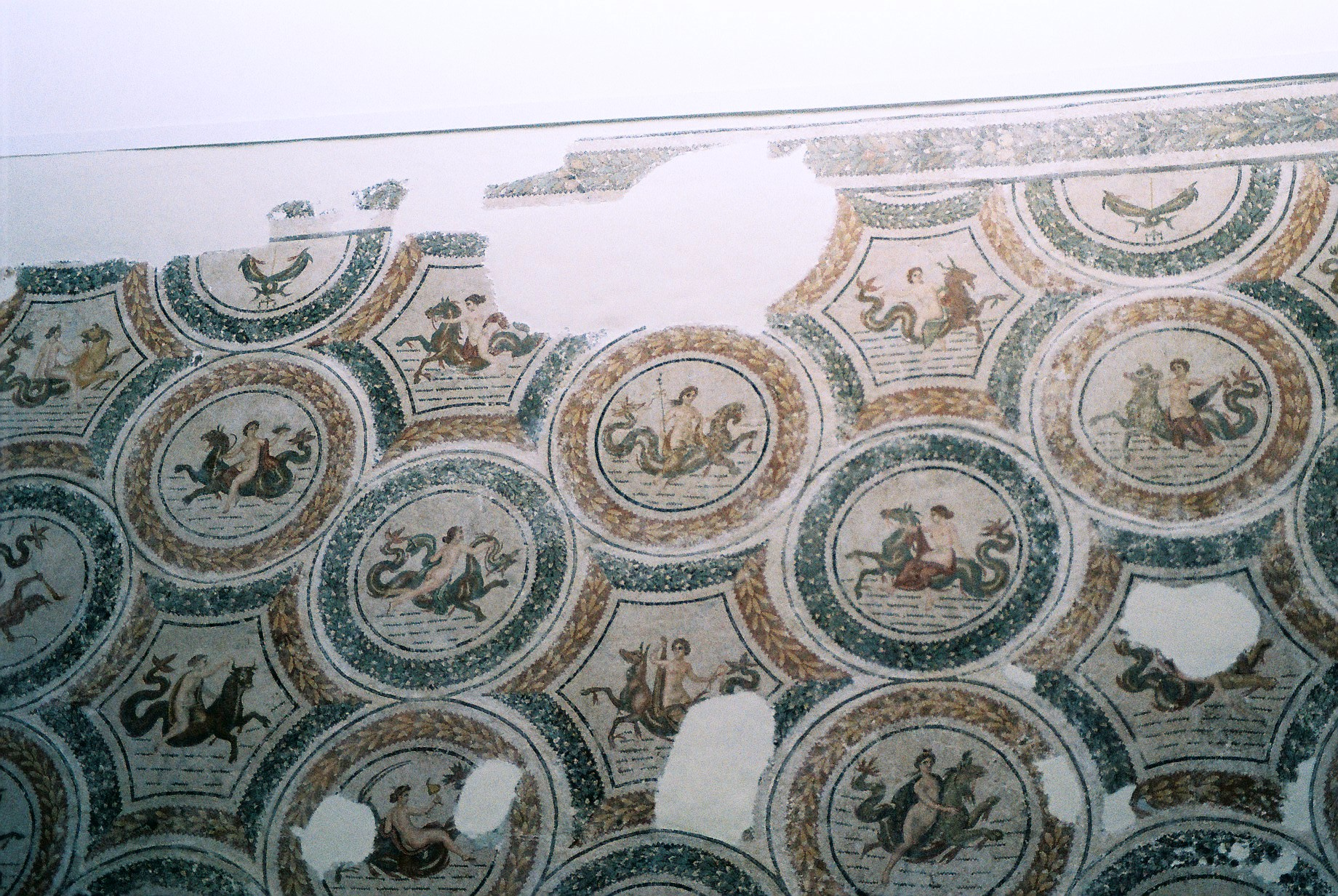
View of medallions and part of the mosaic border, with dolphin medallions.

A wide plant border features olive and laurel leaves, fruit, and flowers. At the entrance and exit of the room is a motif featuring two dolphins wrapped around a trident.

The huge œcus pavement features 56 medallions, 35 circular, and 21 concave hexagonal. Each medallion is framed by a border. Circular or hexagonal medallions are separated from one another by laurel garlands. Each medallion stands alone, but the mosaic forms "a single picture".

All but ten of the figures follow an east–west axis, to be visible from the householder's seat. The last ten face outwards or towards the other beds in the room.

Neptune's procession is neither in the center of the mosaic nor in a hexagonal medallion; it has no inner border, which increases the space devoted to the scene, which is "very lively" and colorful.

The geometric center of the composition is occupied by a round medallion, possibly depicting Amphitrite. Two other medallions surrounding Neptune depict Nereids on sea animals and mermaids accompanied by musical instruments. These arrangements are "the only trace of symmetry in the composition". The medallions surrounding Neptune feature alternating Nereids and mermaids: the Nereids ride sea panthers and, among the mermaids with "gallinaceous legs", two have instruments, a flute and a lyre, and the last must be singing. The number of mermaids is "by mythology", and they are equipped with wings and feathers.

=== Neptune's procession ===
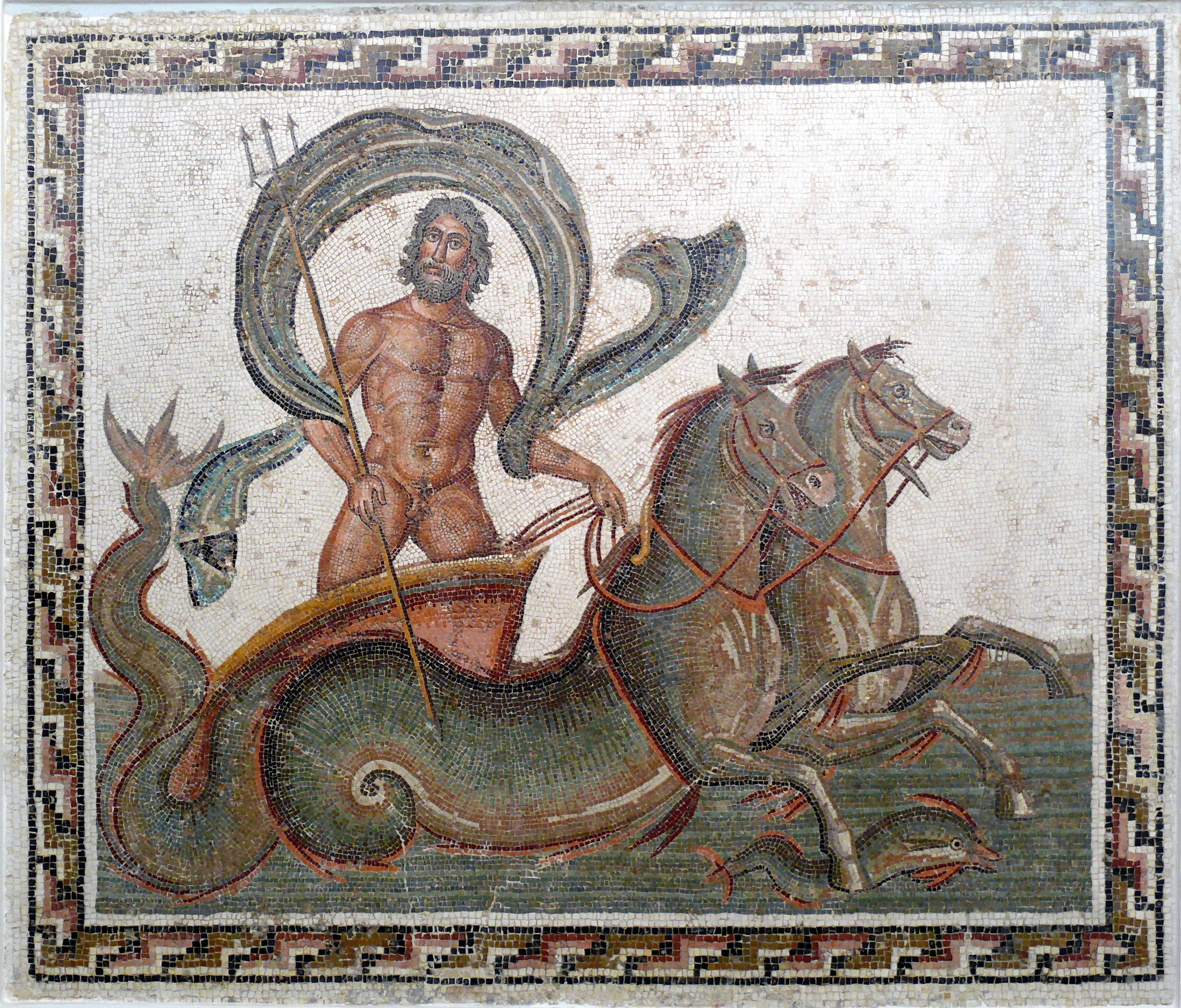
Another Neptune Triumph mosaic in the Sousse archaeological museum, discovered in 1904, mid-second century.

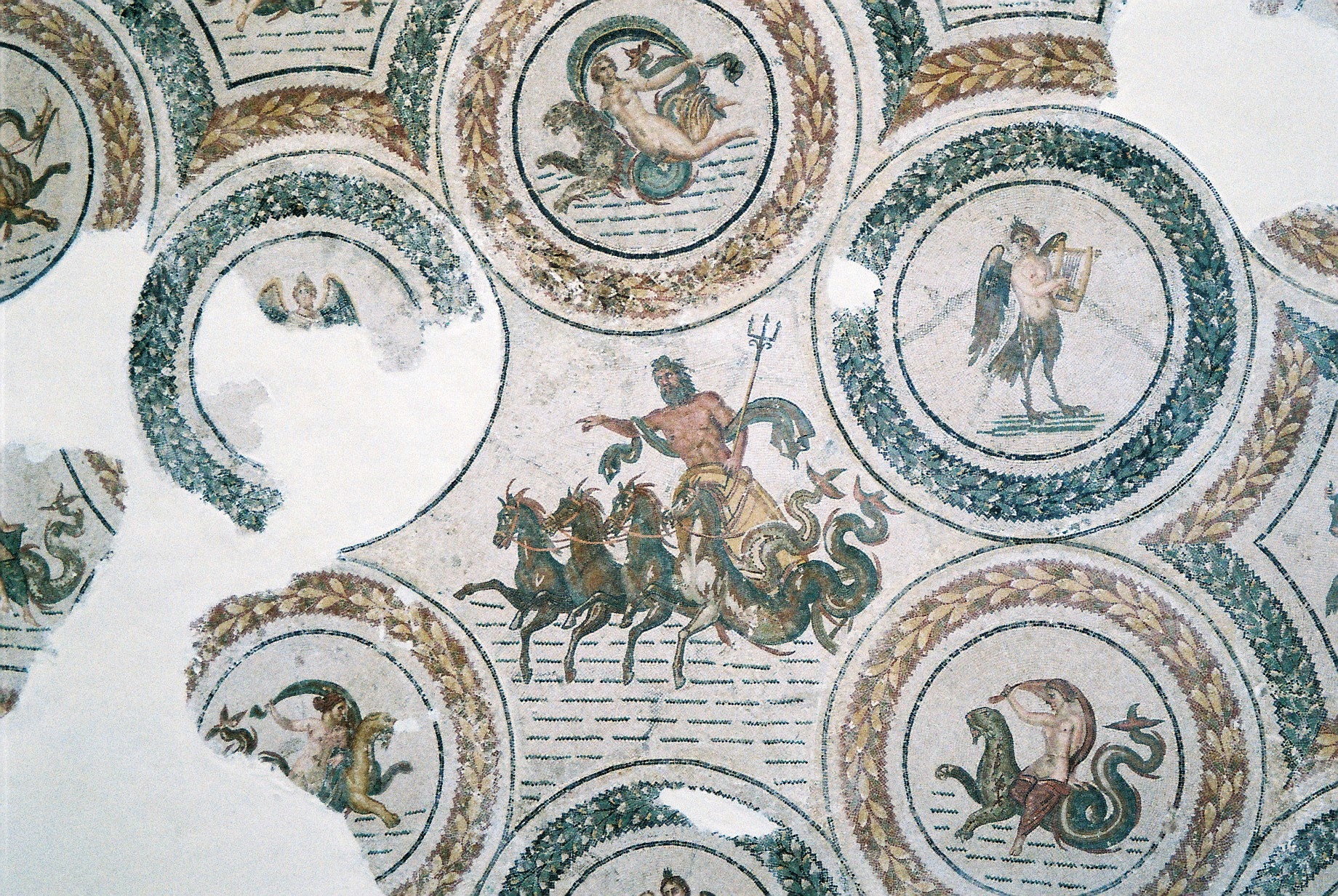
View of the central medallion with Neptune's triumph and the first row of medallions featuring Nereids and Sirens.

Neptune's procession is neither in the center of the mosaic nor in a hexagonal medallion; it has no inner border, which increases the space devoted to the scene, which is "very lively" and colorful.

The geometric center of the composition is occupied by a round medallion, possibly depicting Amphitrite. Two other medallions surrounding Neptune depict Nereids on sea animals and mermaids accompanied by musical instruments. These arrangements are "the only trace of symmetry in the composition". The medallions surrounding Neptune feature alternating Nereids and mermaids: the Nereids ride sea panthers and, among the mermaids with "gallinaceous legs", two have instruments, a flute and a lyre, and the last must be singing. The number of mermaids is "by mythology", and they are equipped with wings and feathers.

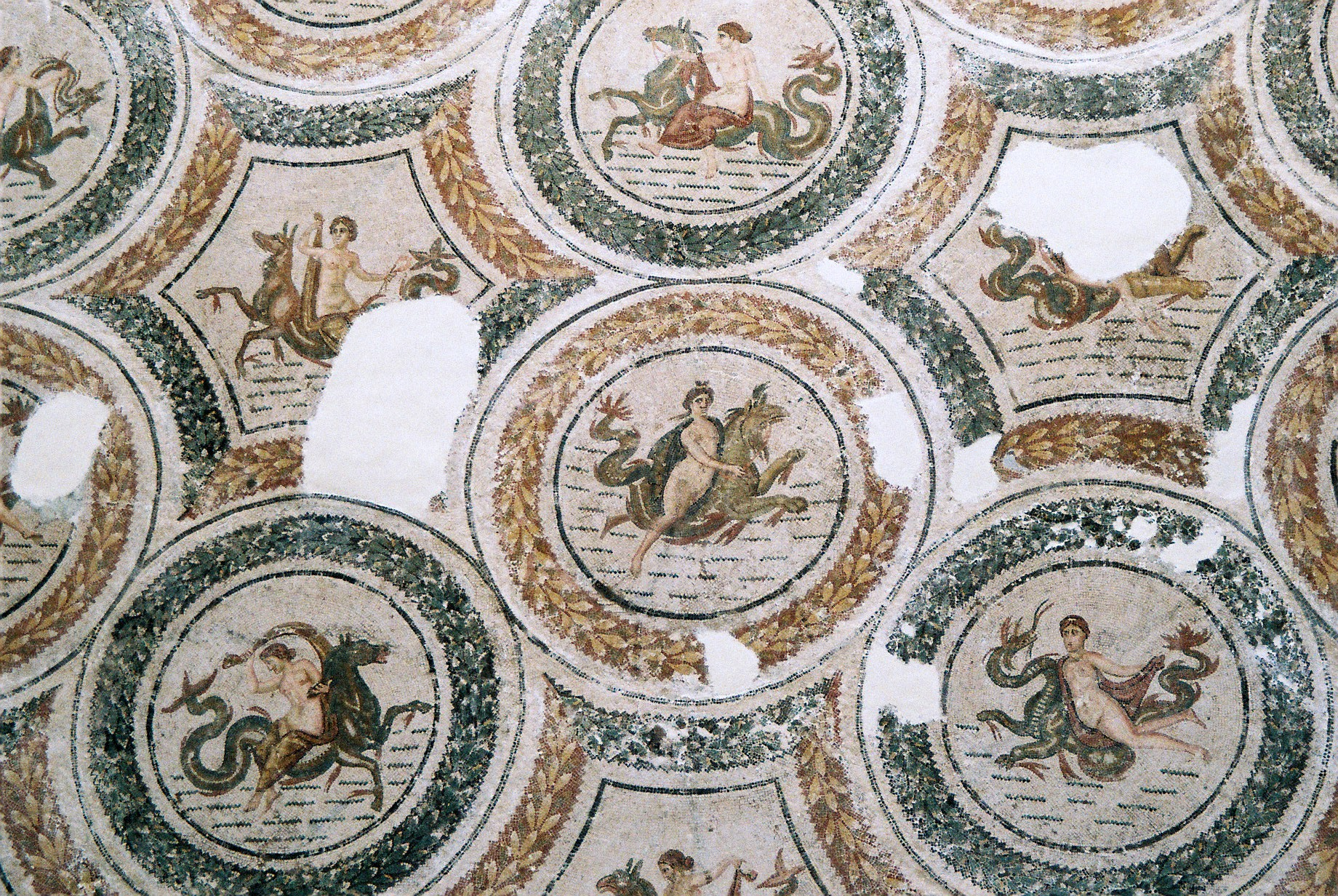
View of some of the medallions featuring Nereids riding sea creatures.

The deity is leaning forward, arm outstretched, on her moving chariot, wheel back, in a posture "full of ardor and vivacity". The chariot is composed of four sea creatures. Neptune's face, frowning, reveals anger. The god wears a trident on his left arm and brandishes his other arm forward.

=== Medallions ===
The medallions represent independent motifs "one from the other", but together they represent "the goddesses of the sea escorting Neptune". A garland surrounds the medallions. These represent mermaids, half-woman, half-bird creatures, Nereids, and ichthyocentaurs.

Ichthyocentaurs with a rudder or conch shell are found at the edges of the work, while others have a fascinum, a "cross-shaped pole" perhaps associated with horse breeding or a pedum, a satyr's utensil. Medallions that are not complete because of the border are either empty or occupied by dolphins with a trident.

Land animal front end	Number of performances
Bull	5
Griffin	5
Panthera	5
Dragon	5
Horses	10
Lion	1
Lioness	1
Capricorns	2
Deer	1
Goat	2
Tiger	1
Wolf	1
Aries	1

The Nereids are on the backs of sea creatures: the forequarters are those of a land animal, and all the creatures have "long fish tails". Some have fins and "greenish colors". The Nereids are full of grace and in a variety of attitudes, naked or veiled, on their backs or juxtaposed with the fantastic animal at their side, and equipped with a wide range of accessories (cornucopia, conch shell, rudder, fruit basket, lotus, scepter, thyrse...).

Characters	Attributes
Centaurs	torch-anchor-gouvernail-oat-conque
Nymphs	oar-twig-lotus leaf-sceptre-thyrse-horn of plenty-sword

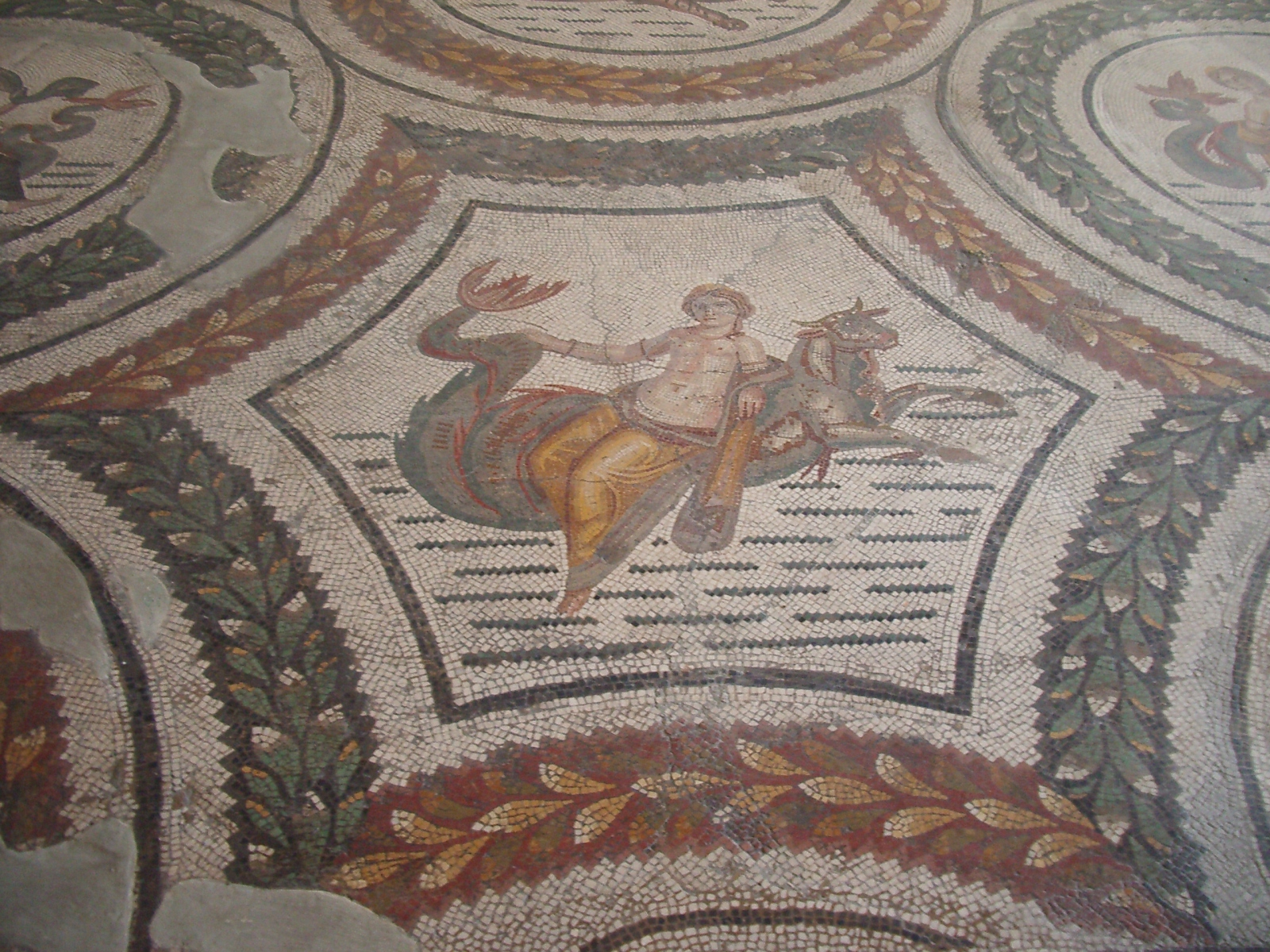
Nereide.

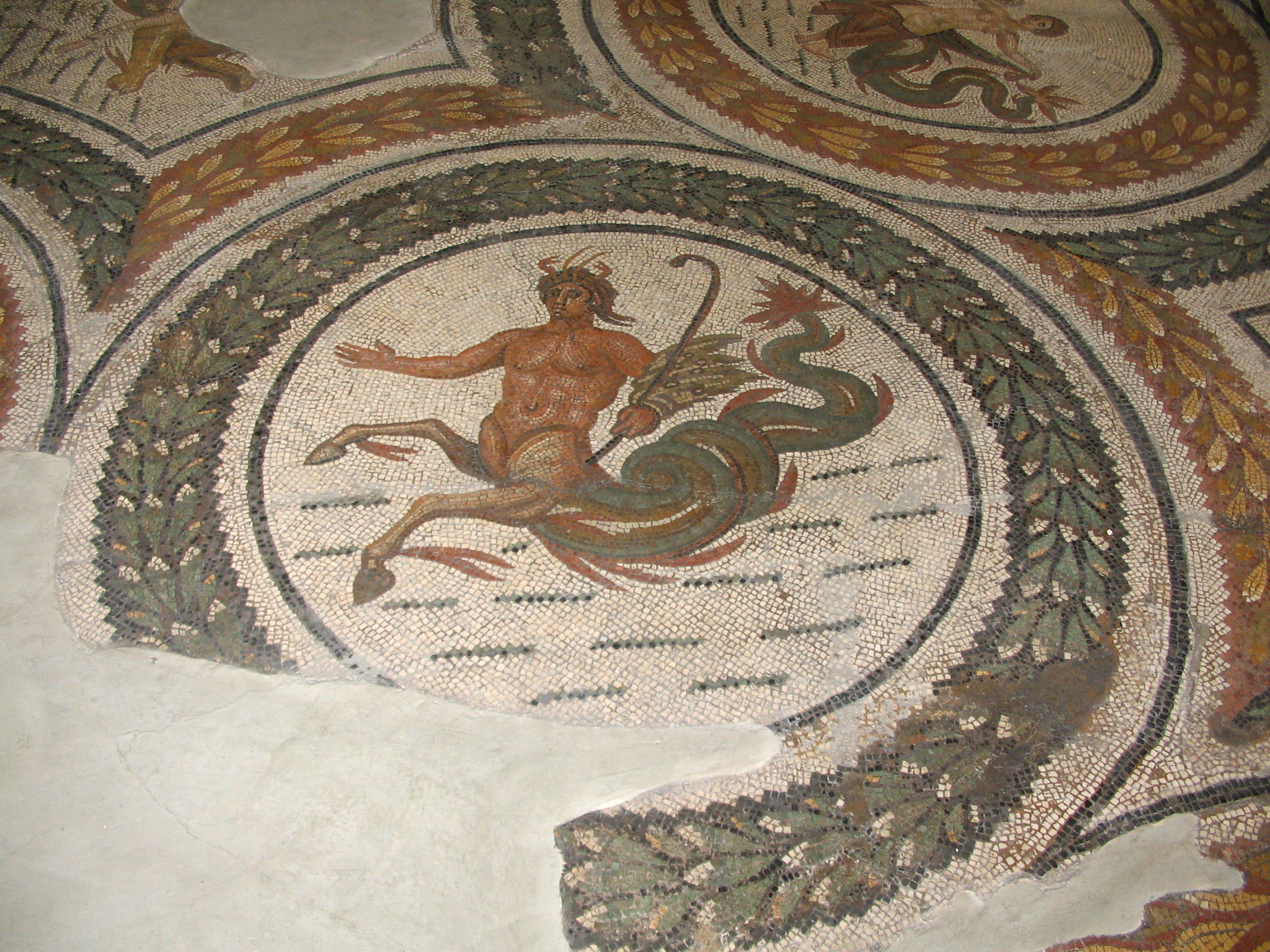
Ichtyocentaure.

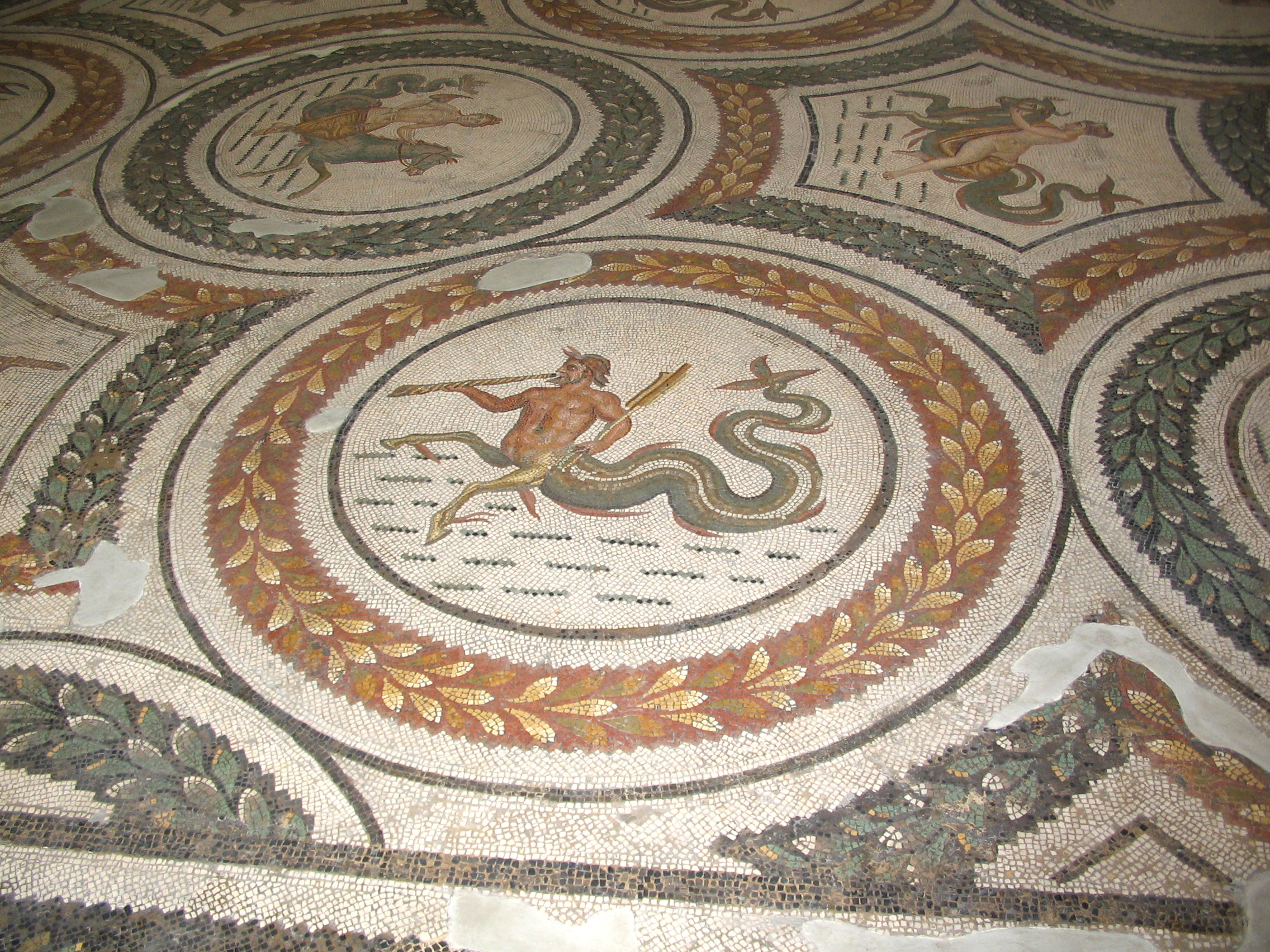
Ichtyocentaure blowing into a conch shell.

== Interpretation of the Neptune Triumph mosaic ==
=== A work of art created by a multi-talented team ===
The subject and composition are not original, but the work "is redeemed by the care of the execution, the beauty of the drawing and the variety of the work". The cartoons for the work, of "quite fine taste", were produced by the same artist.

However, the same craftsmen did not work on the realization of the medallions, as there are differences in treatment. Indeed, the quality of the various medallions is uneven: On this relatively large site, mosaicists of varying talents worked and there was undoubtedly a "division of labor". The perimeter was made by a single person, and the medallions were either made on-site by different people or made elsewhere and only inserted into the final work. The mortar used to support the mosaics was also of varying quality, a feature also noted by the excavators.

This diversity of execution, with an "excellent" triumph of Neptune according to René du Coudray de La Blanchère, but other elements "mediocre [...] [or even] completely lacking", such as the representation of a woman on a tiger, does not prevent a good overall impression.

Medallions often follow an east–west axis, so that they can be seen not from the entrance but from the back of the room, where the owner's bed is located. However, some are oriented outwards, perhaps about the location of beds or openings in the wall. The composition states "remains to be studied".

Among the works discovered in the Sorothus house, the panther medallion is considered "one of the finest representations of animal art to be found in Roman Tunisian mosaics". The fineness of the tesserae and the delicacy of this medallion point to the same artist as for the marine panther medallions in the Neptune mosaic.

=== A work of art to showcase the owner's activities ===
Sorothus was not just a "simple stud farm owner" even if his fortune was linked to racehorses.

==== Horse breeder and landowner ====
Sorothus was a prominent Hadrumetan of the late first and early second centuries, a breeder of horses that raced in Byzacene and even Rome, a merchant, and a member of a sodality. Sorothus raced his horses under the color blue.

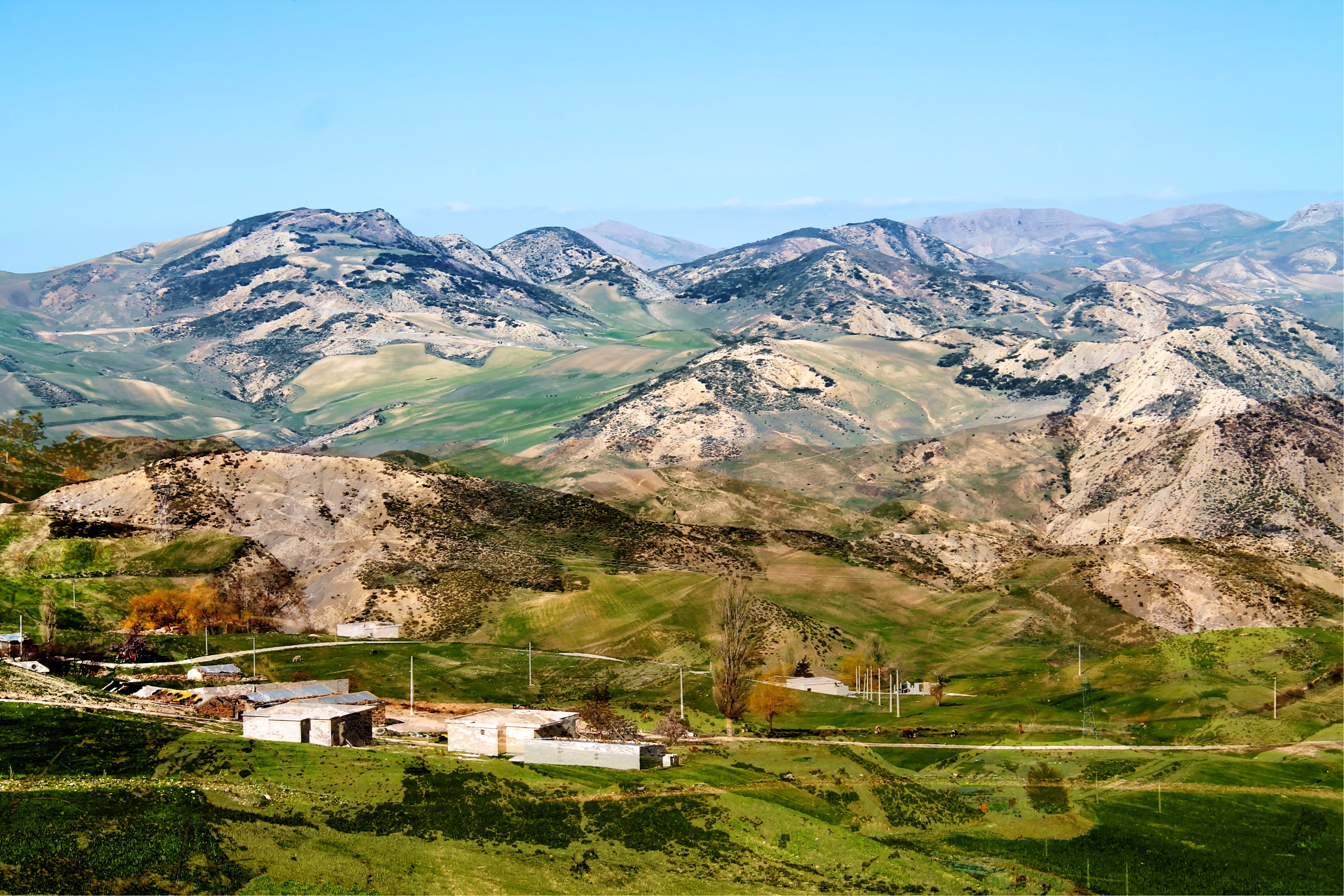
Landscape of the Souk Ahras region.

African horses and jockeys were renowned. Horse-breeding had an excellent reputation in Numidia "from Numidian times". A salthus Sorothensis was identified there, 280 km from Sousse, towards Souk Ahras in present-day Algeria thanks to an inscription (CIL, VIII, 111502), since lost, which may have been the place of origin of the equids.

This inscription, found in reuse in a late fortress, has disappeared. It was found 3 km from the village of Aïn Babouche, at a site that yielded mosaics with motifs similar to those found at Hadrumète. The site could not be used for growing wheat or orchards, but the water provided abundant grass, which led to the breeding of famous horses exported to Rome.

"Saturno Augu(sto) sacrum, / Genio salt(us) Sorothens(is), / M. Fl(avius) Terti(us), pro salute / dom(ini) Imp(eratoris) Iuli Ma[xi]m(ini), [ar]am fec(it)."

The inscription is dedicated to the salute of Emperor Maximin according to Marcel Le Glay and of the genius of saltus by M. Falvius Tertius.

The horse mosaic features rocks of "a rather superficial shape". Jean-Pierre Laporte, who compared the landscapes of the presumed Saltus Sorothensis with the landscapes on the mosaics of the house of Sorothus, concludes that they are "evocative enough", perhaps based on an oral description. The landscape on the stud farm mosaic may be that of this region, as the mosaic may be realistic.

==== Commercial activities ====
The representation of the room's entrance and exit pattern is perhaps an indication of the owner's commercial and maritime activities. Sorothus was involved in maritime trade, although he probably didn't own any ships. The owner's name appears several times on the house's mosaics. The representation of Neptune is there to emphasize that the owner put trading ships on the sea and wished to curry favor with the master of this element.

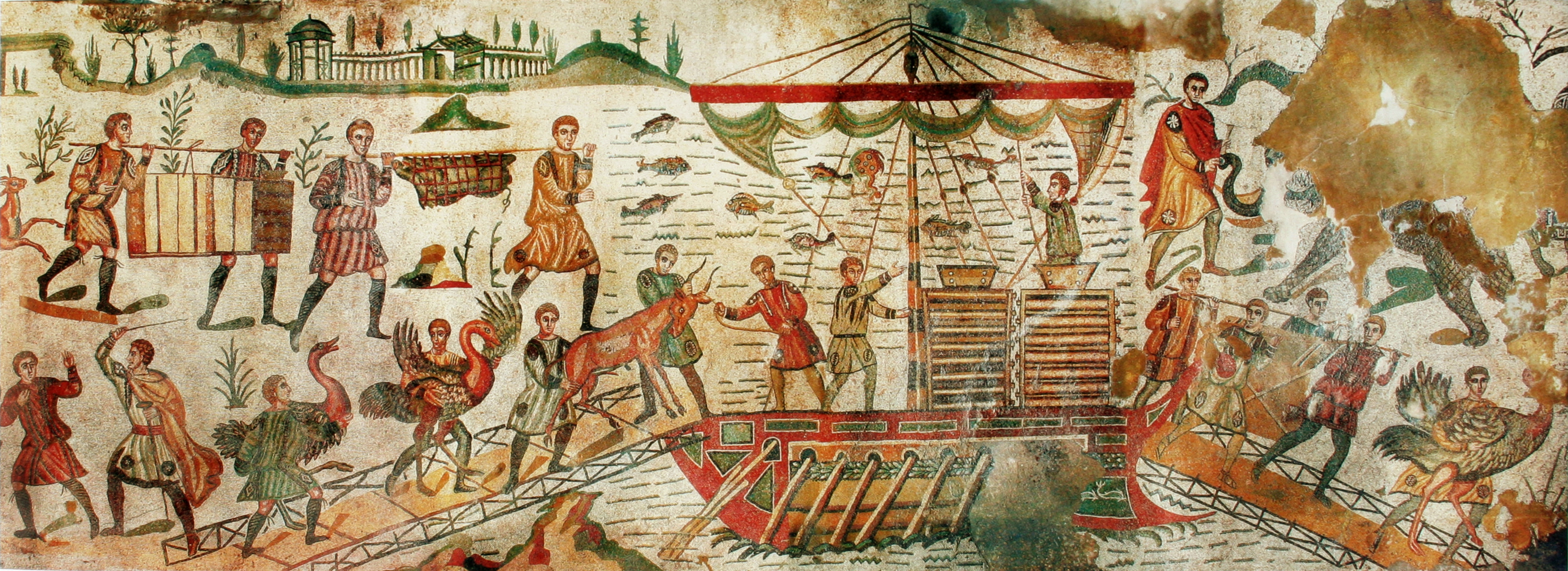
Transporting exotic animals on a mosaic from the Roman villa of Casale.

He was also to provide wild animals for the amphitheater shows, with activity on the sea evoked by Neptune's procession. The panther evokes the role of Munerarius. With its collar, it represents a domesticated animal. According to Louis Foucher, the inscriptions ad leonem and ad aprum evoke summer and winter; Henri Lavagne thinks they represent the animals of the arena. This action in favor of the amphitheater games can be linked to the associations known as sodalities. Sorothus captured animals destined for the games, while his tamer's domesticated animals intended for "bloodless games".

==== Social activity as part of a sodality ====
The owner was an important member of a sodality, the Taurisci.

Restoration work on the mosaics found in the Sorothus house sometimes makes interpretation difficult, even if there are clues to the owner's activities. The fascinum post is different from earlier drawings and resembles the Taurisci sodality symbol. Some ichthyocentaurs carry a pedum, an instrument associated with satyrs. The panther and lion found on mosaics in the house of Sorothus are "wild beasts tamed by Dionysus". Representations of lone panthers were popular in Hadrumetes.

=== A work belonging to a wealthy Sahelian urban dwelling, its history influenced by the local context. ===
The Sorothus house belongs to the group of houses found in today's Tunisian Sahel, at Acholla or Thysdrus. The houses of the upper classes served private as well as public life. However, archaeologists have noted a "contradiction between the quality of the mosaics and the mediocrity of the wall elevations", an "indication of the age" of the buildings.

According to Gilbert Charles-Picard, these wealthy residences were occupied by members of "a class of large landowners and merchants", who owned land and worked in the ports.

Sorothus was a leading figure in his city, a Roman citizen whose cognomen is the only one known, and is very rare, so it was unnecessary to indicate the tria nomina. Louis Foucher considers him a "parvenu".

The owner belonged to "a class of large landowners and merchants" from Byzacene, many of whose domus disappeared in the 2nd century. Jean-Pierre Laporte raises the question of the disappearance of Byzacene's wealthy mansions, some of which occurred in the first half of the 2nd century. According to Charles-Picard, the disappearance was linked to the proscriptions following the revolution of 238 and the beginning of the reign of Gordian III. Laporte points out that there is no certainty for the house of Sorothus, even though the most recent coin discovered dates from the reign of Philip the Arab and the rural estate of the house's owner belonged to the imperial domain during the reign of Maximin, suggesting a deterioration in the situation of the wealthy Hadrumetan family in the troubled period following the assassination of Severus Alexander.

== See also ==
- Roman mosaic
- Roman Africa
- Great Lillebonne mosaic
- Carthage Circus Mosaic

== Bibliography ==
- Abed-Ben Khedher, Aïcha Ben (1992). Le musée du Bardo: une visite guidée. Tunis: Cérès. ISBN 978-9973-700-83-4.
- Bourdin, Stéphane; Pagliara, Alessandro (2019). Marie-René de La Blanchère: dalle terre pontine all'Africa romana,. Rome: École française de Rome. ISBN 978-2-7283-1414-0.
- Dunbabin, Katherine (1978). The Mosaics of Roman North Africa: Studies in Iconography and Patronage. Oxford: Clarendon Press. ISBN 978-0-19-813217-2.
- Gauckler, Paul (1910). Inventaire des mosaïques de la Gaule et de l'Afrique, vol. II: Afrique proconsulaire (Tunisie). Paris: Ernest Leroux.
- Hassine Fantar, M'hamed; Ouanallah, Samir; Daoulatli, Abdelaziz (2015). Le Bardo, la grande histoire de la Tunisie: musée, sites et monuments. Alif. ISBN 978-9938-9581-1-9.
- Slim, Hédi; Fauqué, Nicolas (2001). La Tunisie antique: de Hannibal à saint Augustin. Paris: Mengès. ISBN 978-2-85620-421-4.
- Laporte, Jean-Pierre (2017). Gustave Hannezo (1857-1922) et l'archéologie tunisienne », Cartagine, Studi i Ricerche. doi:10.13125/caster/3040.
- Yacoub, Mohamed (1993). Le Musée du Bardo: départements antiques. Tunis: Agence nationale du patrimoine. ISBN 978-9973-917-12-6.
- Yacoub, Mohamed (1995). Splendeurs des mosaïques de Tunisie. Tunis: Agence nationale du patrimoine. ISBN 9973-917-23-5.
- du Coudray de La Blanchère, René (1888). « La Mosaïque de Neptune à Sousse ». Bulletin archéologique du Comité des travaux historiques et scientifiques.
- Ennaïfer, Mongi (1983). « Le thème des chevaux vainqueurs à travers la série des mosaïques africaines ». Mélanges de l'École française de Rome: Antiquité.
- Foucher, Louis (1964). Hadrumetum. Université de Tunis/PUF.
- Gauckler, Paul (1897). « Les mosaïques de l'arsenal à Sousse ». Revue archéologique.
- Laporte, Jean-Pierre; Lavagne, Henri (2006). La domus de Sorothus et ses mosaïques.
- Trousset, Pol (2000). « Hadrumetum », dans Gabriel Camps (dir.), Encyclopédie berbère vol. 22: Hadrumetum – Hidjaba, Aix-en-Provence. Édisud. ISBN 2-7449-0127-X.
