= Moustapha Khodja =

Tunisian politician and reformer

Prime Minister of Tunisia
- In office 1782–1800
- Monarch: Hammuda I
- Preceded by: Rejeb Khaznadar
- Succeeded by: Youssef Saheb Ettabaa

Personal details
- Born: c. 1720 Caucasus
- Died: 10 October 1800 (aged 79–80) Tunis, Beylik of Tunis
- Spouse: Princess Lalla Khadija

Moustapha Khodja (Arabic: مصطفى خوجة; died October 10, 1800), was a Tunisian politician and a mamluk of Georgian origin. He became Prime Minister of the Beylik of Tunis.

== Early career ==
Born in the Caucasus, he was enslaved and sent to Tunis in 1730 at a very young age. There he was placed in the charge of Ali Pasha who lodged him in the Madrasa El Bachia, which he had just built in the medina of Tunis, where he followed a religious course under renowned teachers. He excelled there, especially in the art of bookbinding.

When Muhammad Rashid Bey took power, Moustapha Khodja went into the service of his brother the future Ali Bey as his private khaznadar (treasurer). In this capacity he was responsible for the education of his son, Hammouda Bey, together with Hammouda Ben Abdelaziz, Ali Bey's principal secretary. He became khaznadar of the regency when Ali Bey came to power in 1759. He married Ali Bey's eldest daughter, who died around 1777.

== Prime minister ==
When Prince Hammouda became bey in 1782, he made Moustapha Khodja his main minister and advisor. Very pious, he left to make the hajj pilgrimage at the beginning of the reign. Upon his return he guided the new Bey both in matters of military policy involving conflict with the regencies of Tripoli and Algiers an in negotiations with the European consuls. In 1782 he granted an exclusive concession to the fr:Compagnie royale d'Afrique to harvest coral in all Tunisian waters. Under his leadership Tunisia had stable government stability, regular tax collection and significant agricultural and textile exports. In addition, Tunisia was freed from the influence of Algiers, whose involvement had been decisive in the reestablishment of power of the sons of Hussein Bey in 1756 and which had frequently interfered in the affairs of the country. In 1795 he established a military expedition to Tripoli to restore Yusuf Karamanli, who was friendly to the Husainid dynasty.

== Personal life ==
He died in 1800 without leaving any descendants. Around 1781 he married Khadija, the youngest daughter of Ali II Bey, in his second marriage.
