= Youssef Saheb Ettabaa =

Tunisian politician and reformer

Prime Minister of Tunisia
- In office 1800 – 23 January 1815
- Monarchs: Hammuda I Uthman I Mahmud I
- Preceded by: Moustapha Khodja
- Succeeded by: Larbi Zarrouk Khaznadar

Personal details
- Born: c. 1765 Moldavia
- Died: 23 January 1815 (aged 49–50) Le Bardo, Beylik of Tunis
- Spouse: Princess Lalla Khadija

Youssef Saheb Ettabaa (Arabic: يوسف صاحب الطابع; born c. 1765, died 23 January 1815), was a Tunisian politician and a mameluk of Moldavian origin. He became a prime minister of the Beylik of Tunis.

== Early career ==
He was enslaved as a boy and manumitted in Istanbul in 1777 when he was thirteen by Baccar Djellouli, a rich Sfaxi shipowner, trader and qaid. He lived for several years in Sfax with the Djellouli family, while getting used to local customs and the Tunisian language. In 1781 he was offered to the Bey's heir Hammouda Pasha, then aged 18. Minister fr:Hammouda Ben Abdelaziz was responsible for his instruction.

== Rise to power ==
Having become an influential personality and being very able, Youssef obtained the post of Keeper of the Seals from Hammouda Pasha on his accession, that is to say he was appointed saheb ettabaâ, from 1782, replacing Moustapha Khodja, who remained the bey's main minister. He soon established himself as the main director of Beylical politics as well as the regency's most important merchant.

Between 1783 and 1815, a large part of the Tunisian economy was in the hands of Saheb Ettabaâ. He took charge of tax receipts, and placed loyal qaids throughout the country. On the diplomatic front, Youssef Saheb Ettabaâ brought Hammouda Bey closer to the Ottoman dynasty. In 1795 he took control of all commercial imports and exports of all commercial activity; he also supervised the artisanal trade, in particular the manufacture of chechias, and intensified the arms race in the Mediterranean Sea during the years of Franco–British rivalry.

== Prime minister ==
Saheb Ettabaâ became principal minister in 1800 after the death of Moustapha Khodja. Osman Bey appointed him khaznadar (treasurer, Minister of Finance) when he took the throne. Too powerful, he was assassinated after the death of his protector Hammouda Pasha, at the instigation of princes Hussein and Moustapha, manipulated by Mohamed Larbi Zarrouk Khaznadar, their maternal uncle. The attack took place on September 15, 1814, in front of the entrance to the Bardo palace seraglio; he died of his injuries on 23 January 1815.

== Legacy ==
Saheb Ettabaâ was responsible for the building of the Saheb Ettabaâ Palace, the Madrasa Saheb Ettabaâ and the Saheb Ettabaâ Mosque in Halfaouine.

He was responsible for the early career promotion of Mustapha Saheb Ettabaa, with whom he was unrelated.

== Bibliography ==
- Le garde du sceau: Youssef Saheb Ettabaa, Lotfi M'Raihi, Atlas Edition, 2002
