= Muhammad al-Warghi =

Tunisian poet and writer

- Born: circa 1713; Kef Governorate
- Died: 1776; Kef Governorate
- Occupation(s): writer, poet, teacher
- Notable work: Maqamat

Abū ʿAbd Allāh Muḥammad bin Aḥmad al-Warghi (Arabic: محمد الورغي), (circa 1713 – 1776) was a Tunisian writer and poet in the 18th century. he belonged to the tribe of Warghah, which was settling near the city of Kef in the south, or said to be on the border of Tunisia and Algeria.

Al-Warghi was educated and taught during the reign of Ali Bey I, and was his court poet. His wulogy poetry is divided between Ali Bey I and Ali II.

== Biography ==
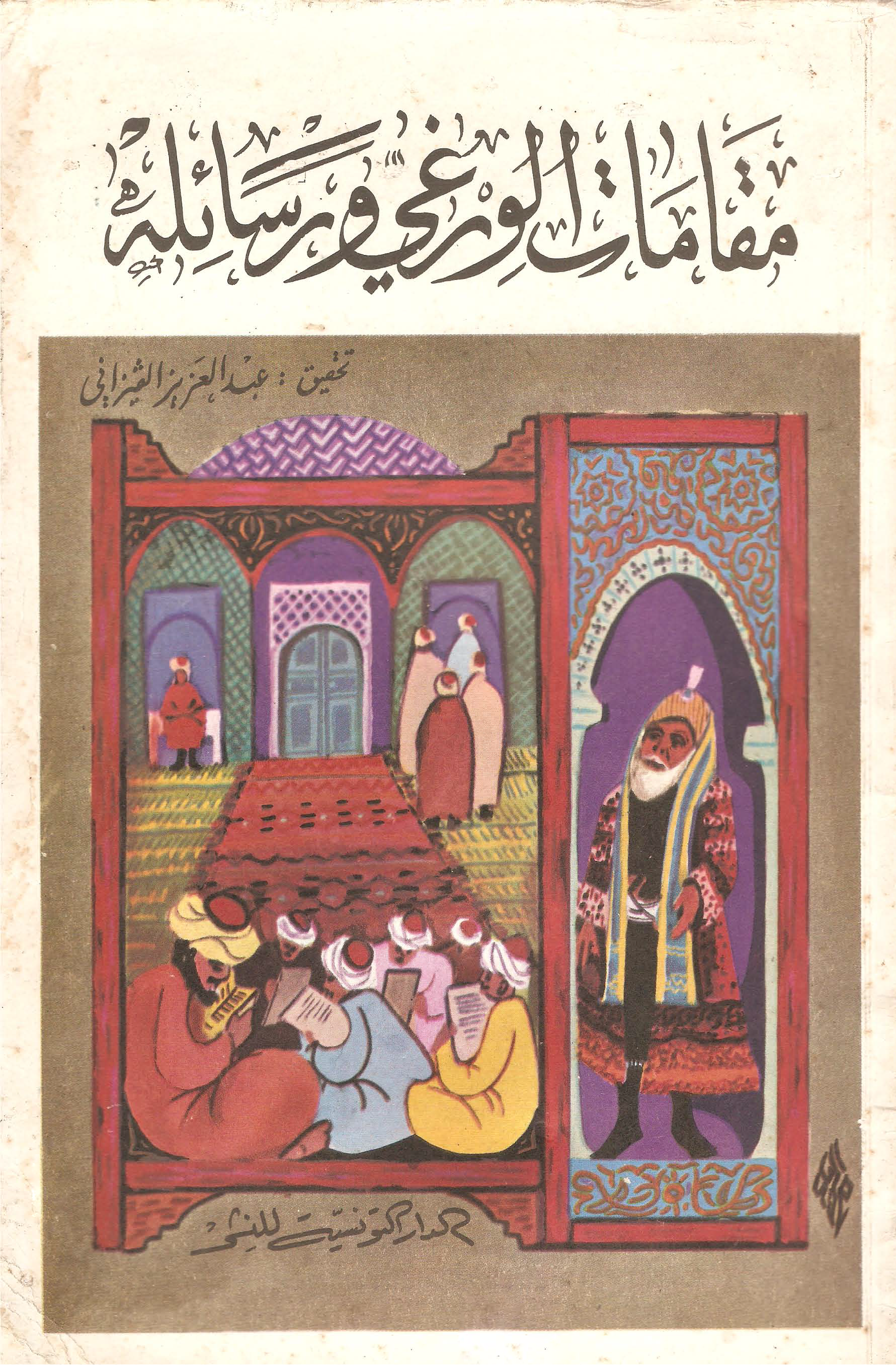
Cover book of Maqamat al-Warghi wa Rasa'iluhu (Maqamat of al-Warghi and his letters) by Mahmoud Rebaï, Published in Tunis, by al-Dar al-Tunisiyah lil-Nashr, 1972.

Mohammed bin Ahmed al-Wrghi was born in the village of Wargha, located at Jabal Warghahh between the village of Al-Tuwairf and the city of El Kef, around 1707–1713. He first joined the Madrasahs and learned the Qur'an, fiqh, history, modern sciences, logic, Arabic linguistics at the Al-Zaytuna Mosque in Tunis. Then, He sat down to teach at Al-Zaytouna Mosque later, and worked as a writer in the office of Ali Bey I. He was imprisoned in 1755 during the reign of Muhammad I ar-Rashid and died in 1776.
