= Ali II ibn Hussein =

Bey of Tunis (1712–1782)

Bey of Tunis
- Reign: 1759–1782
- Predecessor: Muhammad I ar-Rashid
- Successor: Hammuda ibn Ali
- Born: Ali II ibn Hussein Bey; 24 November 1712; Le Bardo, Kingdom of Tunisia
- Died: 26 May 1782 (aged 69); Le Bardo, Kingdom of Tunisia
- Burial: Tourbet el Bey, Tunis, Tunisia
- Spouse: Lalla Mahbouba; Lalla Fatima
- Issue: Hammuda ibn Ali; Uthman ibn Ali; Slimane Bey; Omar Bey; Mohammed Maamoun Bey; Lalla Aisha Beya; Lalla Amina Beya; Lalla Khadija Beya
- Ali II Ben Hussein I Bey
- Dynasty: Husainides
- Father: Al-Husayn I ibn Ali
- Religion: Islam

Ali II ibn Hussein (Arabic: علي الثاني بن حسين), commonly referred to as Ali II Bey (Arabic: علي باي الثاني ; 24 November 1712 – 26 May 1782) or Ali Pacha Bey II was the fourth leader of the Husainid dynasty and the ruler of Tunisia from 1759 until his death in 1782. He was the son of Al-Husayn I ibn Ali. He was succeeded in turns by his sons Hammuda ibn Ali and Uthman ibn Ali.

Ali II ibn Hussein
- Royal Family of Tunisia

Preceded by Muhammad I ar-Rashid	Bey of Tunis; 1759–1782	Succeeded by Hammuda ibn Ali

== See also ==
- Moustapha Khodja
- Muhammad al-Warghi
- Rejeb Khaznadar
