= Little Pacha Mosque =

Mosque in Tunis, Tunisia

- مسجد حمودة باشا الحسيني
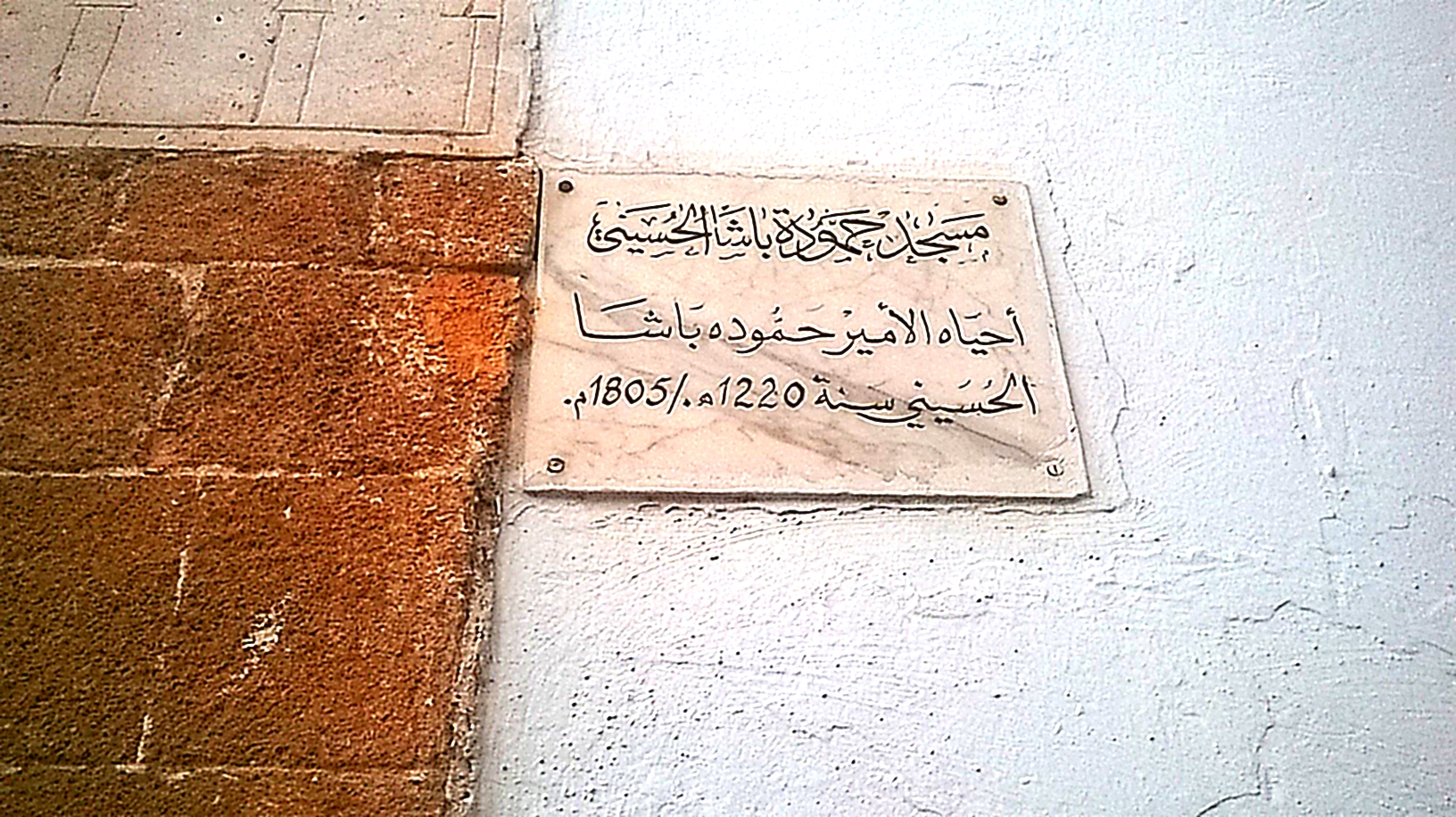

- Location within Tunisia

Religion
- Affiliation: Islam
- Branch/tradition: Sunni

Location
- Location: Tunis, Tunisia
- Coordinates: 36.797897°N 10.169368°E

Architecture
- Type: Mosque

The Little Pacha Mosque is one on the mosques of the medina of Tunis, located in the west of the city. It is also known as the Mosque of the Husainid Hammuda Pacha (Arabic: مسجد حمودة باشا الحسيني) in opposition to the Mosque of the Muradid Hammuda Pacha.

== History ==
It was constructed in 1805 (221 years ago) (1220 Hijri) by Hammuda Pacha, the Husainid bey of Tunis, from 1782 until his death, as indicated by the commemorative plaque.
