= Rejeb Khaznadar =

Tunisian politician and reformer

1st Prime Minister of Tunisia
- In office 1759–1782
- Monarch: Ali II
- Preceded by: Office created
- Succeeded by: Moustapha Khodja

Personal details
- Born: c. 1720 Tunis, Beylik of Tunis
- Died: 21 May 1797 (aged 76–77) Tunis, Beylik of Tunis
- Spouse: Princess Lalla Fatma

Rejeb Khaznadar (Arabic: رجب خزندار; died May 21, 1797, in Tunis) was a Tunisian politician and before that he was a mamluk of Greek origin. He became Prime Minister of the Beylik of Tunis in 1759, becoming the first Prime Minister in the history of Tunisia.

== Biography ==
Rejeb Khaznadar was one of the Mamluks of the Husseinite court and husband of Princess Fatma, daughter of Hussein Bey, founder of dynasty.

He was appointed the bey's treasurer (khaznadar) under his brother in law Muhammad I ar-Rashid, and then in 1759 chief minister by Ali Bey, becoming the first to occupy this function. He was replaced in 1782 by Moustapha Khodja. The chronicler Ahmad ibn Abi Diyaf declared that he was trustworthy and peace-loving politician until his death.
