= Saheb Ettabaâ Palace =

Palace in Tunis

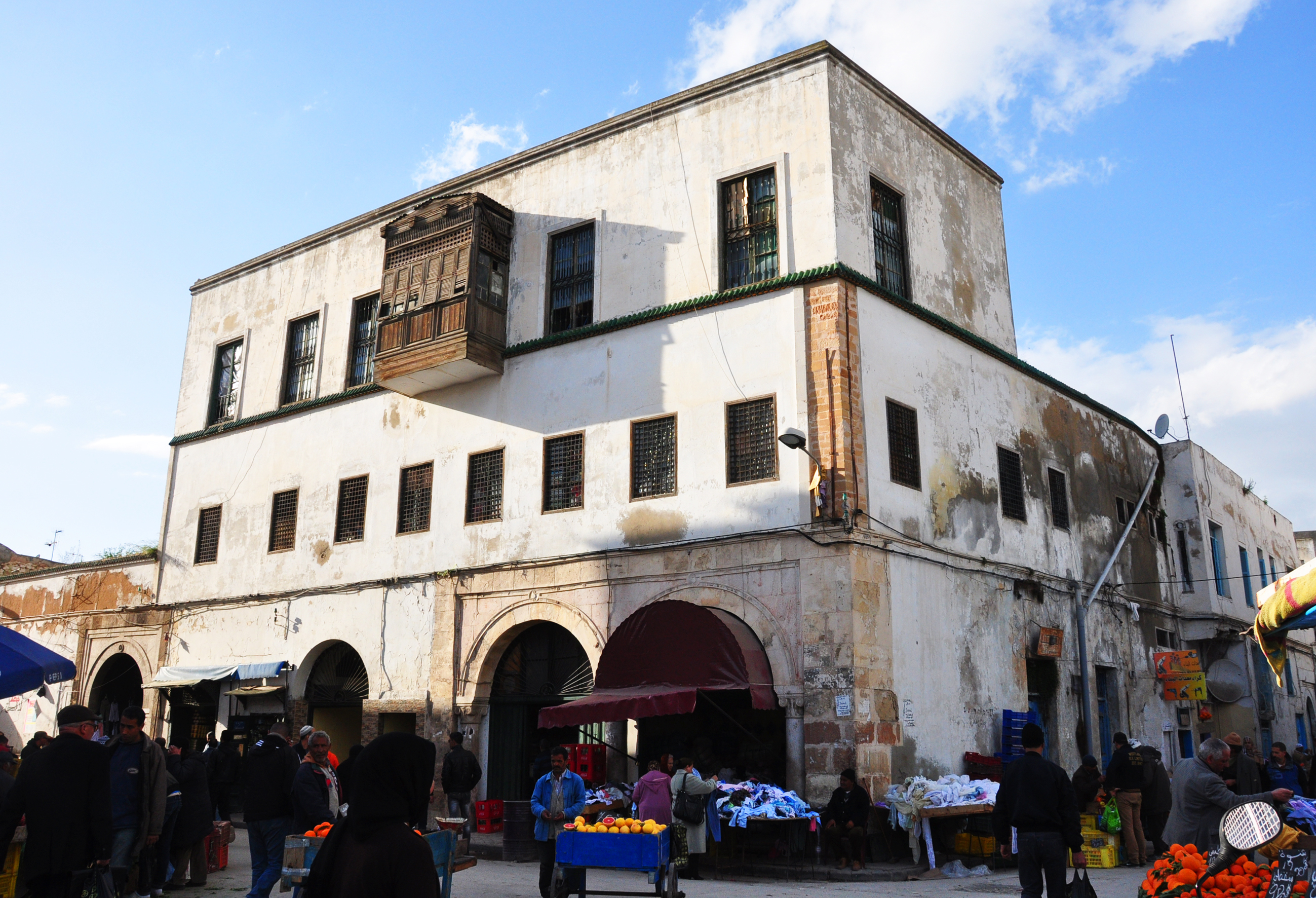
- Interactive map of the Saheb Ettabaâ Palace area

General information
- Type: Palace
- Architectural style: Moorish; Tunisian; Ottoman
- Location: Medina of Tunis, Tunis, Tunisia
- Year built: 1808
- Client: Youssef Saheb Ettabaa

Height
- Height: 20 m (68 ft)

Design and construction
- Architect: Sassi ibn Frija

Saheb Ettabaâ Palace is an old palace in the Medina of Tunis.

== Localization ==
It is located in south-west of the Halfaouine square.

== History ==
Youssef Saheb Ettabaa ordered this palace to be built at the beginning of the 19th century.

In the same period, the whole Halfaouine district witnessed many modifications: A new mosque (Saheb Ettabaâ Mosque), two madrasas, a hammam, souk Jedid, a fountain (sabil), a mausoleum (Tourba) and a foundouk were built there.

== Architecture ==
The palace can be found at the entrance of Souk Jedid. It has 3 floors: The ground floor was used for the stables and warehouses while the two remaining floors were for the private apartments and salons.
