= Muhammad I ar-Rashid =

Bey of Tunis (1710–1759)

Bey of Tunis
- Reign: 1756–1759
- Predecessor: Abu l-Hasan Ali I
- Successor: Ali II ibn Hussein
- Born: Muhammad I ar-Rashid Bey c. 1710; Le Bardo, Kingdom of Tunisia
- Died: 12 February 1759 (aged 49); Le Bardo, Kingdom of Tunisia
- Burial: Hussein I Mausoleum, Tunis, Tunisia
- Spouse: Lalla Aisha; Lalla Fatima
- Issue: Mahmud ibn Muhammad; Ismail Bey
Names
- Mohammed Rachid Ben Hussein I Bey
- Dynasty: Husainides
- Father: Al-Husayn I ibn Ali
- Religion: Islam

Muhammad I ar-Rachid (Arabic: محمد الأول الرشيد), commonly referred to as Rachid Bey (Arabic: رشيد باي ; 1710 – 12 February 1759) was the third leader of the Husainid Dynasty and the ruler of Tunisia from 1756 until his death. His son was Mahmud ibn Muhammad.

Muhammad I ar-Rashid
- Royal Family of Tunisia

Preceded by 'Abu'l Hasan 'Ali I	Bey of Tunis; 1756–1759	Succeeded by Ali II ibn Hussein

== See also ==
- Rejeb Khaznadar
