= Le Bardo =

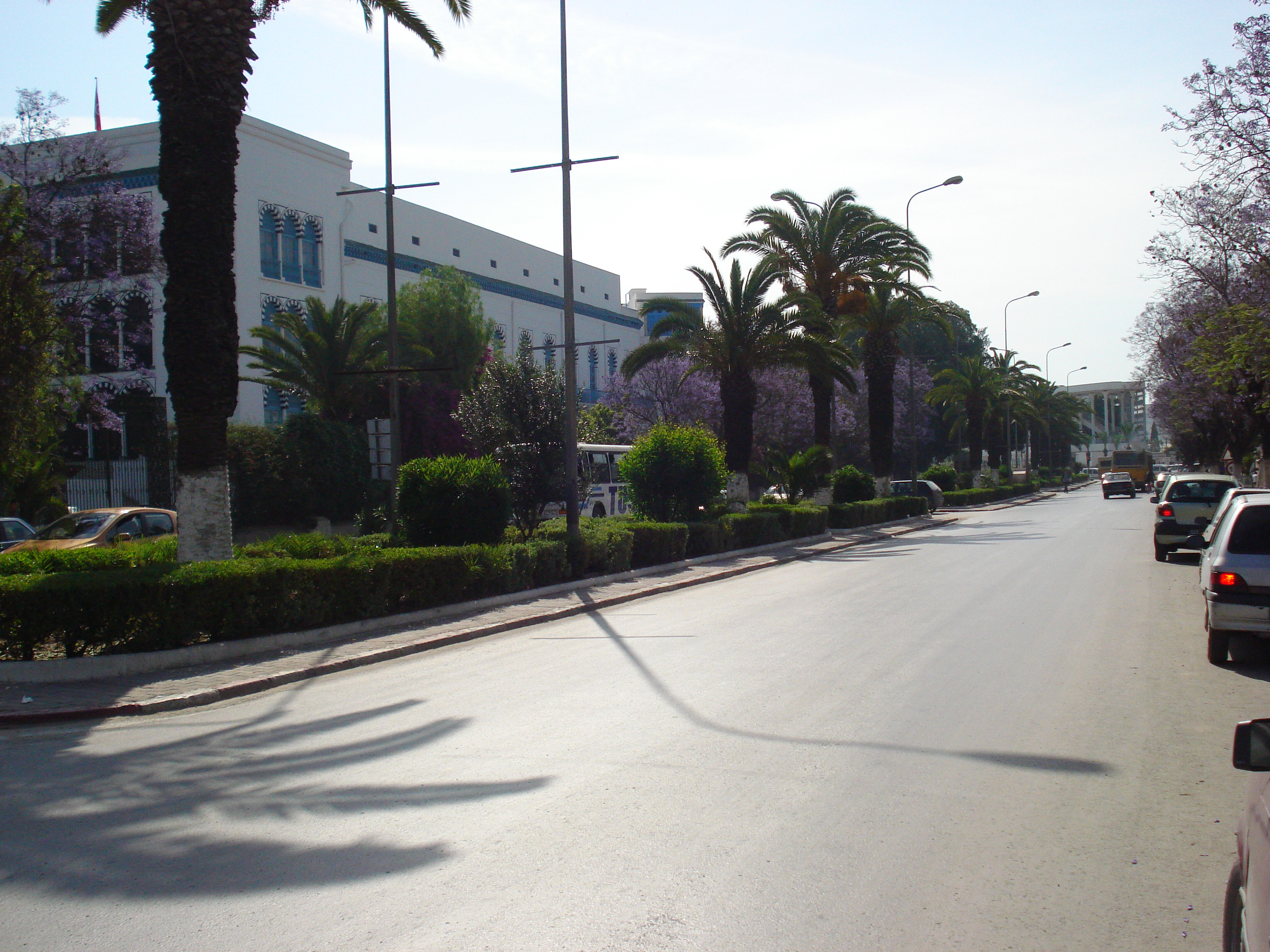
- Avenue of 2-Mars in Bardo

- Location in Tunisia
- Coordinates: 36°48′33″N 10°8′26″E
- Country: Tunisia
- Governorate: Tunis Governorate
- Delegation(s): Le Bardo

Government
  - Mayor: Mounir Tlili (Tunisian Alternative)

Population (2004)
  - Total: 73,953
- Time zone: UTC1 (CET)

Bardo (Arabic: باردو Bardow) is a Tunisian city west of Tunis. As of 2004, the population is 73,953.

Built by the Hafsid dynasty in the 14th century, the name Bardo comes from the Spanish word "prado" meaning "meadow". Bardo became a residence of the Tunis court in the 18th century. With the arrival of Husseinite beys, Bardo became a political, intellectual and religious center. The ancient beys' residence was the site of the Tunisian National Assembly headquarters, and the National Museum opened there in 1888.

The city gave its name to the Treaty of Bardo, signed in Ksar Saïd Palace, which placed Tunisia under a French protectorate in May 1881.

== History ==
Le Bardo was originally a palace built during the reign of the Hafsid Sultan Abu Faris Abd al-Aziz II (1394–1434). Its name is derived from the Spanish word prado, meaning a meadow and, by extension, a garden. This suggests that the palace was modeled after the princely residences of Muslim Andalusia and constructed with the help of Andalusian artists. At that time, it consisted of a series of parks and pleasure pavilions located about four kilometers from Tunis.

The site later enjoyed the patronage of the Muradid dynasty. Hammouda Pasha (1631–1666) restored the palace, making it the permanent residence of the dynasty. Travelers reported not only the luxurious residences but also the beauty of the gardens adorned with flowerbeds, fountains, and water features. With the arrival of the Husainids in the 18th century, the Bardo underwent further expansion and embellishment of its palaces, gardens, and annexes. A mosque was built under Hussein I Bey, and his successor Ali II Bey added ceremonial halls, including a courtroom and an audience chamber, while strengthening the fortifications with round towers.

Mohamed Rachid Bey built new apartments for himself, and Ali II added a domed pavilion in the gardens. Hammouda Pasha ordered the construction of a new audience hall called the "Pasha’s Hall." By the early 19th century, the complex also included a market, barracks, stables, and a prison, as well as the residences of senior officials. Around 1830, the royal city housed about 800 people. The painter Auguste Veillon later depicted An Arab Café at the Bardo in Tunis (now housed at the Museum of Art and History in Geneva).

A throne room existed in the palace around 1880. The esplanade and the arrival of the tramway in 1952 also marked important changes in the area.

A polytechnic school (1840–1855) was established under Ahmed I Beys' reign but was later replaced by a military academy active until 1866. A mint within the palace complex produced coins for the Regency from 1847 to 1891. Meanwhile, new buildings appeared outside the walls, such as the Ksar Saïd Palace, where the May 12, 1881, treaty establishing the French protectorate over Tunisia was signed, and an artillery barracks, opened in 1839.

A railway connection to Tunis was established in 1875, further strengthening Bardo’s role as a political center. With the establishment of the French protectorate, many demolitions occurred, including the southern wall, which was replaced by an esplanade.

The mint and military school were converted into barracks for the Beylical Guard. As the dynasty's lifestyle was scaled back, space was freed for the National Museum, which opened in 1882. The harem of Sadok Bey began housing antique collections in 1888, while the palace of Mahmoud Bey hosted the Arab collections from 1900 onward. With the arrival of the tramway in 1908, the surroundings of the city filled with residential developments, welcoming European families.

Le Bardo was officially made a municipality on May 8, 1909, though it remained sparsely populated, with just 384 residents in 1926.

After World War II, the municipality expanded its infrastructure with a police station, post office, schools, and a church, though it had few shops aside from cafés serving tourists visiting the museum. The town's residential function grew after the war, with the population increasing sixteenfold: from 968 in 1936 to 7,085 in 1946, and to 15,977 by 1956. This led to the expansion of the city around key transport routes. Tunisia’s independence did not slow this growth: by 1966 the population had reached 41,714, and by 1975 it was 49,367.

To address this rapid growth, public authorities initiated the construction of the Ezzouhour district, a working-class neighborhood to the south of the city, near the Séjoumi salt lake, extending into neighboring municipalities.

On March 18, 2015, the city was the site of a terrorist attack that left 24 people dead, including 20 tourists, and 47 others injured.

== Culture ==
The Bardo National Museum, established by a beylical decree on November 7, 1882, was officially inaugurated on May 7, 1888, in the presence of Ali III Bey. It is housed in part of the former Beylical Palace of the Bardo. As the oldest and most important museum in Tunisia, it holds nearly 130,000 artifacts divided among five departments, and is especially renowned for its mosaic collection, considered one of the richest in the world.

Bardo Museum in 2026.
