= Bouhdid Belhadi =

Tunisian LGBTQ rights activist

- بوحديد بالهادي
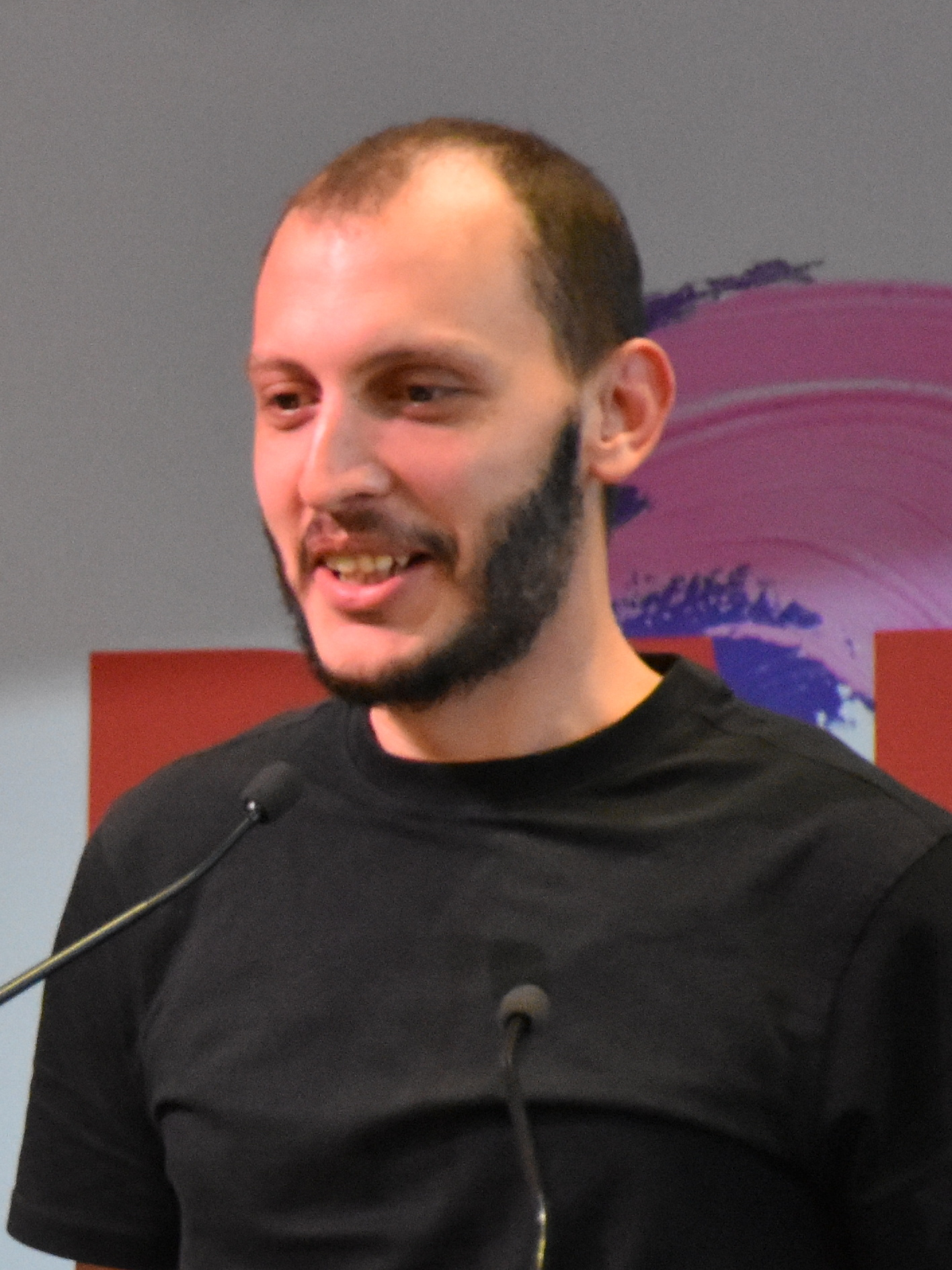
- Belhadi in 2025
- Born: Hammamet, Tunisia
- Occupation: LGBTQ rights activist
- Organization: Association Shams

Bouhdid Belhadi (Arabic: بوحديد بالهادي) is a Tunisian LGBTQ rights activist and prominent member of the Association Shams. He is also the director of the first LGBTQ web radio station of the Arab world, "Shams Rad".

== Biography ==
Born in Hammamet, Tunisia, Belhadi is a member of the Association Shams and director of the first ever LGBTQ web radio station of the Arab world, "Shams Rad", launched in December 2017. After the launch of "Shams Rad", Belhadi stated that he received 4,700 abusive messages, including death threats and "imams calling for me to be beaten and killed". He stated that he was also physically assaulted.

According to him, queer Tunisians face not only government discrimination, but also discrimination based on sexual orientation at the social level. He stated that family rejection, violence in public spaces, violence within families, suicide, and issues affecting institutional rights such as access to justice and public services are also issues that impact the LGBTQ population of the country; he also indicated that he is pessimistic about the repeal of Article 230 of the Penal Code.

In 2015, Hadi Sahly, the Vice President of Shams, stated that Belhadi received death threats during a Friday sermon at a mosque in Hammamet.

In 2016, he was forced to interrupt his studies and live in hiding because of the threats he received for a television appearance where he supported queer rights.

On 21 October 2017, Belhadi received the Galas LGBT Award 2017 at the eighth edition of the event held at the Mansion House in Dublin, Ireland; this award is given annually to individuals and organizations that fight for LGBTQ rights in countries that discriminate against this group.

In 2018, he was attacked by Rached Ghannouchi's bodyguard at the Maltese embassy in Tunisia.

On 2 April 2019, he was invited by Mohsen Marzouk, alongside the President of Shams Mounir Baatour, in the presence of Machrouu Tounes party member Khaoula Ben Aïcha. There, he expresses to her his absolute support for the rights of the LGBTQ community, given that it is a universal constitutional right.

On 17 May 2025, Belhadi received the Francophone LGBTQIA+ prize from the city of Paris.

== Distinctions ==
- 2017: Galas LGBT Award 2017
- 2025: Francophone LGBTQIA+ prize of the city of Paris
