= LGBTQ rights in Tunisia =

- Legal status: Illegal since 1913
- Penalty: Up to 3 years imprisonment
- Gender identity: No
- Military: Ambiguous
- Discrimination protections: None

Family rights
- Recognition of relationships: No recognition of same-sex unions
- Adoption: No

Lesbian, gay, bisexual, transgender, and queer (LGBTQ) people in Tunisia face legal challenges not experienced by non-LGBTQ residents. Both male and female same-sex sexual activity are illegal in the country. According to the United States Department of State's 2018 report on human rights in Tunisia, "authorities occasionally use the anti-sodomy law to detain and question persons about their sexual activities and orientation."

LGBTQ Tunisians face both legal and social discrimination. Reports of family rejection, violence in public spaces, violence within families and suicides are quite common.

== History ==
=== Background ===
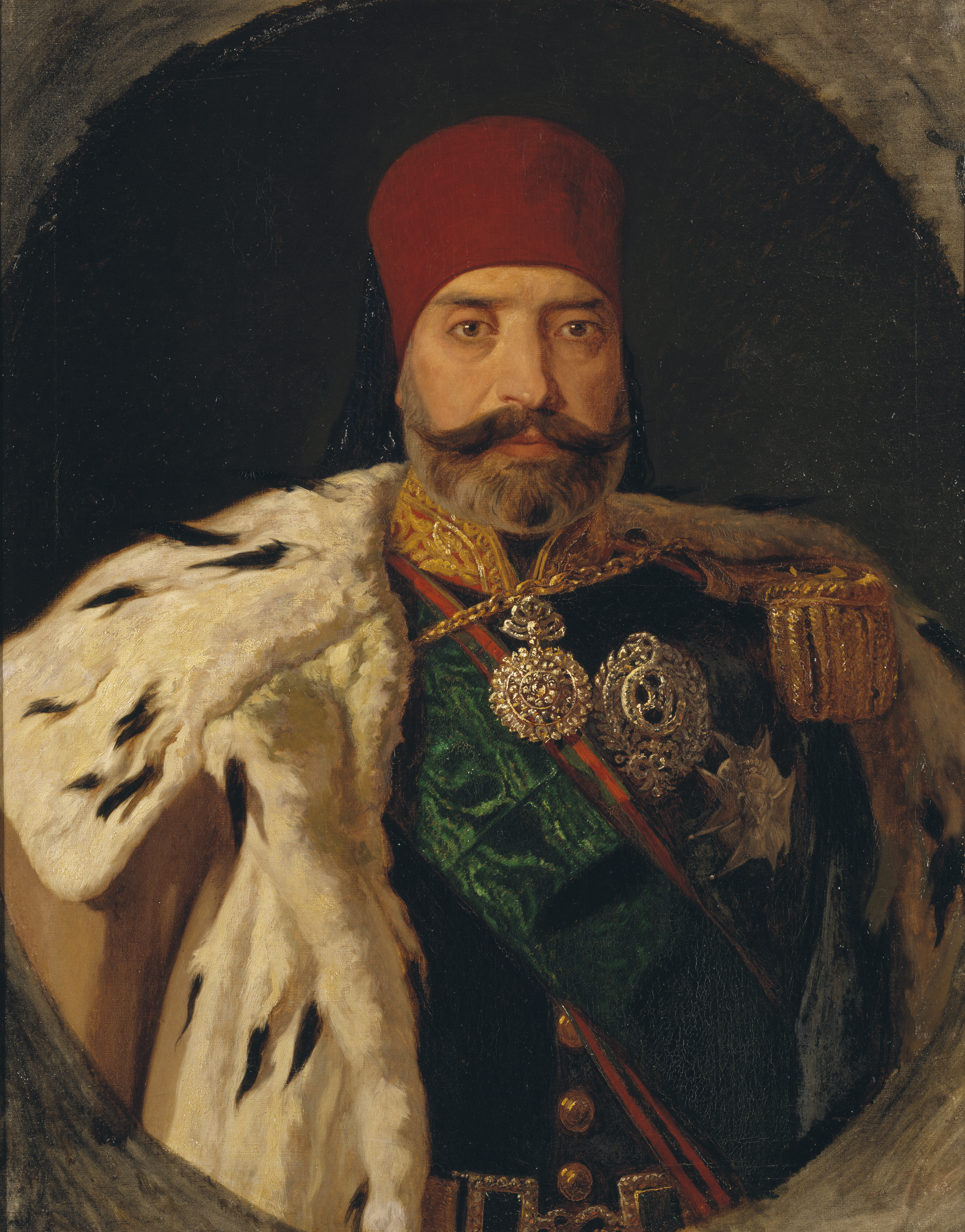
Muhammad III as-Sadiq (portrait), known as Sadok Bey and the Bey of Tunis from 1859 until his death in 1882, had a homosexual relationship with his vizier Mustapha Ben Ismaïl.

From the end of the 18th century to the beginning of the 20th century, despite facing ongoing stigmatization, gay men managed to have social roles in Tunisia similar to those in the rest of the Arab Muslim world. Specifically, they served as intermediaries between masculine and feminine spaces in wedding celebrations, were invited to men's homes in the presence of their wives, and were permitted to enter women's private spaces in a similar manner to blind people. Homosexual relationships were common in the Tunisian royal court and among the aristocratic families, particularly during the reign of the Hafsid dynasty (1229–1574) when, according to documentation, large numbers of "effeminate" men offered their companionship to court men, presenting themselves as singers and dancers. During the rule of the Husainid dynasty, Bey Muhammad III as-Sadiq was open about his intimate relationship with his vizier Mustapha Ben Ismaïl.

For the middle and poor classes, meetings took place in all possible private and public places, such as bathhouses, barber shops, zawiyas, but especially places accessible to travelers such as fondouks, hammams, and pensions. The traveler Jacques Philippe Laugier de Tassy described in his diary in 1725 that "sodomy is widely practiced among the Turks of Algiers, the Deys, the Beys and the principals give the example". Sodomy was prohibited in Tunisian society irrespective of whether it constituted part of homosexual or heterosexual activities. Indeed, for centuries it constituted one of the rare instances where Tunisian Muslim women had the right to request a divorce. According to popular culture, when a woman wanted to separate from a husband that had committed sodomy with her, she had to present herself to the qadi / judge and squat in his presence while putting her shoes on backward; this meant that the husband was seeing her in a reverse manner.

=== Criminalization of homosexuality ===
==== Before 1913 ====
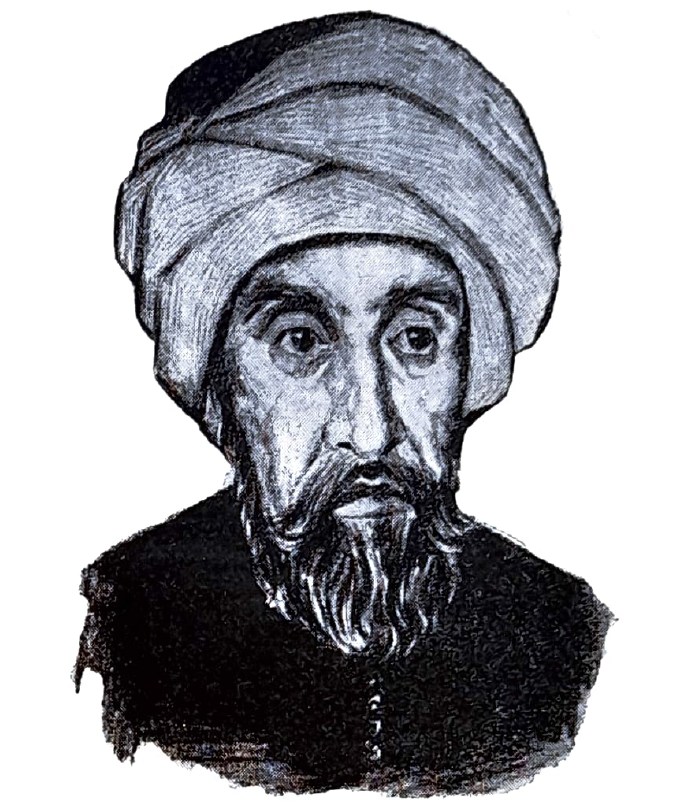
Prior to the introduction of the Penal Code of 1913, Tunisian Muslims were prosecuted for sodomy by Islamic courts that applied either the Maliki or Hanafi school of Islamic jurisprudence. The Hanafi school, founded by Abu Hanifa (sketch), was more lenient towards those accused of homosexuality.

Homosexuality, whether male or female, had always been considered a taboo that Tunisians avoided discussing openly. Despite this stigmatization, it has been argued that it was not homosexuality that was actively sought out and condemned by institutions and authorities, but the absence of consent between individuals in homosexual encounters. Historian Abdelhamid Larguèche argues in favour of this hypothesis, pointing out that among all the arrests which took place in Tunis between 1861 and 1865, only 62 of them were for "sodomy", and all of them were "rape cases[;] often involving minors".

For Tunisian Muslims, concerning regulation, homosexuality was governed in accordance to sharia law, with the judges in the country's different cities applying either the Maliki school (primarily used for native Tunisians) or the Hanafi school (primarily used for Tunisians of Turkish origin) of jurisprudence in their decisions. In both schools of thought, homosexuality was theoretically punished because it was classified as a form of disobedience to Allah's commandments (fasiq), but not as an act of apostasy (kafir).

In the Malikite school, homosexuality was punishable by stoning. One of the most important documentations of this rule in Tunisian Muslim society dates back to the 14th century in Handbook of Sidi Khalil, a book written by Egyptian jurist Khalil ibn Ishaq al-Jundi, and which is addressed to Muslims of the Malikite rite in general, but especially those of Africa. In the 43rd chapter entitled "Illicit Cohabitation, that is to say adultery, fornication and implicitly sodomy", the author describes illicit sexual acts which must be punished; sodomy is described as the "intentional act of an adult male, endowed with reason, who introduces... the head of the penis (or a part of the penis of equal length to the head) into the body parts of a person on which he has no legal right as recognized by the doctors of the law. [...] Pederasty or sodomy is the equivalent of illicit cohabitation and incurs the legal penalty [of] stoning". However, this type of punishment remained very theoretical and difficult to apply in real life as, according to Maliki jurisprudence, the act of sodomy had to be proven either through the confession of the accused four times and at four different times in the presence of a judge, or through the testimonies of four adult Muslim men, that were free and honest, and witnessed the same act, at the same time, and from the same place.

For the followers of the Hanafi school, the situation concerning sodomy was much more flexible and leniant, with judges having the freedom to choose between prison and flogging as punishment for those accused of sodomy. This was based on the declaration of Abu Hanifa, founder of this school, who stated that "if Allah had wanted to kill the luti [he who committed sodomy, liwat], he would have specified it".

==== After 1913 ====
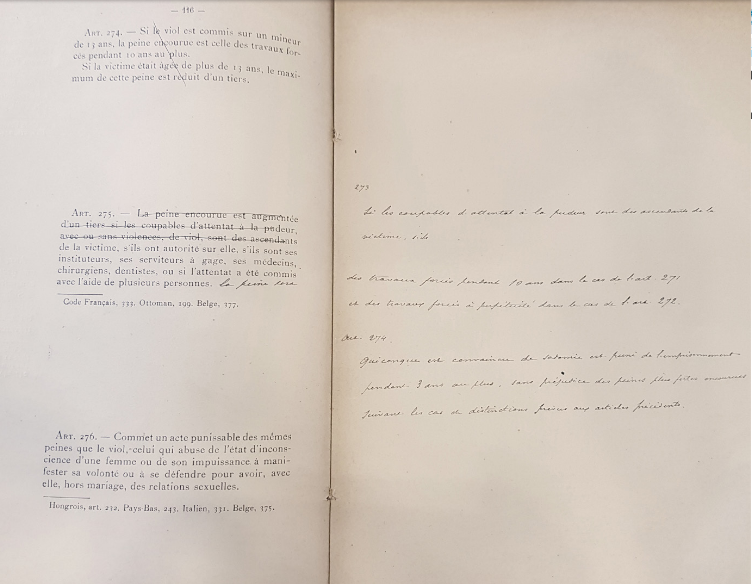
In the first draft of Tunisia's 1913 Penal Code—drafted and completed in 1911—no references are made to homosexuality in any of the printed articles. However, a handwritten note labelled as Article 274 that criminalized sodomy appears in the margins of the "Offenses against Decency" section (scan). By the time the Penal Code was published in 1913, this handwritten note had become law as Article 230.

Article 230, criminalizing homosexuality, first appeared in the Penal Code of 1913, which was inspired by the French Penal Code of 1810 in terms of both "structure" and "values"; despite this, the French Penal Code did not criminalize sodomy. This Article, among others, was the work of a commission created for the codification of Tunisian laws, by the Resident-General René Millet, in September 1896. This commission was made up of eight members, which by 1912 consisted of six Frenchmen and two Tunisians; Hanafi judge Mahmoud Ben Mahmoud, and Maliki judge Mohamed Kassar.

According to research in the national archives by Ramy Khouili and Daniel Levine-Spound, in the Preliminary Draft of the Tunisian Penal Code, drafted and completed in 1911, no reference is made to sodomy in any of the printed Articles. However, a sanction against sodomy does appear in the form of a handwritten note, in the margins of the section "Offenses against Decency", represented as Article 274; the note read that "whoever is convicted of sodomy is punishable by three years in prison, without prejudice to longer penalties incurred based on the cases and distinctions outlined in the preceding articles". Unlike several other proposals added, the one concerning Article 274 is not accompanied by a signature or explanation that could help identify the person who proposed it. Moreover, although the 1911 Preliminary Draft often included footnotes referencing the legal sources of specific Articles, as Article 274 was a handwritten note, it lacked such a legal source.

In the 1912 version of the Preliminary Draft of the Penal Code, Article 274 became Article 212, due to the "Offenses against Decency" section appearing earlier in newer draft, having been typed rather than handwritten. In the final version of Penal Code from 1913, due to some reorganization, Article 274 became Article 230, with few changes, criminalizing homosexuality with up to three-year of imprisonment. In the Arabic version of the text, published shortly after the French version, "sodomy" was replaced with "Liwat" (male homosexuality) and "El Mousahaka" (female homosexuality).

== Legality of same-sex sexual activity ==
Article 230 of the Penal Code of 1913 (largely modified in 1964) decrees imprisonment of up to three years for private acts of sodomy between consenting adults. (Note: The official text of Article 230 in French (Jurisite Tunisie): La sodomie, si elle ne rentre dans aucun des cas prévus aux articles précédents, est punie de l'emprisonnement pendant trois ans.)

Cross-dressing is not expressly illegal, although transgender people, along with gay people, are often accused of violating Article 226 of the national Penal Code which outlaws "outrages against public decency".

On 7 December 2016, two Tunisian men were arrested on suspicion of homosexual activity in Sousse, "anally probed" and forced to sign confessions of having committed "sodomy". On 11 March 2017, while on bail, they were given eight-month prison sentences.

Local LGBTQ association Association Shams has reported that since the Tunisian revolution in 2011, an increasing number of gay men have been being jailed: 127 in 2018, in contrast to 79 in 2017, and 56 in 2016. As of April 2019, at least 22 arrests had been made so far in 2019.

On 6 July 2020, Human Rights Watch said that a Tunisian court sentenced two men for homosexuality. Police arrested the two men on the suspicion of same-sex conduct on 3 June and attempted to subject the defendants to an anal exam, apparently to use as evidence in the case.

If the individual, accused of homosexuality, refused to be "anally probed", the authorities would view this refusal as evidence of guilt. In June 2017, a 16-year-old teen was sentenced to four months in jail for homosexuality after refusing to be "anally probed".

In September 2017, Minister Mehdi Ben Gharbia agreed to stop forced anal tests as proof of homosexuality. Ben Gharbia told Agence France-Presse that authorities could still perform anal tests on men suspected of being gay, but "these exams can no longer be imposed by force, physical or moral, or without the consent of the person concerned". Additionally, he said that Tunisia was "committed to protecting the sexual minority from any form of stigmatization, discrimination and violence", adding that "civil society must first be prepared" for such change in a Muslim country. However as of 2019, reports by local human rights and LGBTQ associations confirm that anal tests are still being ordered by courts to determine whether a suspect is gay or not throughout 2018 and 2019.

=== Decriminalization efforts ===
Association Shams has long advocated for the repeal of article 230. Several civil organizations, such as the Tunisian Association of Democratic Women, have also been pushing for its repeal.

In June 2012, Human Rights Minister Samir Dilou rejected the recommendation of the United Nations Human Rights Committee for Tunisia to decriminalize same-sex sexual acts, stating that the concept of "sexual orientation is specific to the West" and is overridden by Tunisian law, which "clearly describes Tunisia as an Arab Muslim country". In response, Amanullah De Sondy, Assistant Professor of Islamic Studies at the University of Miami said, "It appears that the minister is stating that Article 230 is about upholding Islam yet it is a French Colonial law that was imposed on Tunisia in 1913 and has nothing to do with Islam or Tunisian Arab traditions."

In 2014, a campaign was launched on Facebook to repeal the criminal laws used against LGBTQ people in Tunisia. A representative of this campaign expressed an interest to create a registered group in Tunisia to campaign for these legal reforms. Several NGOs in Tunisia, including the Tunisian Association of Democratic Women, asked the Government to repeal the criminal law against homosexuality.

In October 2015, Justice Minister Mohammed Saleh bin Aissa called for the abolition of Chapter 230 of the Penal Code, but was quickly rebuked by the President of Tunisia, Beji Caid Essebsi, who said, "This will not happen."

The international non-governmental organisation Human Rights Watch published a report in March 2016 urging the Tunisian Government to decriminalise consensual same-sex conduct and noting that the ongoing discrimination against gay men and men perceived to be homosexual were subject to grave human rights abuses "including beatings, forced anal examinations, and routine humiliating treatment." Much of the report was informed by the treatment of the "Kairouan Six", six students in Kairouan who were detained and punished under Article 230.

On 15 June 2018, the Individual Freedoms and Equality Committee (COLIBE), a presidential committee composed of legislators, professors and human rights advocates, recommended to President Beji Caid Essebsi the decriminalization of homosexuality in Tunisia. MP Bochra Belhaj Hmida told NBC News that the committee's recommendation regarding homosexuality "is the outright repeal of article 230." The committee did propose a second option, which is lowering the punishment to a fine of 500 dinars (around $200) and no risk of jail time. The committee wrote in its report: "The state and society have nothing to do with the sexual life amongst adults' … sexual orientations and choices of individuals are essential to private life."

The commission's proposal faces strong opposition from social conservatives, who claim it would "eradicate Tunisian identity" and have likened it to "intellectural [sic] terrorism".

== Recognition of same-sex relationships ==
The personal status code does not explicitly define marriage to be between a man and a woman, but it's implied according to its different article. Only that type of marriage is regulated. There is no law that regulates same-sex marriages or a civil unions. In 2020, Tunisian authorities approved the family reunification of a same-sex couple married abroad, a move initially reported as indirect recognition of the marriage, but the government repeated that it does not recognize same-sex marriages and the approval may have been an administrative oversight.

== Gender identity and expression ==
There is inconsistent legal recognition for transgender or gender non-conforming people. On 22 December 1993, the Court of Appeals in Tunis rejected a request from a trans woman to change her legal gender (statut civil) from male to female. The judgement from the Court declared that her gender change is a "voluntary and artificial operation" that does not justify a change in legal status. However, in 2018, a trans man succeeded in changing his legal status in a revolutionary judgement.

== LGBTQ civil society and culture ==
In 2015, Association Shams (Arabic: جمعية شمس) was formed as Tunisia's first LGBTQ rights organization. On 18 May 2015, Shams received official government recognition as an organization. On 10 December 2015, which is International Human Rights Day, Shams group joined with local activist groups to protest the ongoing discrimination against Tunisia's LGBTQ community.

A Facebook page campaigning for LGBTQ rights in Tunisia also has several thousand "likes". There are at least seven organised LGBTQ rights groups in Tunisia: Association Shams, Mawjoudin (Arabic: موجودين), Damj, Chouf, Kelmty, Alwani (Arabic: الواني), and Queer of the Bled.

In May 2016, several LGBTI associations organized a small, discreet gay pride reception in Tunis. Associations also organized events and public demonstrations to mark the International Day against Homophobia in May.

An online radio station catering to the LGBTQ community began broadcasting in December 2017, believed to be the first of its kind in the Arabic-speaking world.

=== Media ===
In March 2011, Tunisia's first online magazine for the country's LGBTQ community, Gayday Magazine, was launched. Running stories and interviews related to the country's community, the publications covers consisted on English and French titles. In 2012, Gayday was hacked, as homophobic hackers took over the publication's email, Twitter and Facebook accounts. These attacks took place at the height of an international campaign of which Gayday Magazine is a part, to raise awareness about the massacre of emo and gay people in Iraq.

Fadi Krouj is the editor-in-chief and creator of Gayday Magazine. Commenting on the International Day Against Homophobia, Transphobia and Biphobia in 2012, Fadi said: "The Tunisian LGBTQ community in Tunisia has started to mobilize and discreetly form its support-base. Reactions to the thus far mainly online activism were met with radical, homophobic statements from the current Minister of Human Rights, Samir Dilou. He described homosexuality as a mental illness that requires treatment and isolation, and described social values and traditions as red lines not to be crossed."

=== Film culture ===
A number of Tunisian films have addressed same-sex attraction: Man of Ashes (1986), Bedwin Hacker (2003), Fleur d'oubli (2005), The String (2010), Histoires tunisiennes (2011), and Upon the shadow (2017).

In January 2018, the Mawjoudin Queer Film Festival successfully took place. It was organized by the Mawjoudin association, and was the first ever film festival celebrating the LGBTQ community in Tunisia and all of North Africa. The second edition of the festival was held on 22–25 March 2019 in downtown Tunis.

=== Male prostitution ===
Male prostitution occurs in Tunisian tourist resorts. In 2013, Ronny De Smet, a Belgian tourist, was sentenced to three years in prison for attempted homosexual seduction in what he believes was a sting operation by local police to extort money. De Smet was released three months later.

== Politics ==
In 2019, ahead of the 2019 presidential election, lawyer and LGBTQ activist Mounir Baatour announced his candidacy for president, making him the first gay man to run for president in Tunisia and the Arab World.

== Public opinion ==
Should same-sex marriage be legal? (2014)
1. Yes (18.0%)
2. Against (61.0%)
3. Don't know (21.0%)
Should homosexuals be punished? (Elka Consulting, 2016)
1. Yes (64.5%)
2. No (10.9%)
3. Don't know (24.6%)

Public opinion regarding LGBTQ right is complex. According to a 2014 poll by the ILGA, 18% of Tunisian people were in favor of legalizing same-sex marriage, with 61% opposed.

During a television interview in February 2012, Minister for Human Rights Samir Dilou stated that "freedom of speech has its limits", homosexuality is "a perversion", and gay people needed to be "treated medically". His comments were condemned by some in Tunisian society who posted pro-LGBTQ pictures on social networking sites.

An opinion poll conducted by Elka Consulting in 2016 showed that 64.5% of Tunisians believed that "homosexuals should be punished", while 10.9% said "homosexuals should not be punished".

== Summary table ==
	Yes/No	Notes
Same-sex sexual activity
Same-sex sexual activity legal	No	Penalty: Up to 3 years’ imprisonment (Legalization proposed)
Equal age of consent	Yes	
Discrimination laws
Anti-discrimination laws in employment only	No	
Anti-discrimination laws in the provision of goods and services	No	
Anti-discrimination laws in all other areas (incl. indirect discrimination, hate speech)	No	
Same-sex unions
Same-sex marriages	No	
Civil partnerships	No	
Recognition of same-sex couples	No	
Adoption and children
Adoption by individuals	No	
Stepchild adoption by same-sex couples	No	
Joint adoption by same-sex couples	No	
Commercial surrogacy for gay male couples	No	
Access to IVF for lesbians	No	
Other
LGBTQ people allowed to serve openly in the military		
Right to change legal gender	No	
MSMs allowed to donate blood	Yes	

== See also ==
- Human rights in Tunisia
- LGBTQ rights in Africa
- Politics of Tunisia
