= Beyond the Frontlines: Resistance and Resilience in Palestine =

- Directed by: Alexandra Dols
- Produced by: Hybrid Pulse
- Starring: Samah Jabr
- Edited by: Delphine Piau Véronique Rosa
- Music by: Baraka
- Release date: November 8, 2017
- Running time: 113 minutes
- Country: France
- Language: English

Beyond the Frontlines: Resistance and Resilience in Palestine (Original French title: Derrière les fronts : Résistances et résiliences en Palestine) is a 2017 documentary film written, directed and produced by French director Alexandra Dols. Featuring Palestinian women and men, among others psychiatrist and writer Samah Jabr, it looks at the consequences of the Israeli occupation on the mental health of the Palestinian people, issues of colonial trauma and alienation and disalienation. It won the Sunbird Award for Best Documentary Film at the Days of Cinema film festival in Palestine.

== Synopsis ==
Beyond the Frontlines: Resistance and Resilience in Palestine (a.k.a. Beyond the Frontlines: Tales of Resistance and Resilience from Palestine) is based on a selection of Samah Jabr’s columns. Excerpts are read by the author and give its structure to the film, which presents a collection of interviews, as well as archive and original footage. Following Jabr’s angle that "the Israeli occupation is not only a political issue, but indeed a mental health problem", the film is an exploration of the ways in which Palestinian women and men experience both the outward and inward effects of this occupation. For, according to Dols, “everyday colonization does not only involve occupying land, homes, the sky or water. It does not seek to impose its rule through weapons only; it molds the minds as well, beyond the frontlines.”

The interviewees represent a wide range of identities, religions, sexual orientations, political cultures, social backgrounds and geographical origins. This diversity is presented by director Alexandra Dols as a political stand. According to Jabr, “the film does not turn away from people who are labeled ‘controversial’ and thus to be avoided and ignored… The interviewees differ ideologically among themselves yet are reunited in their striving for liberation”.

== Production and release ==
Alexandra Dols came across Samah Jabr’s writings after completing her first feature documentary, Moudjahidate, in which she explored Algerian women’s activism for the independence within the National Liberation Front. Jabr’s perspective on the Israeli-Palestinian conflict is inspired by anticolonial psychiatrist Frantz Fanon’s analysis that national liberation may not occur without the decolonization of minds as well.

After reading one of her columns in 2012, Dols contacted Jabr, who took some time to reflect on her proposition and finally agreed to participate in her documentary in 2013. Filmed in Palestine between summer 2013 and December 2015, Beyond the Frontlines was partly financed through a crowdfunding campaign, and supported by a number of French human rights, including feminist, organizations.

Beyond the Frontlines was released theatrically in France on November 8th, 2017. It has toured nationally and internationally since, and is regularly selected by festivals. It won the Sunbird Award for Best Documentary Film at the Days of Cinema film festival in Nablus, Palestine, in October 2017. The film was released to DVD one year later on November 26th, 2018, containing outtakes and an interview of director Dols by her main character Jabr.

Shortly after the release of the film, an eponymous book was published. Derrière les fronts. Chroniques d'une psychiatre psychothérapeute palestinienne sous occupation [Beyond the Frontlines. Tales by a Palestinian psychiatrist and psychotherapist under occupation] (PMN Éditions and Hybrid Pulse, 2018) presents a selection of Jabr's columns translated into French.

== Critical reception ==
Beyond the Frontlines has received positive reviews both from the independent film industry and the global mental health community. British director Ken Loach asked potential audiences to “please see this film”. When handing the film its Sunbird Award, Palestinian actor, director and producer George Khleifi labelled it “an important and timely film” and “excellently documented”. In its review, psychoanalyst and co-founder of the UK-Palestine Mental Health Network Martin Kemp underlined that “one of the film’s strengths is that while it focuses on Palestine, it also speaks to us of universal themes”.

The French media, from national newspapers and cultural magazines to socially-aware publications, also gave the film positive reviews.

== Festival selections ==
Beyond the Frontlines has been selected for and screened at film festivals in France and Europe, the Arab world, Latin America and the United States. These festivals focus on various aspects of the Israeli-Palestinian conflict, issues of global human rights as well as gender equality, just like the Tunisian Mawjoudin Queer Film Festival and Chouftouhonna Festival.
