= Association Shams =

Tunisian LGBT rights organization

Association Shams Tunisia logo

Association Shams (Arabic: جمعية شمس, romanized: Jamʿiyyat Shams) is a Tunisian organization for LGBT rights, campaigning for sexual minority rights in Tunisia. The non-governmental, non-profit organization derives its name from the Sufi mystic Shams Tabrizi (with shams also being Arabic for "sun") and its logo is made up of two whirling dervishes.

== Foundation and activities ==
Association Shams was legally registered under Tunisian law on May 18, 2015. The focus of the organization is the decriminalization of homosexuality. On their website, they published a set of other goals such as:

- Raising awareness about sexually transmitted diseases
- Mentoring and supporting sexual minorities around the country by providing financial, emotional and psychological help.
- Defending the rights of minorities and providing a safe environment regardless of their sexual orientation or gender difference.

The organization is known for campaigns attracting media attention for LGBTQ issues in Tunisia and is considered one of the first legally recognized LGBTQ advocacy groups in the Arabic speaking world.

In the wake of the Arab Spring, Tunisian LGBT activists, according to interviews conducted by Acconcia, Giuseppe, Et al, published in the journal, Social Movement Studies, said that they took advantage of the "wider space for LGBTQ activism {that} was {becoming} evident" as a result of the "uprisings" and formed groups like Shams, Mawjoudin, and Chouf.

In 2017, Radio Shams, an independent, LGBTQ led media operation; another first in the Arab World, was created, with the goal to help give LGBTQ voices in Tunisia a platform to advocate for their rights. The founder is quoted as stating that he, and by extension the association had, "received more than five thousand death threats" within the first two weeks of the commencement of the operation of the radio station. In the station's first six months they had 10,000 listeners a week across 15 different countries. The show is streamed online six days a week. The project is funded by the Dutch embassy in Tunis. According to the founder, and other public facing members of the association, like presenter and activist Amina Sboui, the Shams Rad location is kept secret, for the safety of the station's volunteers and presenters.

Radio Shams, sometimes written as "Shams Rad" is amongst a series of disconnected, post Arab Spring associative media ventures, whose spoken goals are to give voice to various marginalized regions or people in Tunisia, that are often ignored by the national media, which, in the case of Association Shams and Radio Shams, primarily the voices of the LGBTQ and sexual minorities community in Tunisia.

== Controversy and criticism ==
=== Legal challenges against the organization ===
The existence of Association Shams has been received with skepticism by Tunisians. Several public figures were opposed to the existence of an LGBTQ activist group in the country. Homosexuality is still criminalized under Tunisian law. As stated by the Article 230 of the Tunisian Penal code, homosexuality is a punishable crime and people accused of it can face up to three years in prison. The authorities accuse people with sodomy without proper evidence and oblige them to undergo anal tests that have no medical relevance.

In December 2015, a controversy took place in several local media outlets and following that a case was filed against the organization by Kamel Hedhili, the head of state litigation. The government stated that Shams is violating the association law of the country and that it deviated from its main course. The activities of the NGO were suspended for a whole month starting from January 4, 2016, by a decree of the Tunisian Court of First Instance.

Despite the reversal of the initial suspension given to Shams, by the Court of First Instance, the Association continued to be targeted with legal attacks, by Tunisian State Litigator, Kamel Hedhili. In 2019, Hedhili, filed an appeal against the ruling reversing the initial suspension of Association Shams; again, citing Article 230 of the Tunisian penal code.

This case continued until February 2020, when Tunisia's Court of Cassation ruled in favor of Association Shams and granted the group permanent legal protection.

=== Controversy regarding the organization's founders ===
One of the founders and leading LGBT activists of the organization, Ahmed Ben Amor, faced harassments and death threats upon openly sharing his views and campaigning for the NGO on Tunisian TV in 2016. Following the controversy, in 2017, supermarkets and public spaces banned the entrance of homosexuals to their premises. The sign "No Homosexuals allowed" showed up in different neighborhoods around the capital city Tunis.

In 2019, Mounir Baatour, the head of the organization, was the candidate of the Tunisian Liberal Party for the 2019 Tunisian presidential election and was reported as the first openly gay presidential candidate in Tunisia by media outlets like NBC, The Independent, Raseef22, Daraj Media and Vice, but was excluded from running, because he had been sentenced to prison for sexual abuse of a minor in 2013.

Also in 2019, Baatour faced prosecution by the Tunisian government for allegedly violating several laws, including, article 14 of the country's 2015 counterterrorism law, article 9 of the law criminalizing racial discrimination, and article 52 of the law regarding freedom of the press. The Tunisian authorities argue that the charges against Baatour are in reference to social media posts he disseminated in which disparaging comments regarding Muhammad and Islam were made.

In January 2020, Human Rights Watch published an article demanding that the Tunisian government cease its prosecution efforts against Baatour regarding his comments that were considered offensive to Islam. The HRW argued that Baatour's comments did not rise to the level to be considered incitement to racial hatred under the Tunisian law that is being used to prosecute him.

In 2020, Baatour claimed that Tunisian authorities had recognized the existing same-sex marriage of a Tunisian and French man, and several Western (queer) media reported about it. Tunisian officials clarified that this was not the case.

=== Criticism by other LGBT groups in Tunisia and the Arabic-speaking world ===
In 2018, three other LGBT groups in Tunisia, Mawjoudin, Damj and Chouf, released a common declaration asking for the boycott of Shams. According to them, Mounir Baatour, the head of the organization, had publicly exposed the sexual orientation of LGBTQ people, faced accusations of sexual harassment and was supportive of the Israeli Occupation of Palestine.

In 2019, Mawjoudin asked Baatour to resign from his presidential candidacy, repeating claims of sexual harassment against him. Baatour allegedly promised homeless gay minors shelter and then sexually harassed them. Baatour himself denies the allegations, citing that his alleged victims of abuse could sue him in case this was true. My.Kali magazine criticized that media reports about Baatour's presidency often failed to mention his 2013 imprisonment for sexual abuse, failed to give space to other LGBT groups in Tunisia in their reporting and that media reports mentioning his support for Israel contributed to stereotypes in the Arabic-speaking world that LGBT people were supporters of Zionism.
