= The Jenin Horse =

Dismantled statue in Jenin, Palestine

- حصان جنين
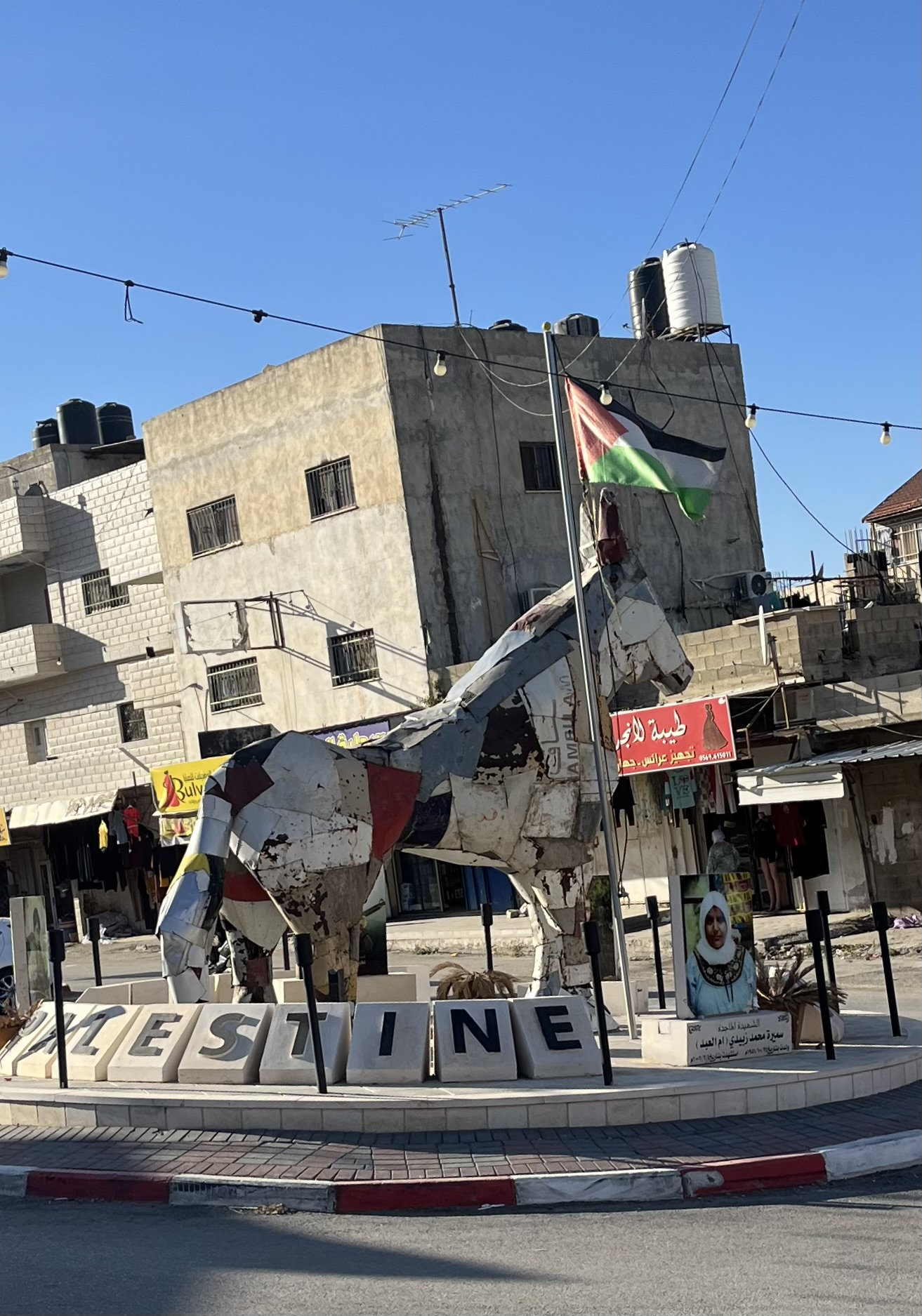
- The statue in September 2023
- Interactive map of The Jenin Horse
- Location: Jenin, West Bank, Palestine
- Coordinates: 32°27′39″N 35°17′32″E
- Designer: Thomas Kilpper
- Height: 16 ft (4.9 m)
- Beginning date: June 2003
- Dismantled date: 29 October 2023

The Jenin Horse (Arabic: حصان جنين), also known by the Arabic name Al-Hissan (The Horse), was a sculpture built in 2003 in Jenin, Palestine, out of metal salvaged from areas destroyed in the Second Intifada. Sponsored by the Goethe-Institut in Ramallah, the sculpture was designed by German artist Thomas Kilpper, who assembled it with the assistance of local youth. Part of the horse came from a Palestine Red Crescent Society (PRCS) ambulance which had been attacked by the Israel Defense Forces (IDF) in March 2002, killing doctor Khalil Suleiman. The sculpture was installed in a roundabout at the entrance of the Jenin refugee camp, where it stood for 20 years.

IDF incursions and clashes with Palestinian armed groups in Jenin increased in 2022 and 2023, particularly after the October 7 attacks. In the first few months of the Gaza war, the horse and other monuments in Jenin were dismantled by the IDF. The sculpture is memorialized in The Horse of Jenin, a one-man show by Palestinian actor and comedian Alaa Shehada.

== History ==
=== Construction ===
In June 2003, German artist Thomas Kilpper traveled to Jenin to create an art project at the invitation of the Goethe-Institut in Ramallah. While Kilpper was there, the Second Intifada was ongoing, and the IDF regularly conducted raids and enforced days-long curfews in Jenin. In the previous year, during Operation Defensive Shield, at least 52 Palestinians had been killed and large areas had been bulldozed by the IDF in the Battle of Jenin.

Kilpper, who creates site-specific public art, wanted to build a piece that "reclaimed public space". He planned to build a horse, a symbol of freedom in Arab culture, out of materials salvaged from the damage in Jenin. The project was a collaboration between Kilpper and local residents. Kilpper and a group of teenagers gathered scrap metal from wrecked buildings and vehicles. They worked with a welder to connect the metal panels of various colors and attach them to the skeleton they built from salvaged rods. At the teens' suggestion, the horse incorporated part of a Palestine Red Crescent Society (PRCS) ambulance that had been attacked by the IDF in March 2002. The strike had killed doctor Khalil Suleiman, head of the local PRCS branch, while he was responding to an emergency call. The IDF stated that they attacked the ambulance because it drove towards them without stopping.

The Jenin Horse was 5 meters (16 feet) tall. Israeli journalist Amira Hass described the sculpture as resembling a mule more than a horse. After the sculpture was completed, its final location was disputed for several weeks, with the Al-Aqsa Martyrs' Brigade advocating for it to be installed in the Jenin refugee camp. In the meantime, Kilpper decided to attempt transporting the sculpture across the West Bank as a protest against Israeli checkpoints. On 12 July, Kilpper and four of the teenagers accompanied the Jenin Horse as it was towed by tractor to Ramallah. Over the course of their approximately 90 km (56 mi) journey, they passed through multiple checkpoints, facing several delays due to travel permits and other issues. They arrived in Ramallah after 11 hours of travel.

Kilpper documented the project, which he called Al Hissan – The Jenin Horse: Art in Public Space Under Conditions of Occupation, in writing and video.

=== Use ===
The statue was installed in a plaza, which became known as the Horse Roundabout, at the entrance of the Jenin refugee camp and across from the Jenin Government Hospital. It was positioned to face Haifa, Israel, from which many of the residents' families were displaced in 1948. The roundabout was used to display photos of recently deceased people and as a place for youth to socialize and play football.

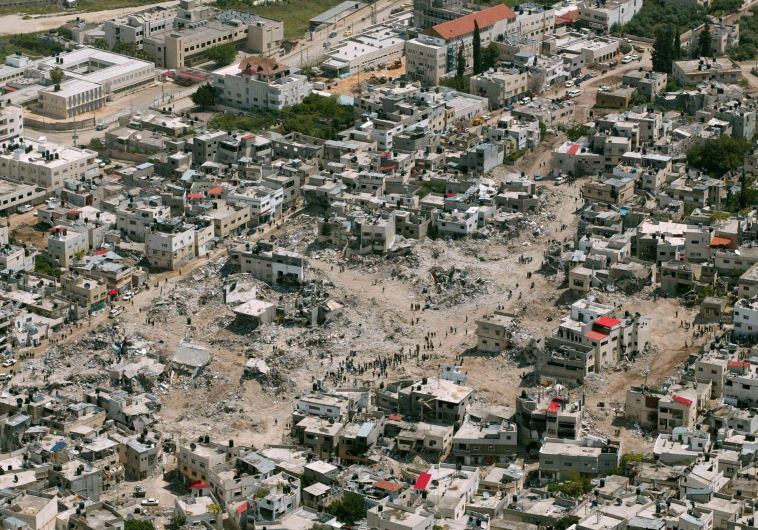
View of Jenin refugee camp after the Battle of Jenin in 2002

The Jenin Horse has been described as a monument to sumud, the Palestinian cultural value of steadfastness, and a memorial to the Palestinians who were killed in the Battle of Jenin. The horse has also been interpreted as a symbol of Palestinian resistance and right of return. One journalist from The Guardian said the horse represented rebirth after destruction. Palestinian psychiatrist Samah Jabr compared the Jenin Horse to Marco Cavallo, a horse statue made by psychiatric patients in Italy in 1973, stating that these artworks reflect the use of symbolism and collective memory to cope with traumatic experiences. According to Al-Araby al-Jadeed, some Israeli media viewed the Jenin Horse as a symbol of terrorism.

=== Dismantling ===
The statue stood for 20 years. By April 2023, IDF raids and clashes with armed groups in the Jenin refugee camp had increased, killing around 50 Palestinians over the course of a year. The IDF's July 2023 incursions killed an additional 12 people. After the October 7 attacks, the IDF raised the frequency and intensity of its raids in the West Bank, including Jenin.

On 29 October 2023, the Jenin Horse was removed and carried away in a backhoe to an unknown destination by the IDF. In the same raid, the IDF destroyed the arched entryway to the refugee camp and killed four Palestinians, including one whom they said founded the Jenin Brigades. Kilpper called the removal of the horse "outrageous" and said that he felt "terribly powerless in the face of the scale of destruction." By December, the IDF had demolished multiple monuments in Jenin. The International Crisis Group called the destruction "gratuitous". Some Palestinians, including the Ministry of Culture, have accused Israel of destroying the monuments in an attempt to erase Palestinian culture and identity.

== Depiction in media ==
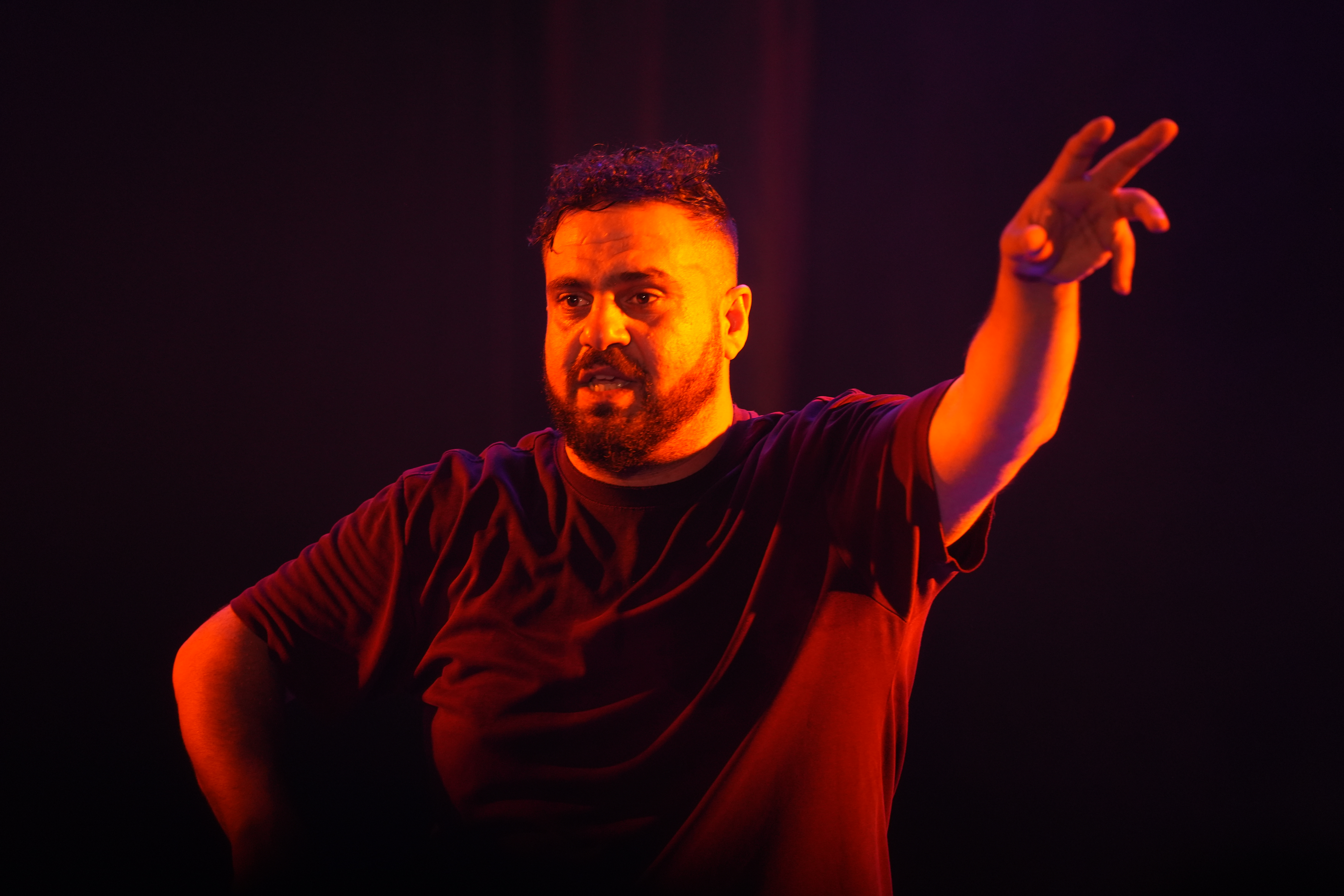
Alaa Shehada performing The Horse of Jenin at 2026 Edinburgh Festival Fringe

The Jenin Horse is mentioned in Anne Champion's 2016 poem "The Book of Sumud" published in the Prairie Schooner. Images inspired by the sculpture have been used in protests against the Gaza War, including in a quilt displayed on the steps of the Metropolitan Museum of Art in New York City.

Alaa Shehada, a Palestinian actor and comedian, created a solo show called The Horse of Jenin. He began writing it soon after the sculpture was dismantled. The show, a black comedy, is a collection of vignettes from Shehada's life in Israeli-occupied Jenin, including scenes from the Second Intifada, his memories of the Jenin Horse, and the IDF's killing of his childhood best friend. It ends with the statue's removal by the IDF. He has performed the show since 2024 in various locations, including Amsterdam's Paradiso, London's Bush Theatre, New York's Under the Radar Festival, and the Edinburgh Festival Fringe. It received positive reviews from Financial Times, The Guardian, and The Scotsman.

== See also ==
- Destruction of cultural heritage during the Gaza war
