= Mounir Baatour =

Tunisian LGBT rights activist

- منير بعتور
- Born: 1970 (age 55–56); Tunisia
- Occupation: Lawyer
- Known for: LGBT advocacy, first openly gay presidential candidate in the Arab world

Mounir Baatour (Arabic: منير بعتور, born 1970) is a Tunisian lawyer and LGBT activist. He is the founder of the LGBT organisation Association Shams, leader of the Tunisian Liberal Party, and was the first openly gay presidential candidate in the Arab world.

== LGBT activism and presidential campaign ==
Baatour was arrested in 2013 and jailed for 3 months. He claims that the charges were for sodomy and he denied them. Other sources say he was imprisoned for sexual abuse of a minor. According to Afrik.com, the Sheraton hotel is suspected of collaborating with the authorities and may have informed the police of the presence of Baatour with another man in one of their hotel room.

In 2015, Baatour co-founded Association Shams, an LGBT rights association focused on the decriminalisation of homosexuality. He is currently president of the association. In 2018, together with Alice Nkom, Baatour received the Idaho France prize for freedom, for his fight against homophobia.

On 8 August 2019, Baatour announced his participation to the Tunisian presidential election. Following this announcement, an estimated 650 articles from 120 countries were written about him, and Baatour built a campaign team with 300 local activists. His political program included the repeal of Article 230, which outlaws homosexuality, from the Tunisian criminal code, as well as gender equality and the protection of the rights of minorities. However, despite collecting nearly double the 10,000 signatures required for his nomination eligibility, the election authority rejected his candidacy, citing the sexual abuse case against him from 2013.

After receiving death threats from Islamists, Baatour fled to France in January 2020, where he was accepted as a political refugee.

Baatour lives in Marseille where he practices as a lawyer at the Marseille bar. On December 20, 2022, Baatour married in Marseille with the man he was arrested with in Tunisia ten years earlier.

== Criticism by other LGBT activists ==
In 2018, three other LGBT groups in Tunisia, Mawjoudin, Damj and Chouf, released a common declaration asking for the boycott of Shams. According to them, Baatour had publicly exposed the sexual orientation of LGBT people, faced accusations of sexual harassment and was supportive of the Israeli Occupation of Palestine.

In 2019, Mawjoudin asked Baatour to resign from his presidential candidacy, repeating claims of sexual harassment against him. Baatour allegedly promised homeless gay minors shelter and then sexually harassed them. Baatour himself denies the allegations, citing that his alleged victims of abuse could sue him in case this was true. My.Kali magazine criticized that media reports about Baatour's presidency often failed to mention his 2013 imprisonment for sexual abuse, failed to give space to other LGBT groups in Tunisia in their reporting and that media reports mentioning his support for Israel contributed to stereotypes in the Arabic-speaking world that LGBT people were supporters of Zionism.

== See also ==
- LGBT rights in Tunisia
- 2019 Tunisian presidential election
