= Chouf Minorities =

Tunisian non-governmental organization

- Founded: 2012
- Type: NGO
- Purpose: advocates for the bodily and sexual integrity for women
- Headquarters: Tunis
- Region served: Tunisia

Chouf Minorities, also known as Chouf (Arabic: جمعية شوف), is a Tunisian non-governmental organization that advocates for the personal rights of Tunisian people who identify as women and of the LBT (lesbian, bisexual and trans) community in general.

== Foundation and goals ==
The organisation was first created in 2012 and registered abroad in 2013 "because it was impossible to register in Tunisia as an NGO advocating for LGBT+ rights". It was officially recognized in the country in 2015.

The organisation defines itself as a collective of activists that use audiovisual tools to give Tunisian female identifying people, and most specifically WSW women, to have a space for speaking and contributing. It has a non-hierarchical and feminist structure.

== Activities ==
=== Advocacy and mobilization ===
Engaged in the advocacy for women's rights and that of the LGBT community, the organisation participated in the drafting of the report of the Tunisian Individual Freedoms and Equality Committee (Colibe) along with other Tunisian organisations.

Chouf Minorities is conducting an in depth study, in partnership with Mawjoudin and Damj, on the systematic violations of the rights of LGBTQI + people in Tunisia.

In an open letter co-signed with several organizations and grouped under the name Collective for individual freedoms, the organisation urged directly President of Tunisia to ensure personal rights for people during Ramadan. On 17 May 2018, on the occasion of the International Day Against Homophobia and Transphobia, the collective called for the end of the use of anal tests and for the decriminalisation of homosexuality. At the end of the report produced by COLIBE, the collective took a public stance for the abrogation of the capital punishment, of the articles 230, 231 and 236 of the penal code.

The NGO is also known for its deep engagement in the campaigns against AIDS.

Chouf Minorities, in partnership with the organisation Chaml, organised an awareness and advocacy campaign denouncing street harassment with a video mobilising sixty Tunisian women, including some public figures (such as Lina Ben Mhenni, Amina Chebli and Bochra Belhaj Hmida). Chouf also participates in a campaign against the stereotypes around bisexuality with other organisations.

=== Chouftouhonna Festival ===
Every year, the Chouf minorities association organises a feminist art festival in Tunis, called Chouftouhonna. The festival allows for a space for artistic expression for women to claim their rights through a multidisciplinary program. For its 4th edition, in September 2018, Chouf Minorities invited more than 150 female artists to the National Theatre of Tunisia, in the Medina of Tunis.

=== Self defence courses ===
Chouf Minorities offers feminist self-defense courses. The certified martial arts coach conducts these workshops every week in downtown Tunis. This activity aims to enable women victims of violence not to be powerless in the face of assaults.
