= Upon the Shadow =

- Film poster
- Arabic: في الظل
- Directed by: Nada Mezni Hafaiedh
- Starring: Amina Sboui; Sandra Neifer; Ramy Ayari; Atef Pucci; Ayoub Moumene
- Release date: March 2017 (Thessaloniki Documentary Festival)
- Running time: 80 minutes
- Countries: Tunisia; France
- Language: Arabic

Upon the Shadow (Arabic: في الظل) is a French-Tunisian documentary directed by Nada Mezni Hafaiedh in 2017. The film discusses the topic of discrimination based on sexual orientation and gender identity in Tunisia.

The film premiered at the 2017 Thessaloniki Documentary Festival.

== Synopsis ==
Amina Sboui is a human rights activist surrounded by her friends who are people rejected by their families because of their sexual orientations and gender identities and whom she shelters at home. In the village of Sidi Bou Said, she discovers the challenges that the LGBTQI+ community faces in Tunisia in its struggle against the discrimination based on sexual orientation and sexual identity.

== Cast ==
- Amina Sboui
- Sandra Neifer
- Ramy Ayari
- Atef Pucci
- Ayoub Moumene

== Reception ==
The film won the Bronze Tanit during the Carthage Film Festival for the year of 2017 in the "Documentary feature films" category.

== See also ==
- LGBT rights in Tunisia
