= The Horse of Jenin =

Solo show

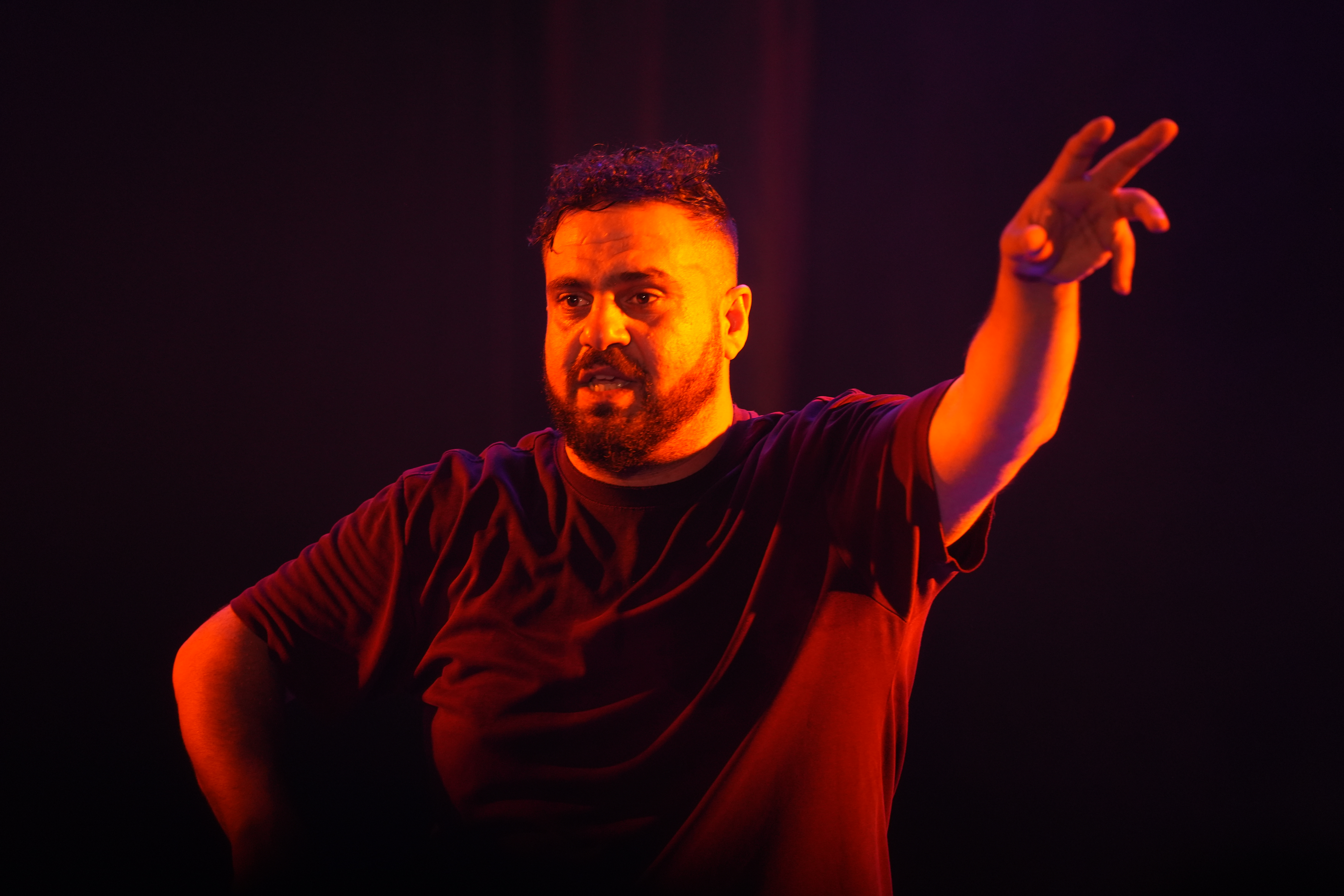
- Alaa Shehada performing The Horse of Jenin at 2026 Edinburgh Festival Fringe
- Written by: Alaa Shehada
- Music by: Remy van Kesteren, Khalil Al Batran
- Subject: life in Israeli-occupied Jenin
- Genre: black comedy, solo show

Premiere
- Date: October 28, 2024
- Place: Paradiso, Amsterdam, The Netherlands
- Directed by: Katrien van Beurden, Thomas van Ouwerkerk
- alaashehada.com/past-shows/the-horse-of-jenin

The Horse of Jenin is a solo show written and performed by Alaa Shehada and directed by Katrien van Beurden and Thomas van Ouwerkerk. Originally produced and performed through Troupe Courage in Amsterdam, the show mixes mime, masks, and standup to recount Shehada's childhood and his memories surrounding the Horse of Jenin. It has since toured at Edinburgh Fringe and La MaMa.

== History ==
In 2011, Alaa Shehada connected to Troupe Courage through their mask workshop at The Freedom Theatre in Jenin and subsequently became a company member.

The Horse of Jenin was created by Shehada at Troupe Courage in 2024. It premiered 28 October 2024 at the Paradiso in Amsterdam. It premiered in the US at La MaMa in January 2025 as part of the Under The Radar Festival, and in August 2025, it had a sold-out run at Edinburgh Fringe, where it played at Pleasance Theatre.

Originally planned to run for a seven-city tour in the US from November 2025 to early 2026, Shehada was denied entry into the US in November. The show was instead screened in New York, Seattle, Washington DC, and San Francisco in partnership with several of the original presenting theaters.

In August 2026, Shehada returned to the Pleasance Theatre for a second Edinburgh Fringe run following the success of the first.

== Crew ==
- Performer/Writer: Alaa Shehada
- Director: Katrien van Beurden, Thomas van Ouwerkerk
- Stand-up comedy guidance & co-writer: Sam Beale
- Masks: Den Durand
- Music: Remy van Kesteren, Khalil Al Batran
- Dramaturgy: Maarten Bos
- Lighting design/technology: Roderick Bredenoord

== Critical reception ==
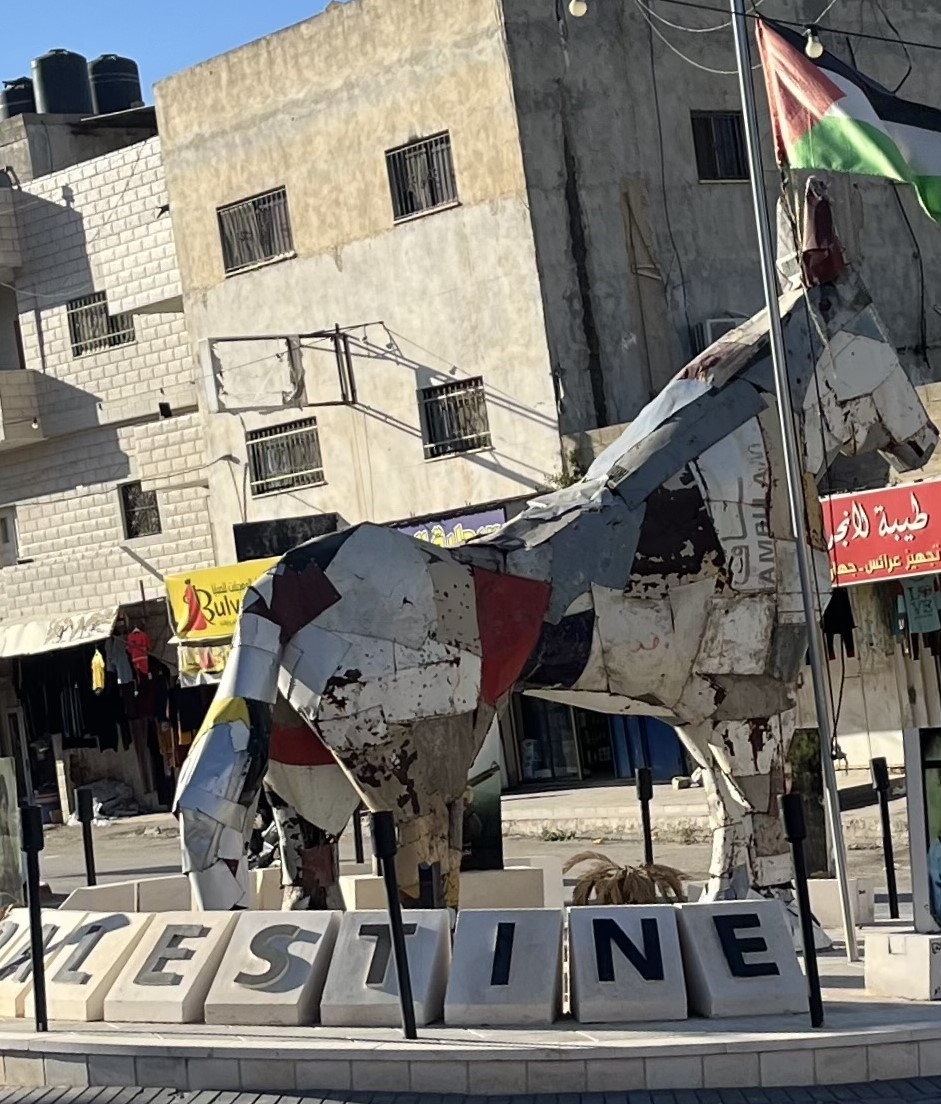
The Jenin Horse, September 2023

The Guardian gave The Horse of Jenin five stars in its Edinburgh Fringe review, lauding its "deeply moving" portrayal of friendship and its deft juggling of humor amidst horror to build a "gut-punch" of a story.

Rolling Stone places it on its Top 10 list of 2025 Fringe shows, calling it, "masterful storytelling" and "heart-swelling".

The Scotsman awarded it a Fringe First, noting, "The Horse of Jenin is a terrific tale of Palestinian life, laughter and tragedy under unimaginable pressure, and of human lives given a moment of shape and meaning by a fine piece of art."

The New York Times noted its "tender tribute" to Shehada's friendship and "intimate effect".

The Financial Times gave it four out of five stars, calling it a, "smart, funny, skilful show" that "[celebrates] the spirit of ordinary people".

== U.S. tour complications ==
Following its success at Edinburgh Fringe, The Horse of Jenin was booked for a seven-city tour in the United States. According the statement by David Muse, Artistic Director at Studio Theater:

"...in November, despite having a valid O-1B visa granted to individuals recognized for their extraordinary ability in the arts, Alaa was detained on his way into the US, held for over 24 hours, denied entry, and sent back to his residence in Amsterdam. Since then, the United States has banned entry for any individual traveling with Palestinian Authority documentation, shutting down any remaining hope that we could host Alaa’s production. Never in Studio’s history has politics prevented us from sharing the work of an artist we believe in."

The show was instead screened in partnership with New York Theatre Workshop, PlayCo, and 55B Productions (New York), Studio Theatre and the Laboratory for Global Performance & Politics (DC), Golden Thread Productions and Crowded Fire Theater (San Francisco), and Dunya Productions and Donkeysaddle Projects (Seattle).
