= Mawjoudin =

- Mawjoudin Initiative for Equality
- موجودين
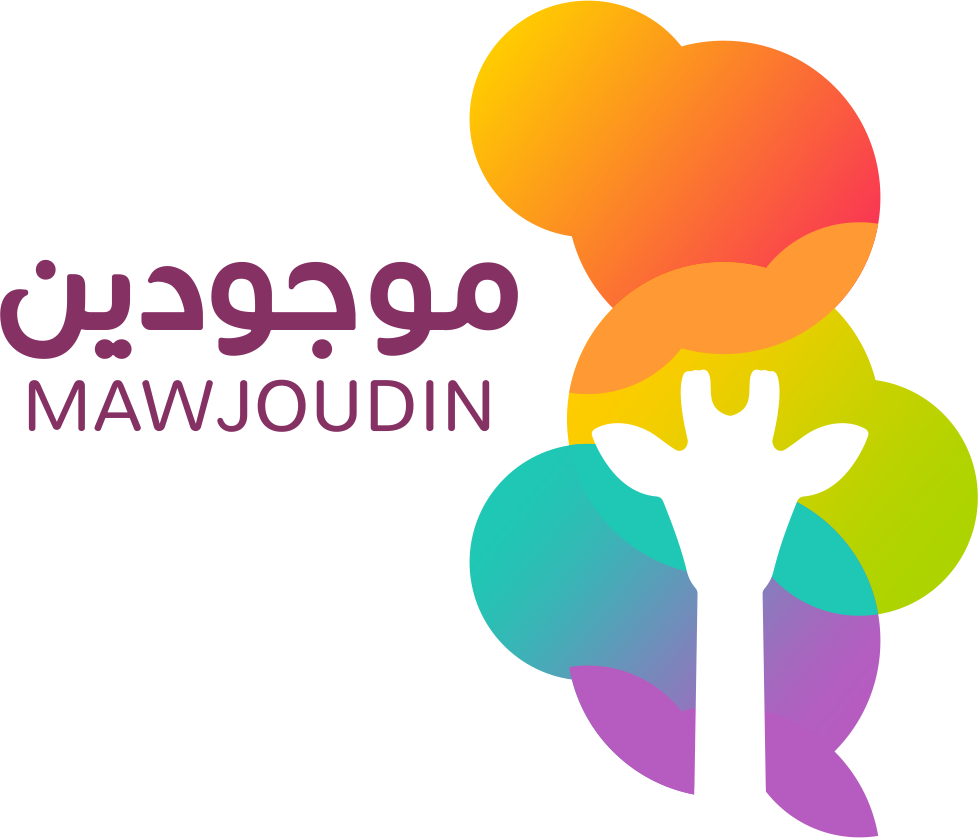
- Founded: December 2014; 11 years ago
- Type: Non-governmental organization
- Purpose: Promotion of equal rights for sexual minorities
- Headquarters: Tunis, Tunisia
- Region served: Tunisia
- Website: www.mawjoudin.org

Mawjoudin (Arabic: موجودين, lit. '[we] exist'), or Mawjoudin Initiative for Equality, is a non-governmental organisation that advocates for the rights of sexual minorities, especially LGBTQI+ people, in Tunisia.

== History ==
The organisation was founded in December 2014 by feminist and LGBTQI+ activists that had in common the fight against heterosexism, homophobia, biphobia, transphobia and sexism or any other form of discrimination based on sexual orientation, gender identity and expression and sexual characteristics.

== Mission ==
The association offers safe spaces for support and psychological follow-up to the victims of discrimination. It proposes places for peer listening between the members of the community and provides information on the rights of LGBTQI+ people.

=== Awareness and monitoring ===
The association of Mawjoudin regularly provides reports on the rights of LGBTQI+ people to promote human rights, particularly sexual and bodily rights. Its members offer interventions in universities' spaces.

The organisation has a network of health (psychotherapists, psychologists and doctors) and legal (jurists and lawyers) professionals, as well as its important work in advocacy challenging cases of arbitrary arrests that are solely related to gender identity or sexual orientation, and even other cases of torture perpetrated by the police.

This association also offers workshops that allow the expansion of the network of the people sensitive to this issue and put in place acts of solidarity with the community.

A member, for instance, have created two comic strips based on testimonies of LGBTQI+ people.

In May 2020, Mawjoudin stated that reports of recognition of same-sex marriage in Tunisia were wrong and disappointing.

=== Mawjoudin Queer Film Festival ===
Every year since 2018 Mawjoudin has been organising the Mawjoudin Queer Film Festival, the first festival of its kind in the country and in North Africa, in Tunis.

== Partners ==
The organisation counts among its international partners institutions operating outside of the theme of Tunisian LGBTQI+ communities. It is a part of the Tunisian coalition for the rights of LGBTQI+ people, amongst other organisations such as Chouf (organisers of the feminist festival Chouftouhonna) and Damj. It is also a founding member of the Maghreb Queer Coalition.

== See also ==
- LGBT rights in Tunisia
