= Dora Bouchoucha =

Tunisian film producer, actor and a feminist activist

- درة بوشوشة
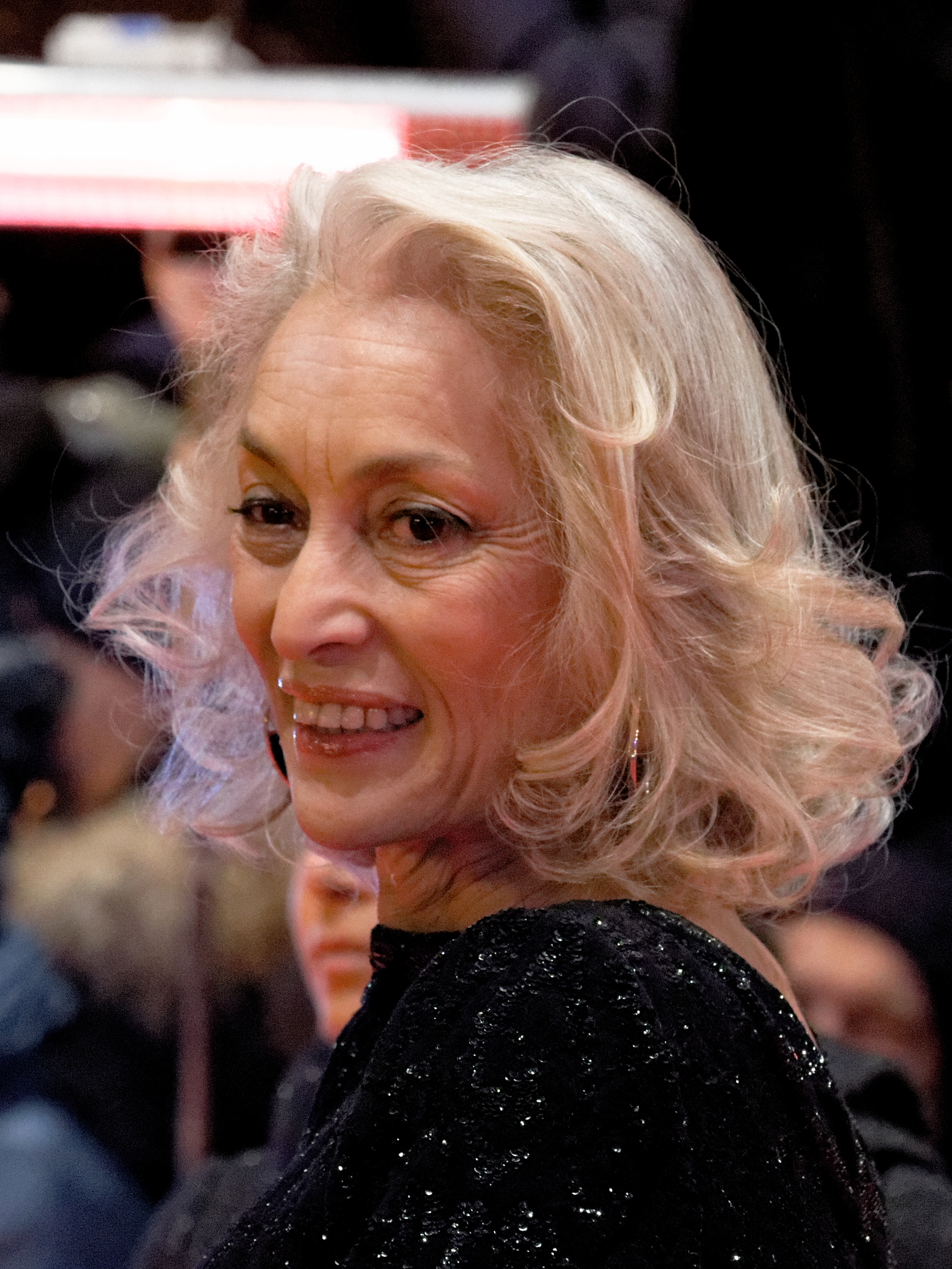
- Dora Bouchoucha at Berlinale in 2017
- Born: 1957 (age 68–69); Tunisia
- Education: Sorbonne university
- Occupations: Film producer and actor
- Notable work: Red Satin

Dora Bouchoucha (Arabic: درة بوشوشة; born 11 October 1957) is a Tunisian film producer and one of the nine members of the Individual Freedoms and Equality Committee.

== Biography ==
Dora Bouchoucha graduated in 1987 from the Sorbonne University with a degree in English literature. In 1995, along with Ibrahim Letaïef, she co-founded her private production company called Nomadis Images. She also went on to found an association called Sud Écriture which provides training for African and Arab authors. Moreover, Bouchoucha led Carthage Film Festival 3 times: 2008, 2010 and 2014.

Dora Bouchoucha has been present in several international film festivals as a judge, for example at the Berlinale in 2017, and as part of debates and round tables. In the same year, she was chosen as a permanent member of the CineMart committee within the Rotterdam International Film Festival. In 2018, she became part of the Individual Freedoms and Equality Committee whose mission was to work on a reform project that aligns with the 2014 Tunisian constitution and the international human rights standards. Bouchoucha was also elected to join the Academy of Motion Picture Arts and Sciences that organizes the Academy Awards as a member along with 11 other Arab filmmakers. She also joined as a jury member for the Luigi De Laurentiis Venice Award for Debut Film of the 77th Venice International Film Festival.

== Awards ==
- Grand officer of the Ordre national du Mérite (Tunisia, 2010).
- Commander of Ordre des Arts et des Lettres (France, 2015).
- Officer of Ordre de la République (Tunisie, 2016).
- Berlinale best first film prize (Germany, 2016).
- Chosen by the New African magazine as one of the 100 most influential Africans (2017).
- Tribute from the El Gouna Film Festival for her filmography.

== Filmography ==
Year	Film title	Director	Category
1997	Sabriya	Abderrahmane Sissako	Short film
2000	Demain, je brûle	Mohamed Ben Smaïl	Feature film
2000	The Season of Men	Moufida Tlatli	Feature film
2001	One Evening in July	Raja Amari	Short film
2001	Avec tout mon amour	Amalia Escriva	Feature film
2002	Red Satin	Raja Amari	Feature film
2003	Le Soleil assassiné	Abdelkrim Bahloul	Feature film
2004	Seekers of Oblivion	Raja Amari	Documentary
2008	Slaget om Tobruk	Václav Marhoul	Feature film
2009	Les Secrets	Raja Amari	Feature film
2012	C'était mieux demain	Hinde Boujemaa	Feature film
2013	Ouled Ammar	Nasreddine Ben Maati	Documentary
2016	Hedi, un vent de liberté	Mohamed Ben Attia	Feature film
2018	Corps étranger	Raja Amari	Feature film
2018	Weldi	Mohamed Ben Attia	Feature film

== Personal life ==
Dora Bouchoucha is married to Kamel Fourati. Together they have two daughters; one of them is Kenza Fourati, who's a model based in Brooklyn and Maleke an academic with a PhD in Economics.
