= Killing of Khalil Suleiman =

Palestinian doctor

- Part of Second Intifada
- Poster memorializing Suleiman
- Location: Jenin, West Bank, Palestine
- Deaths: 1
- Injuries: 5
- Victims: Khalil Suleiman and 5 other ambulance staff
- Perpetrator: Israel Defense Forces

Khalil Suleiman (Arabic: خليل سليمان) (1943/1944 – 4 March 2002) was a Palestinian doctor and the head of the Palestine Red Crescent Society (PRCS) Emergency Medical Service in Jenin, Palestine. He was killed by the Israel Defense Forces (IDF) in 2002 while traveling in an ambulance to rescue a wounded girl during the Second Intifada. The IDF stated that they fired on the ambulance because it was driving towards them at high speed, but eyewitnesses interviewed by Human Rights Watch and Reuters disputed this claim. A piece of the ambulance was included in the Jenin Horse, a monument constructed from scrap metal in 2003 and later dismantled by the IDF in 2023.

== Background ==
Suleiman was a doctor. Around 1982, he began volunteering with the PRCS and later served as the head of the PRCS Emergency Medical Service in Jenin for 10 years. Beginning in 1996, he conducted first aid trainings throughout 40 villages in the West Bank as part of a health education project funded by Norwegian People's Aid.

== Death ==
=== IDF attack on ambulance ===
On March 4, 2002, Suleiman was traveling in a clearly marked ambulance while attempting to rescue a wounded girl from Jenin. According to the PRCS director and a physician at the Jenin Hospital, the ambulance's trip had been pre-approved by the IDF. The IDF fired at the ambulance, hitting the oxygen tanks and causing a fire. Sources differ on the weapon used, pointing to gunfire, tank shell, or rifle-mounted grenade. Another ambulance team was dispatched to treat the casualties but was prevented from reaching the site of the attack because the IDF fired on their ambulance, wounding them.

Suleiman burned to death inside the ambulance. In addition, five PRCS workers from the two ambulances were injured, including two who were hospitalized with burns.

In an interview with B'Tselem, a man who lived nearby said that the IDF had taken over an upstairs bedroom in his home the day of the attack. The eyewitness stated that he watched the commander fire a grenade at Suleiman's ambulance from the bedroom window. The grenade hit the windshield, and the ambulance was then engulfed in flames. The next day, he saw that the ambulance had crashed into a house and burned completely. He said that some of Suleiman's bones were in the front seat.

Suleiman was 58 years old when he was killed. His funeral was held on March 5. The procession through Jenin was led by doctors wearing white coats. He was buried in Jenin.

=== Reactions ===
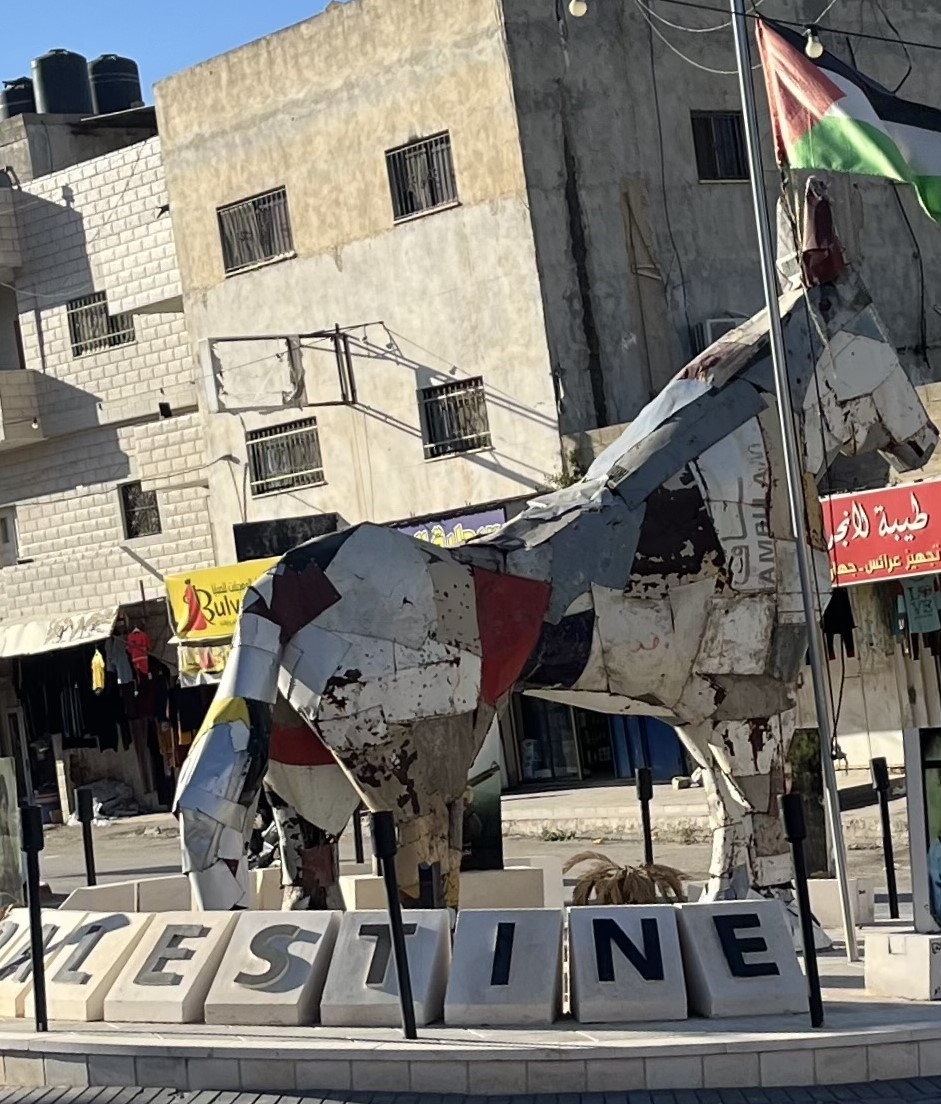
The Jenin Horse, a metal sculpture that incorporated a piece of the ambulance where Suleiman was killed

The IDF accused Palestinians of using ambulances for military purposes and stated that the ambulance had "exploded" when hit: "which raises questions about what was in it and what the intent of the drivers was." Later, they stated that the soldiers had fired on the ambulance in self-defense after it "charged toward them at a high speed from an area in which there were exchanges of fire". Additionally, the IDF called the attack a "tragic aberration". According to witnesses interviewed by Human Rights Watch and Reuters, Suleiman's ambulance was attacked while it was moving slowly on a narrow street.

The International Red Cross (ICRC) released a statement advocating for both Israelis and Palestinians to ensure the safety of emergency medical workers. The ICRC noted that Suleiman was the second PRCS worker killed in the Second Intifada and that so far 122 PRCS workers and six Magen David Adom workers had been injured.

The attack was condemned by several organizations. In their statements, Norwegian People's Aid and the National Arab American Medical Association denounced Israel's killing of Palestinian healthcare workers. The European Commission noted that the ambulance was one of six that ECHO had donated to PRCS in January 2001 and called the attack a violation of the Geneva Conventions. Human Rights Watch released a statement entitled: "Israel: Cease Attacking Medical Personnel" after the IDF fired on three ambulances in one week, injuring nine and killing three ambulance workers, including Suleiman. They stated that "deliberate attacks on medical personnel, vehicles and infrastructure constitute a grave breach of the Geneva Conventions."

Suleiman's death and other Israeli attacks on healthcare in the West Bank were mentioned in reports by several organizations including Amnesty International, B'Tselem, Physicians for Human Rights-US, and the United Nations Secretary-General.

== Legacy ==
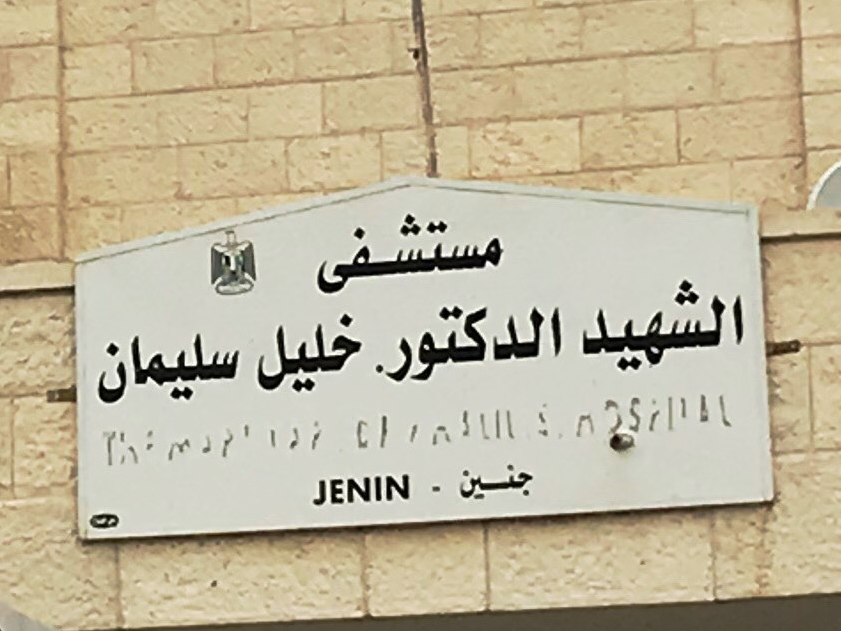
Sign for the Martyr Doctor Khalil Suleiman Hospital

The Jenin Governmental Hospital is now also known as the Martyr Doctor Khalil Suleiman Hospital. The hospital director said that the purpose of the renaming was: "to remember a person, a national hero, who sacrificed to save others." His brother's son was named Khalil in his memory. In 2015, a ceremony was held to commemorate the 13th anniversary of Suleiman's death.

The year after Suleiman was killed, German artist Thomas Kilpper and several Palestinian young people built a 16 foot sculpture in the shape of a horse out of the scrap metal of houses and vehicles destroyed by the IDF in Jenin. The resulting artwork, called the Jenin Horse, included a piece of the ambulance in which Suleiman was killed by the IDF. Considered a landmark of Jenin, it stood at the entrance of the Jenin Refugee Camp for twenty years until it was dismantled in October 2023 by the IDF.
