= Mustapha Ben Ismaïl =

Tunisian politician and reformer

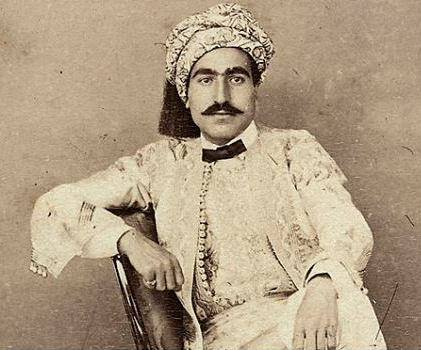

Prime Minister of Tunisia
- In office 24 August 1878 – 12 September 1881
- Monarch: Muhammad III
- Preceded by: Mohammed Khaznadar
- Succeeded by: Mohammed Khaznadar

Personal details
- Born: c. 1850 Bizerte, Kingdom of Tunisia
- Died: 1887 (aged 36–37) Istanbul, Ottoman Empire

Mustapha Ben Ismaïl (Arabic: مصطفى بن اسماعيل; born around 1850 in Bizerte and died in 1887 in Istanbul) was a Tunisian politician.

His origin is obscure and few details are known of his youth. Some hostile sources make him the son of a Jewish convert and an unknown Tunisian man, with his mother remarrying to a Muslim and settling in Tunis. Subsequently, he is meant to have begged on the streets of the capital, worked in a Maltese tavern and then for a barber, before being hired by an offer of the guard of the Bey of Tunis, who brought him into the palace. There he is said to have been noticed by Muhammad III as-Sadiq at the beginning of his reign.

The Bey appointed him Intendant of his Civil List, a general of his guard, and Qaid of Cap Bon. His influence is discernable from the end of 1872 and grew without pause. After he contributed to the fall of Mustapha Khaznadar, he became Minister of the Navy in October 1873, in the government of Hayreddin Pasha, then Minister of the Interior and member of the International Financial Commission in July 1877, and finally Grand Vizier on 24 August 1878 - a post which he held until 12 September 1881. During his vizierate, Ben Ismaïl stirred up the anger of the Bey against Hayreddin's reforms and policy of court austerity. Little by little Ben Ismaïl gained the majority of Hayreddin's property as it was confiscated by the Bey. Influenced by the French consul, Ben Ismaïl began to support the development of French enterprise in Tunisia, then became more favourable towards the Italians, France's competitors, from 1880. The establishment of the French protectorate of Tunisia and the death of Sadok Bey in 1882 ruined his career, but he managed to retain a small part of his fortune and fled to Istanbul, where he became obscure. He died almost completely destitute according to the French historian Jean Ganiage. However, he appears to have financially supported the first Tunisian nationalist exiles after the establishment of the protectorate, with whom he retained some contacts, which argues against the idea that he was in financial difficulty, as do his favourable connections with the Ottoman state.

Preceded by Mohammed Khaznadar	Prime Minister of Tunisia; 1878-1881	Succeeded by Mohammed Khaznadar
