= Bochra Belhaj Hmida =

Tunisian lawyer and politician

- بشرى بلحاج حميدة
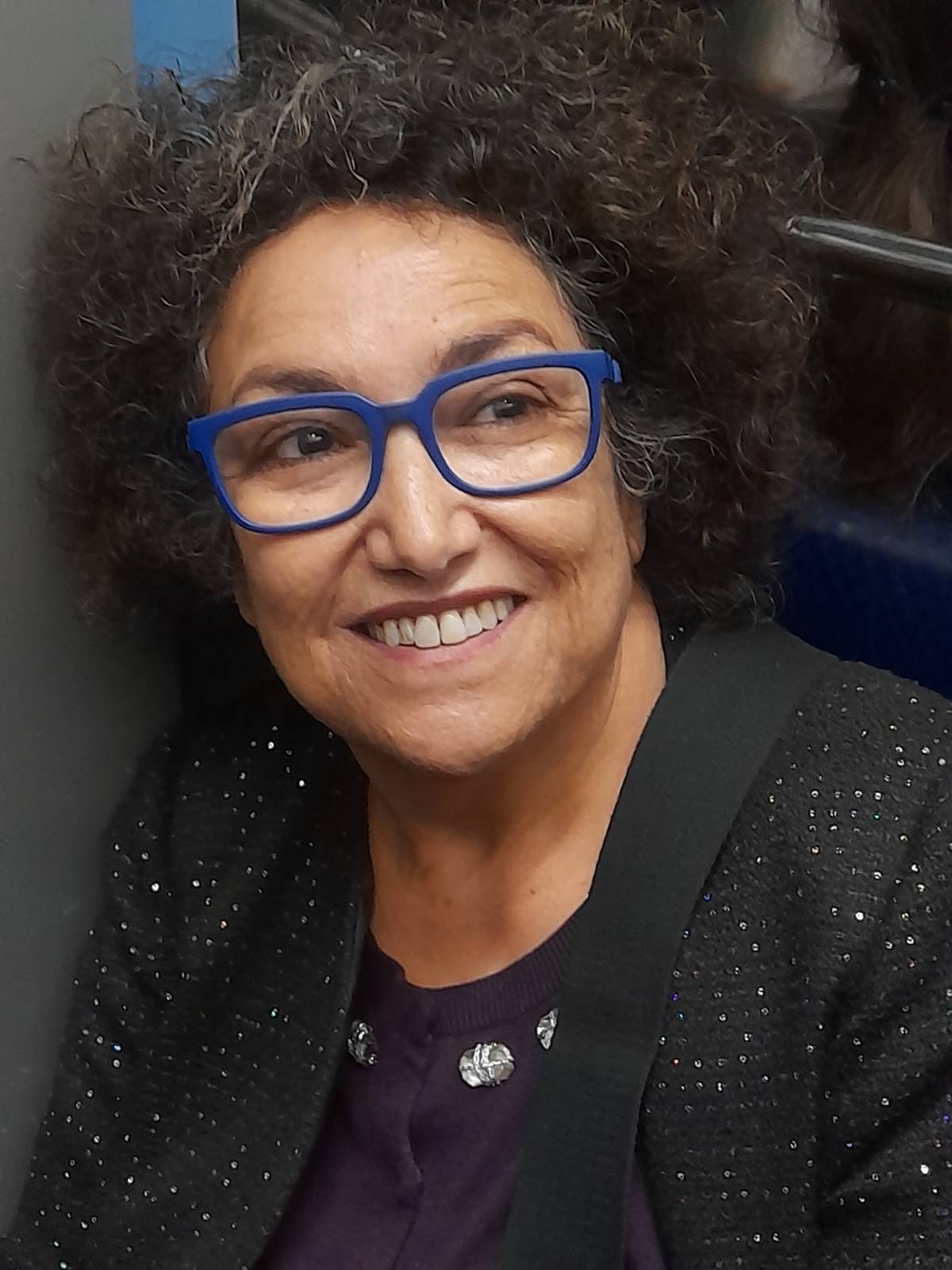
- Bochra Belhaj Hmida in December 2014

Bochra Belhaj Hmida (Arabic: بشرى بلحاج حميدة), is a Tunisian lawyer, politician and activist from Zaghouan.

== Biography ==
Belhaj Hmida became interested in activism during her childhood, and experienced political upheaval during the authoritarian presidency of Zine El Abidine Ben Ali.

Bochra Belhaj Hmida has a Law graduate degree. In 1989, she co-created the Association Tunisienne des Femmes Démocrates – ATFD (Tunisian Association of Democratic Women) and was the president of the organization from 1994 to 1998.

In 2012, she represented a young woman who survived being raped by police officers. According to her, the Ennahda Government was responsible morally and politically.

She joined the Democratic Forum for Labour and Liberties in 2011. She then ran for the constituent assembly election as the leader of the Zaghouan constituency list, but she was not elected.

In September 2012, she was made a member of the executive committee of the movement Nidaa Tounes. During the legislative elections of October 2014, she was elected at the People Representative Assembly as a representative of the second constituency of Tunis. In her second term she continued to call for an evolution of women's rights in Tunisia.

Bochra Belhaj Hmida is also president of the Individual Freedom and Equality Commission (COLIBE), initiated by the Tunisian president Béji Caïd Essebsi on August 13, 2017. It aims to build a report concerning legislative reforms for individual freedom and equality, as required by the 2014 Constitution and by human rights international norms. As a president, Bochra Belhaj Hmida has led a proposed reform of inheritance laws between men and women.

In 2023, the Tunisian government accused Belhaj Hmida of "conspiracy", in a move criticized by Amnesty International. In November 2025, her 33-year prison sentence was upheld on appeal.

== Honors ==
On 13 August 2018, National Women's Day, Bochra Belhaj Hmida was given the insignia of Commander of the Order of Tunisian Republic by the Tunisian President. On September 27 2018, she received an award from the foundation Global Hope Coalition. She was named politician of the year in 2018 by the Tunisian press. In 2019, she was awarded the Fatima al-Fihriya Prize in recognition of her involvement in the process of individual freedoms and equality in Tunisia.
