= Samah Jabr =

Palestinian writer (born 1976)

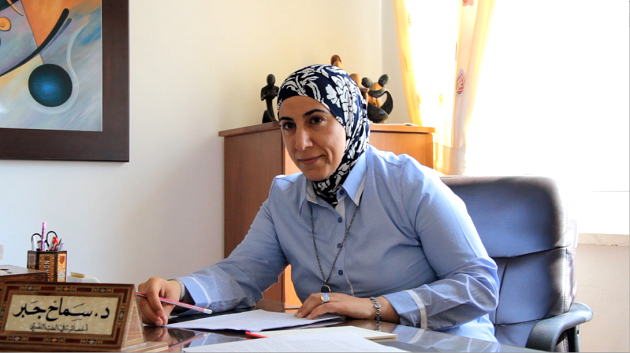
- Born: August 8, 1976 (age 50)
- Occupations: Psychiatrist, psychotherapist and writer

Samah Jabr (Arabic: سماح جبر, born 8 August 1976) is a Palestinian Jerusalemite psychiatrist, psychotherapist and writer, and former Head of the Mental Health Unit in the Ministry of Health, Palestine. She has written columns about the psychological consequences of the Israeli occupation in Palestine since the 2000s. Inspired by anticolonial psychiatrist Frantz Fanon, her areas of interest include mental health, colonialism and universal human rights.

== Biography ==
Samah Jabr was born to a Jerusalemite family on August 8, 1976. She graduated from Al-Quds University (Jerusalem) in 2001, a member of the first cohort of the Faculty of Medicine. She gained advanced training in psychiatry in France and the United Kingdom, as well as in clinical research in the United States. She specialized in psychotherapy and was trained at the Israel Psychoanalytic Institute of Jerusalem. Jabr is one of 22 psychiatrists practicing in the West Bank, and among the first Palestinian women in this profession.

== Career ==
Jabr served as the Head of the Mental Health Unit in the Palestinian Ministry of Health for over 9 years, and practices as a psychiatrist and a psychotherapist in the private and public sectors. Her research is published in both Palestinian and international peer-reviewed journals. Her work revolves around human rights in the field of psychiatry and especially in the context of Palestine. One example is "the survival and well-being of the Palestinian people under occupation".

Jabr has taught at various Palestinian universities and is a supervisor at the George Washington University (Washington). She is a fellow at the Centre for Science and Policy (University of Cambridge). She works as a consultant and a trainer for the United Nations Office on Drugs and Crime (UNODC), Save the Children and Doctors Without Borders (MSF).

A volunteer for the Public Committee Against Torture in Israel (PCATI), Jabr contributes to establishing reports based on the testimonies of victims. In the documentary Beyond the Frontlines: Tales of Resistance and Resilience in Palestine (Alexandra Dols, 2017, France), she explains that the objective is to let the perpetrators know that their acts of torture are known, reported and filed, so that they may be held accountable.

Jabr has been a regular guest of Palestinian radio station Nisaa FM and of Panarab channel Al Araby, where she has been interviewed on topics including mental health, the rights of people with special needs, marginalization and abuse. In early 2024, she was invited to give the Edward Said ‘57 memorial lecture at Princeton University titled “Radiance in Pain and Resilience: The Global Reverberation of Palestinian Historical Trauma”

Jabr is also a prolific writer on diverse subjects, in both academic and public media, related to mental health and Palestinian human rights; she authored the books Derrière les fronts: Chroniques d’une psychiatre psychothérapeute palestinienne sous occupation, Sumud em tempos de genocidio, TRAS LOS FRENTES, Sumud, and Dietro i fronti, which appear in a multitude of languages like Spanish, Portuguese, Italian and French. Jabr also published columns in the Washington Report on Middle East Affairs and the Middle East Monitor. Her perspective is that "the Israeli occupation is not only a political issue, but indeed a mental health problem".

Jabr has also been a guest of organizations supporting the Palestinian people in France, where she has been invited by local association Les amis de Jayyous, as well as national France-Palestine Solidarity Association (AFPS) and Union juive française pour la paix (UJFP). Institutions including the School of Oriental and African Studies (SOAS), the Tavistock & Portman NHS Foundation Trust and the Institut de Recherche et d'Études Méditerranée Moyen-Orient (iReMMO, Paris) have had her as a speaker. According to Jabr, and in accordance with Fanon's views, one of the core challenges of the Palestinian struggle for national liberation is the necessity to build "a psychological understanding and culture that can liberate the people’s minds, parallel to the liberation of the land".

== Selected perspectives ==
=== Suicide and sacrifice ===
Jabr distinguishes between the act of suicide, driven by despair, and the act of sacrifice, drawn by hope.

Suicidal actions are often egocentric because the individual’s spark of life has lost its meaning in interpersonal terms. In contrast, the self-sacrificing person–even on the pathway to death–may be full of hope, indeed perhaps too much so. The act of self-sacrifice often involves an altruistic dedication to others and an eagerness to improve their future chances. Their hope is to extinguish their own soul in the service of giving light to others and brighten the road ahead.

Regarding mental health statistics for Palestine, and post-traumatic stress disorder data specifically, Jabr questions the methodology and definitions given by the World Health Organization. "It’s important to develop your own mental health standards", she says.

=== Colonial privilege ===
In December 2017, Jabr called out to the International Association of Relational Psychoanalysis and Psychotherapy (IARPP), requesting that they reconsider the location of their 2019 annual conference, Tel Aviv. Such an international event, she argued, "shields Israel from public exposure of its atrocities". The IARPP board would not hear her arguments.

"In a narrow sense, we are not a political organisation," claims the IARPP leadership, giving them the luxury of distancing their psychological experience from the occupation while at the same time consuming the privileges of the occupation. For Palestinians, there is no such luxury; the occupation that deprives us of our loved ones, spies on our private relationships, strips our clothes from us, steals years from our lives, deprives us of our health and confronts us with continuous grief and humiliation, this is in every sense very personal and very psychological. Only those who side with the powerful are keen to ignore the dialectical relationship between the psychological and political.

The IARPP position triggered a petition, initiated and circulated together with the Jewish Voice for Peace (JVP). A group of Palestinian mental health clinicians with Israeli citizenship called out to the IARPP directly, as well as more than 30 members of the Israeli organization Psychoactive - Mental Health Professionals for Human Rights (Hebrew: פסיכואקטיב - אנשי ונשות בריאות הנפש למען זכויות אדם).

=== Responsibility ===
In November 2015, Jabr launched a call to mental health professional worldwide to side with the Palestinian people, along with the UK/USA Palestine Mental Health Network. The petition is a reminder that her professional community has a mission "to promote the integrity of the individual", and that "preconditions for this are social justice and the enjoyment of universal human rights".

We call upon mental health professionals to engage in sociopolitical solidarity with the people of Palestine as a therapeutic position. Dedicating ourselves to this work while the occupation continues will give us the insights we will need in the future, as facilitators involved in the process of reconciliation. Laying down a foundation of involvement during a time of crisis prepares us for participating in a resolution to the crisis that will bring genuine redress, justice, and full civil rights to the people of Palestine.

== Awards and honors ==
Jabr's research in biochemistry was granted the Howard Hughes Medical Institute Award in 1998. In 1999, she benefited from the Women in Science and Engineering (WiSE) Program at the Iowa State University, and later received a scholarship from the Dubai Harvard Foundation for Medical Research (DHFMR) in 2014. She is a fellow at the Centre for Science and Policy (University of Cambridge).

In 2001, Jabr received the Media Monitors Network's Award for her articles on the Second Intifada, and she was elected “Personality of the Year” by the readers of French Muslim website Oumma.com in 2015.

=== Portrayal in media ===
Jabr is portrayed in the documentary feature film Beyond the Frontlines: Tales of Resistance and Resilience in Palestine (2017), by French director Alexandra Dols. The film received the Sunbird Award for best documentary at the Palestinian festival, Days of Cinema. Beyond the Frontlines introduces its audience to sumud (Arabic: صمود), a concept that is both close to and different from the one of resilience. Jabr stresses that this word has been used by Palestinians since their struggle against the British occupation. She describes resilience as "oriented towards a state of mind" while sumud includes "an orientation to action" as well. Sumud means "maintaining a steadfast defiance to subjugation and occupation", and has a decisive collective dimension, for it also suggests "maintaining […] moral and social solidarity."

The book Derrière les fronts. Chroniques d'une psychiatre psychothérapeute palestinienne sous occupation (PMN Editions and Hybrid Pulse, 2018) presents a collection of Jabr's columns translated into French. In its review, newspaper Le Monde diplomatique, stated that Jabr, "drawing on her clinical observations and nourished by Frantz Fanon, allows us to see the extent of the pathologies that affect the individual and threaten social cohesion, as a direct consequence of 'the realm of the murderously absurd' imposed but the occupying power".

Jabr appears in two other feature films. In Afterward (2018), Jerusalem-born and New York-based psychoanalyst Ofra Bloch confronts her own feelings about, and the tensions between, the genocide of European Jews and the expulsion of Palestinians from their land in 1948, known as the Nakba. In Fanon, hier, aujourd'hui (2018), French-Algerian director Hassane Mezine explores the life and legacy of Frantz Fanon, by interviewing past and contemporary activists who have struggled against injustice in various countries around the world.
