= Tunisian protests =

Tunisian protests may refer to:

- Tunisian Revolution in 2010
- 2013–14 Tunisian political crisis
- 2016 Tunisian protests
- 2018 Tunisian protests
- 2021 Tunisian protests
- 2021 political crisis in Tunisia
- 2025 Tunisian protests
