= Kairouan homosexuality case =

Arrest of six Tunisian men on grounds of homosexuality

On 10 December 2015, six male university students in the city of Kairouan in Tunisia, were sentenced to six years in prison for allegedly having sex with other men and were banned from Kairouan for five years after they had completed their sentences. Article 230 of the Penal Code of Tunisia criminalises men having sex with men.

They had been detained by the authorities in November and early December, and underwent anal examinations to supposedly prove they had been anally penetrated. The men accused tried to refuse the examinations but were forced to undergo them by the police. Forced anal examinations, which are routine in Tunisia and other countries that criminalise sex between men, are considered a form of torture by Amnesty International.

One defense lawyer argued that even if the test could conclusively prove that the accused had been anally penetrated, it could not prove that this was done with a penis as opposed to an object. However, the Tunisian courts accepted the forensic evidence without qualification.
