= Mawjoudin Queer Film Festival =

LGBTQ film festival in Tunisia

Mawjoudin Queer Film Festival مهرجان موجودين للأفلام الكويرية
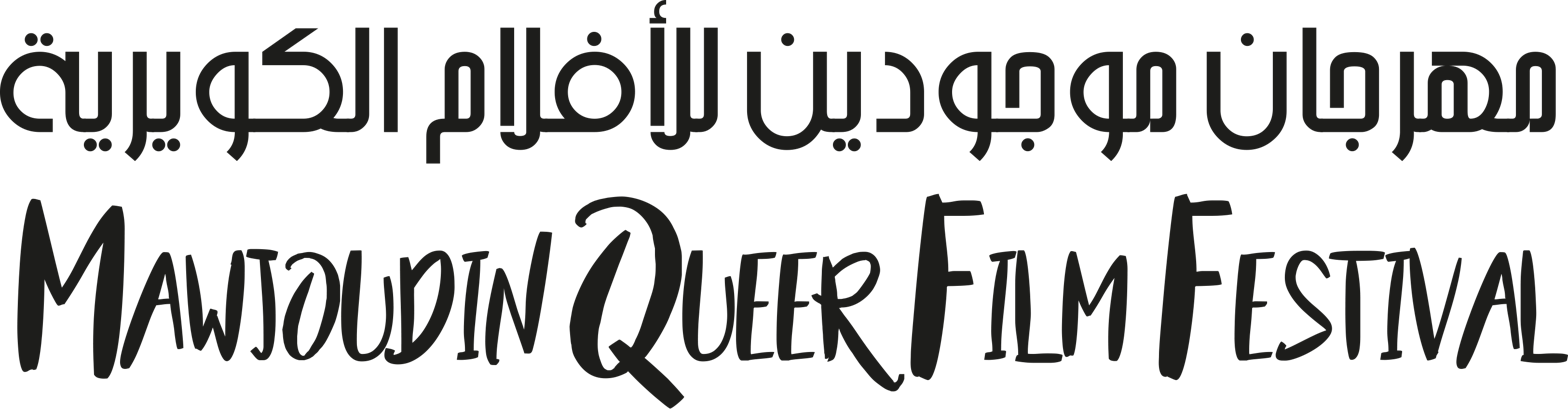
- Locations: Tunis, Tunisia
- Country: Tunisia
- Founded: 2018
- Founders: Mawjoudin
- Website: queerfilmfestival.mawjoudin.org

The Mawjoudin Queer Film Festival (Arabic: مهرجان موجودين للأفلام الكويرية, romanized: mahrajān Mawjūdīn li-l-aflām al-kwīriyya) is an annual film festival in Tunisia celebrating the LGBT community. It began in 2018, as the first queer film festival in the country and all of North Africa. It is organized by Mawjoudin, a Tunisian NGO whose name translates to "[we] exist". The focus is on queer identities, especially in people from the Global South.

== Motivation ==
The festival aims to create a space for queer people that is neither heteronormative nor homophobic. Because of security reasons, the location of the festival is not disclosed; people interested in participating in the festival first need to get in contact with the organizers.

The organizers see the festival as a form of activism: "We are trying to fight not only in the courts but through art."

== History ==
=== First edition ===
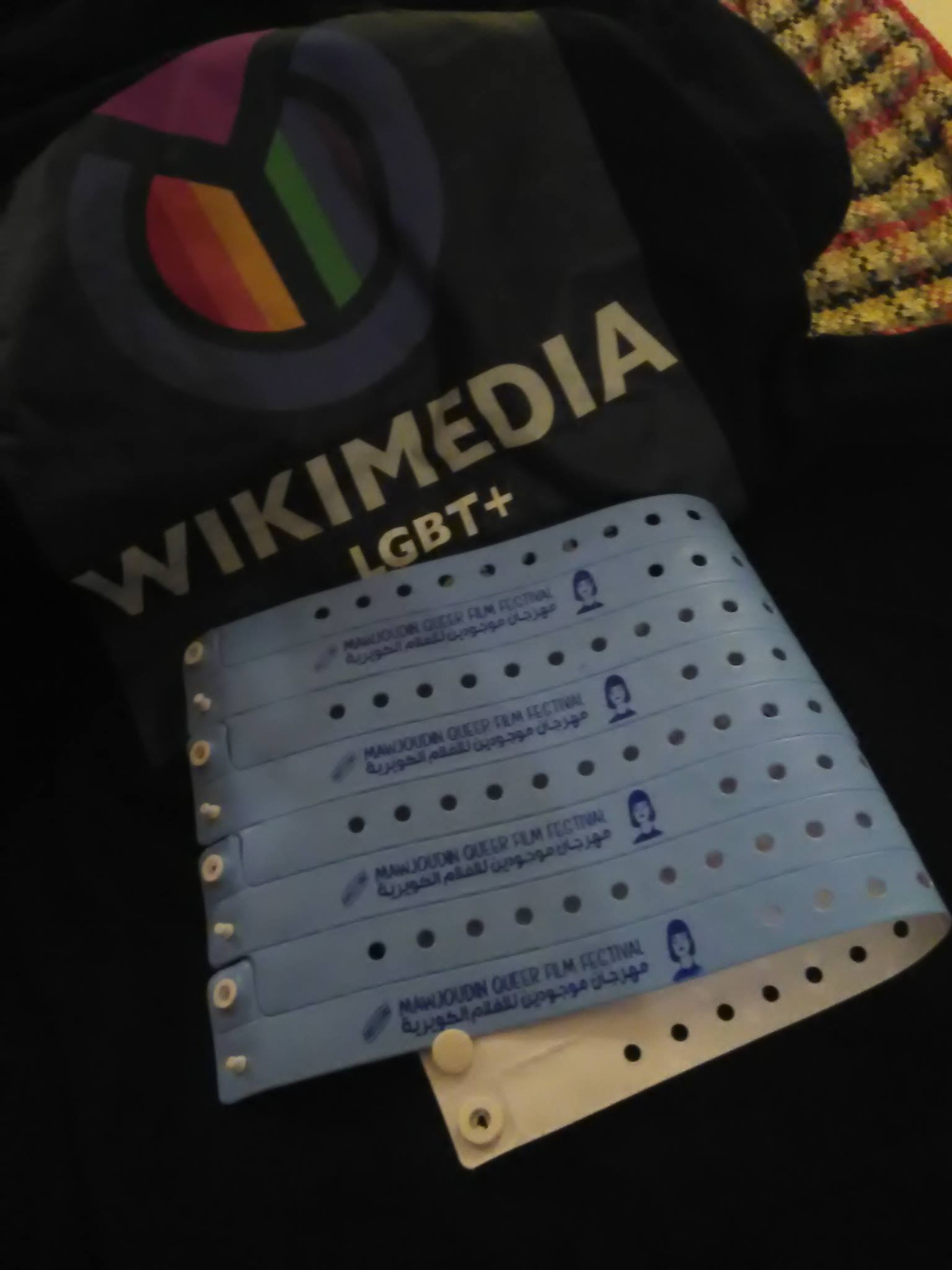
Bracelets from the 2019 Mawjoudin Queer Film Festival

The first festival took place from January 15–18, 2018. It received funding support from the Hirschfeld Eddy Foundation. Major themes were gender and non-heteronormative sexuality. In addition to showing 12 short- and medium-length films, the festival included concerts, debates, and the panel discussions "Queer as Art" and "Queer as Resistance".

=== Second edition ===
The second edition of the festival was March 22–25, 2019, in downtown Tunis. The 2019 festival aimed to cover the full LGBTQI spectrum, and have a strong focus on feminism. A total of 31 films were shown, including Argentinian, Chinese, Indian, Kenyan, Pakistani, Portuguese, and Tunisian films. In addition to films, there were performances, debates, and a theater workshop entitled "Towards a Queer Theater".

=== Third edition ===
The third edition of the festival planned between the 20th and 23 March 2020 was postponed because of the COVID-19 pandemic.

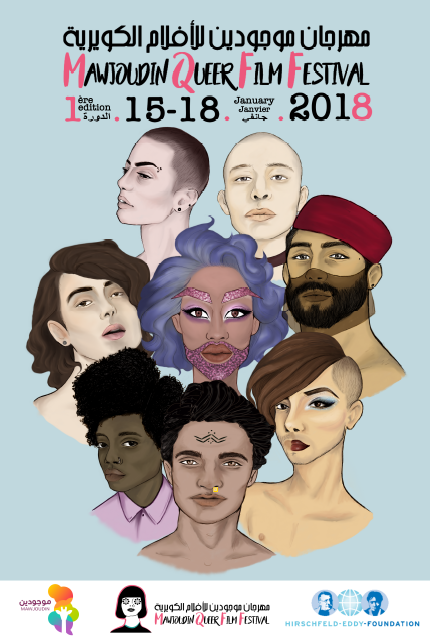
Poster of the first edition in 2018

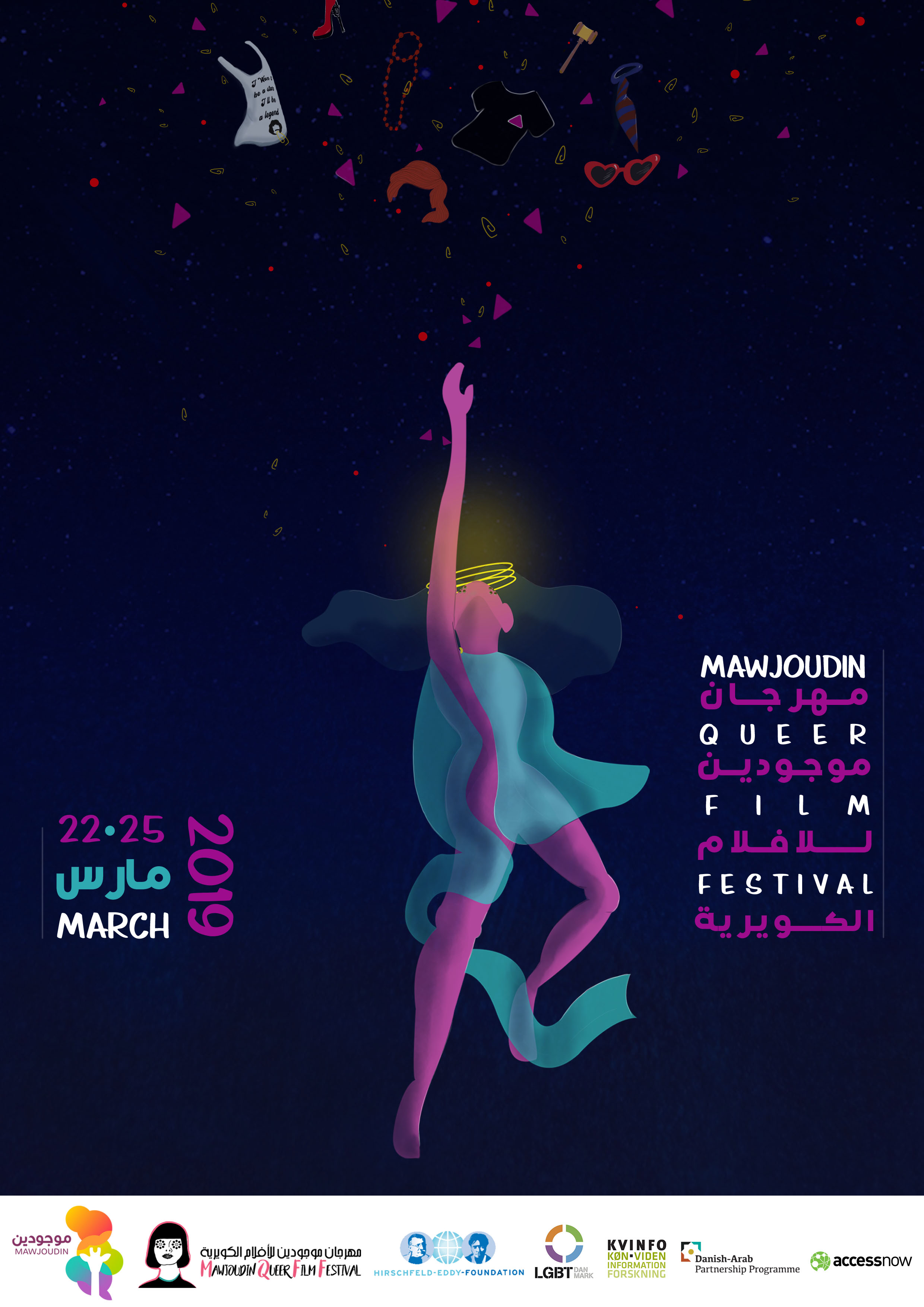
Poster of the second edition in 2019

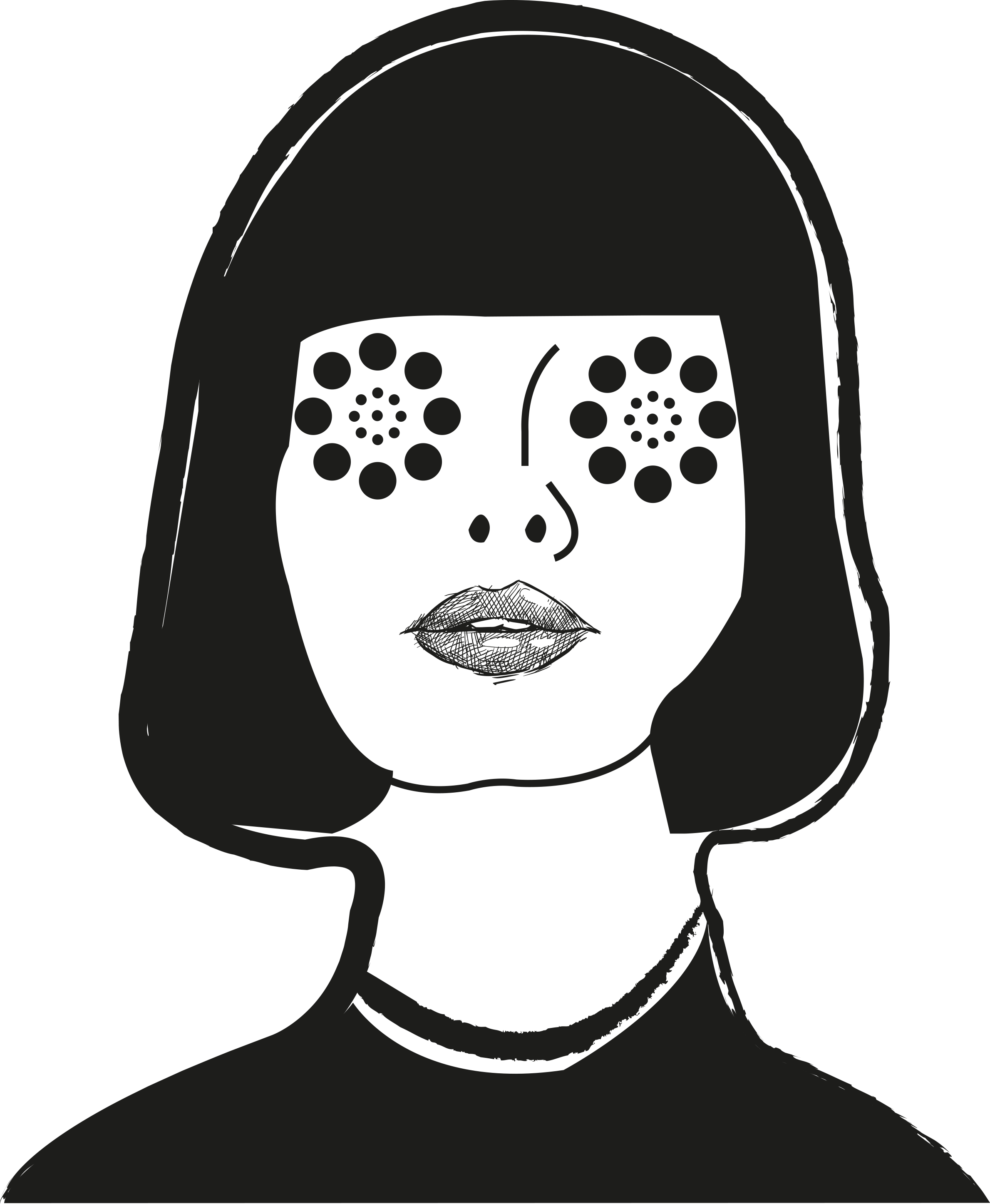
Official mascot of the festival

== Films ==
At the 2018 festival, "Upon The Shadow" was screened on the opening day. The film is a Tunisian docudrama by Nada Mezni Hafaiedh, which received recognition at the Carthage Film Festival.

Films screened during the festival in 2019 include:

- "Extravaganza", a Chinese documentary by Matthew Baren
- "Rafiki", a Kenyan film by Wanuri Kahiu
- "Sisak", a silent short film by Faraz Arif Ansari
- "Today Match at Three", an Argentinian film by Clarisa Navas about women's football in the wake of the 2019 FIFA Women's World Cup
- "Travesty", a documentary by Safwen Abdellali that follows the story of a transgender person
- "A Tribord, Je Vomis", by Tarek Sardi, co-produced by festival organizers Mawjoudin
- "Ymin el Baccouche", by Tarek Sardi, which denounces biphobia

== See also ==
- List of LGBT film festivals
