= Individual Freedoms and Equality Committee (Tunisia) =

- Abbreviation: COLIBE
- Formation: August 13, 2017; 9 years ago
- Founder: Beji Caid Essebsi
- Type: Consultative commission
- Purpose: Preparing a report on legislative reforms concerning individual freedoms and equality
- Fields: Individual freedoms
- Members: Kerim Bouzouita; Abdelmajid Charfi; Slim Laghmani; Salwa Hamrouni; Slaheddine Jourchi; Iqbal Gharbi; Malek Ghazouani; Dora Bouchoucha
- President: Bochra Belhaj Hmida
- Website: colibe.org

The Individual Freedoms and Equality Committee (COLIBE, in French Commission des libertés individuelles et de l'égalité) is a commission created by the president of Tunisia Beji Caid Essebsi on 13 August 2017. The committee is in charge of preparing a report on legislative reforms concerning individual freedoms and equality in accordance with the Constitution of 2014 and international human rights standards.

== Mission ==
The committee is charged with contributing to the state of individual freedoms and equality in Tunisia through the preparation of a reform project in accordance with the requirements of the Tunisian Constitution of 2014 and international human rights standards.

Indeed, the Constitution includes a number of chapters on individual freedoms and the principles of equality, while many legislation and laws inherited from the French protectorate and the dictatorship are incompatible with the principles and spirit of contained changes.

== Members ==
The Individual Freedoms and Equality Committee is composed of nine members:

Picture	Name	Profile
	Bochra Belhaj Hmida	Lawyer and member of the Assembly of the Representatives of the People, she is an activist for women's and human rights. She is a founding member then president of the Tunisian Association of Democratic Women and founding member of the local section of Amnesty International.
	Kerim Bouzouita	Doctor in anthropology. He teaches in several universities in Tunisia, including the Political School of Tunis and the Higher School of Economics, and abroad including Loyola University Chicago or University of Canterbury. He is the author of several anthropological works on the question of power.
	Abdelmajid Charfi	Islamologist, professor emeritus of Tunisian universities and former dean of the Faculty of Literature and Human Sciences of Tunis, he is the author of several books on classical and contemporary Islamic thought. He holds the UNESCO chair in comparative religions from 1999 to 2003. He is also a member of the Higher Authority for Realisation of the Objectives of the Revolution, Political Reform and Democratic Transition in 2011 and president of the Tunisian Academy of Sciences, Letters, and Arts since 2015.
	Slim Laghmani	Professor of public law and political science at the Faculty of Juridical Sciences in Tunis, he is the director of the research laboratory "European Union Law and Maghreb-Europe Relations" from 2001 to 2013. He is the author of several books on the question of law, religion and modernity. He is a member of the committee of experts within the Higher Authority for Realisation of the Objectives of the Revolution, Political Reform and Democratic Transition and chairman of its subcommittee on civil liberties. He is currently president of the Tunisian Association of Constitutional Law and member of the scientific council of the Académie Internationale de Droit Constitutionnel.
	Salwa Hamrouni	Associate lecturer in public law at the Faculty of Legal, Political and Social Sciences of Tunis, at the Carthage University, she is a specialist in international human rights law and constitutional law. Her research focuses on issues of rights and freedoms in Tunisian law and international law. She is a member of the drafting committee of the Constitutional Court Act. She is also an expert and consultant on human rights with several national and international organizations such as UNESCO, United Nations Development Programme and Lawyers Without Borders.
	Slaheddine Jourchi	Writer and activist for human rights, he is the president of the National Civil Council and was vice-president of the Tunisian Human Rights League and founding member of the Al Jahedh Forum, an association aimed to promote an innovative Arab-Islamic thinking and consolidating national identity.
	Iqbal Gharbi	Academic and director of the chair of anthropology of religion at the Higher Institute of Theology and Center for Pedagogical Innovation at University of Ez-Zitouna, she holds a PhD in anthropology from the Paris Descartes University. She is responsible for the scientific review of the Higher Institute of Theology, Ettanwir.
	Malek Ghazouani	He is a magistrate and vice-president of the Tunis Court of First Instance.
	Dora Bouchoucha	Professor of English literature, film producer and educational leader of several African and Arab producers training bodies, she is the director of the Carthage Film Festival for 3 sessions and initiated the Project workshop there in 1992. She is president of production support commissions in France between 2010 and 2013. She is elected among the 100 most influential people in Africa.

== Work of the committee ==
The work started since the first day, on the 14 August 2017, and the committee has drawn up an inventory of laws that undermine individual freedoms and equality and which are not in conformity with the Constitution and commitments of Tunisia in terms of human rights before entering in the proposal formulation phase.

Simultaneously, the committee has chosen to adopt a participative and consultative approach by inviting public life actors to contribute to the project. Through this approach, ministries, political parties represented in the Assembly of the Representatives of the People and government, specialized civil society organizations, academics specializing in several disciplines (sociologists, scholars of University of Ez-Zitouna, etc.) were consulted and their contributions helped to move the work of the committee forward significantly.
