= Chouftouhonna Festival =

Annual art festival in Tunis, Tunisia

Chouftouhonna Festival (Arabic: مهرجان شفتهن, romanized: mahrajān Shuftuhunna; meaning 'I have seen them [f.]') is a multidisciplinary festival dedicated to women artists, organized in Tunisia each year by the feminist association Chouf.

== Feminist Festival ==
The festival Chouftouhonna, and the association Chouf (or Chouf Minorities) aim to act for women's individual, corporal and sexual rights. The association is a self-managed feminist organization created in 2015 that defines itself as a "collective of audio-visual activists" that uses the arts to offer Tunisian women a space to speak. From 2015, the year of its creation, the association organizes the annual Chouftouhonna Festival (venue of the World Social Forum for that year), inviting people who identify as women to express themselves through artistic creation, to question the concept of gender.

== Multidisciplinary meeting ==
The festival is built to give a space of artistic expression to women and claim their rights. It offers a multidisciplinary program. Graphic arts, visual arts, photography, cinema, dance, theater, music, performances and readings. Chouftouhonna has become an artistic platform and a place for exchange and meetings for women artists.

== Festival editions ==
- The first edition of the festival took place in 2015
- 2016: Second edition of the festival Chouftouhonna from May 13 to 15 at Espace Mad'art, Carthage.
- 2017: Third edition from 7 to 10 September at the Tunisian National Theater, in the Medina of Tunis. This edition gathered 256 participants from 55 different countries.
- 2018: Fourth edition from 6 to 9 September, also at the Tunisian National Theater. It brought together more than 150 artists.
