= Sidi El Ansari Mosque =

Mosque in Tunis, Tunisia

- جامع سيدي الأنصاري
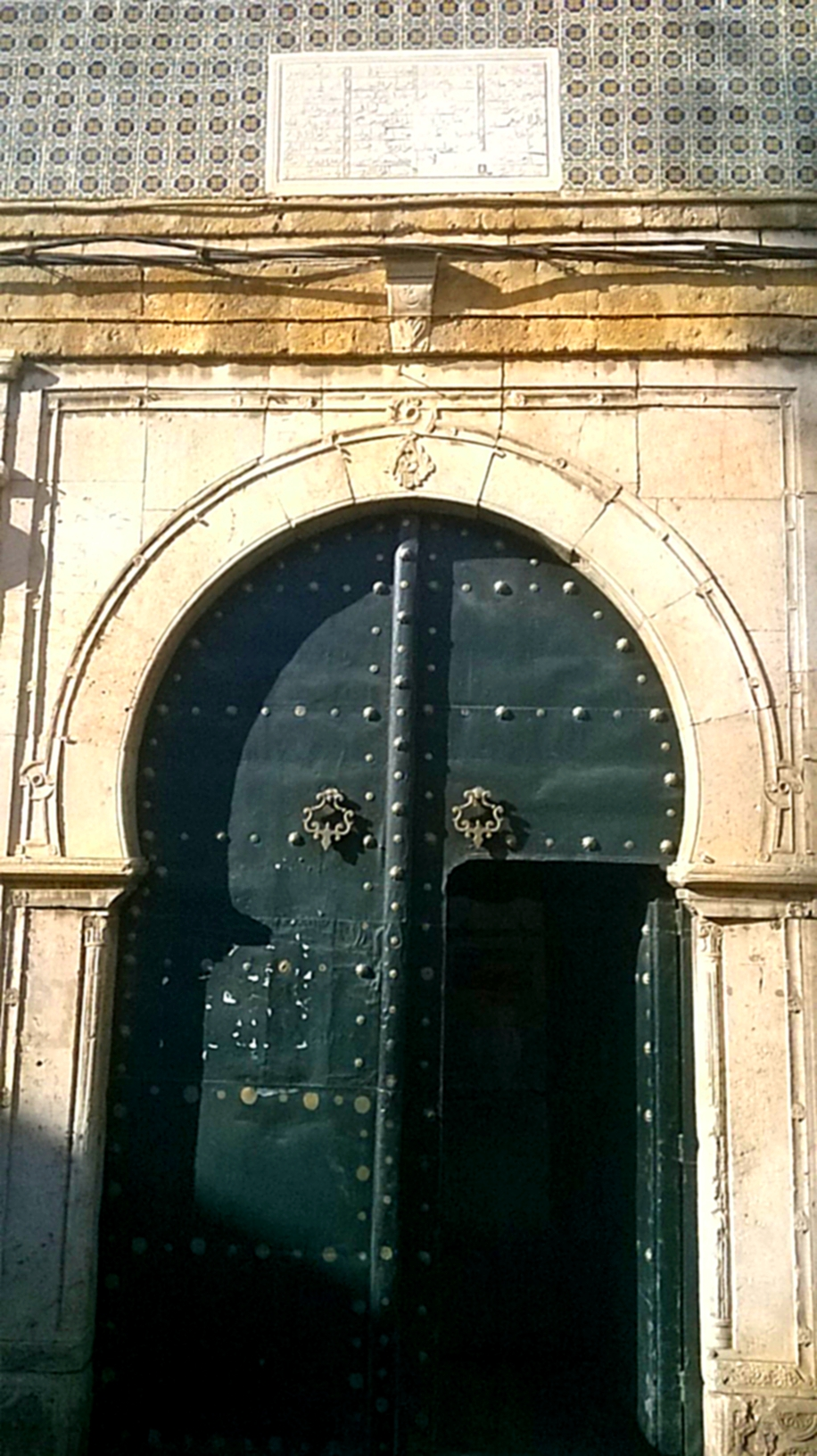

- Location within Tunisia

Religion
- Affiliation: Sunni Islam

Location
- Location: Tunis, Tunisia
- Interactive map of Sidi El Ansari Mosque
- Coordinates: 36.805466111111°N 10.16298°E

Architecture
- Type: Mosque

Sidi El Ansari Mosque (Arabic: جامع سيدي الأنصاري), is a Tunisian mosque located in the Kâadine hood in the north of the medina of Tunis near the Bab Souika suburb. It is annexed to a mausoleum.

== Localization ==
It can be found in 43 El Kâadine Street.

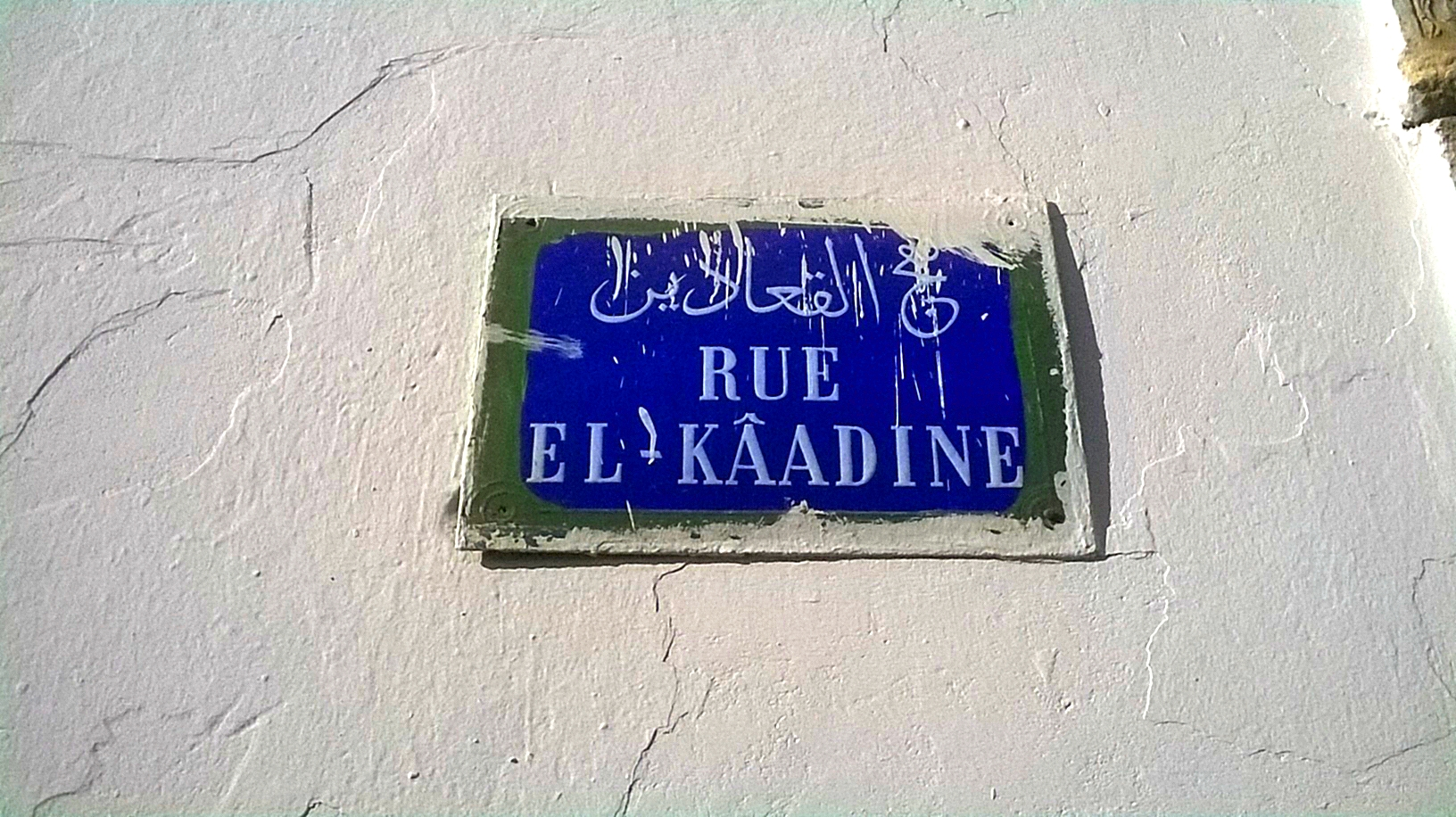
Metallic plaque of El Kâadine Street

== Etymology ==
The mosque got its name from a saint called Sidi El Ansari, a descending from El Rasâa family. He is buried in it.

== History ==
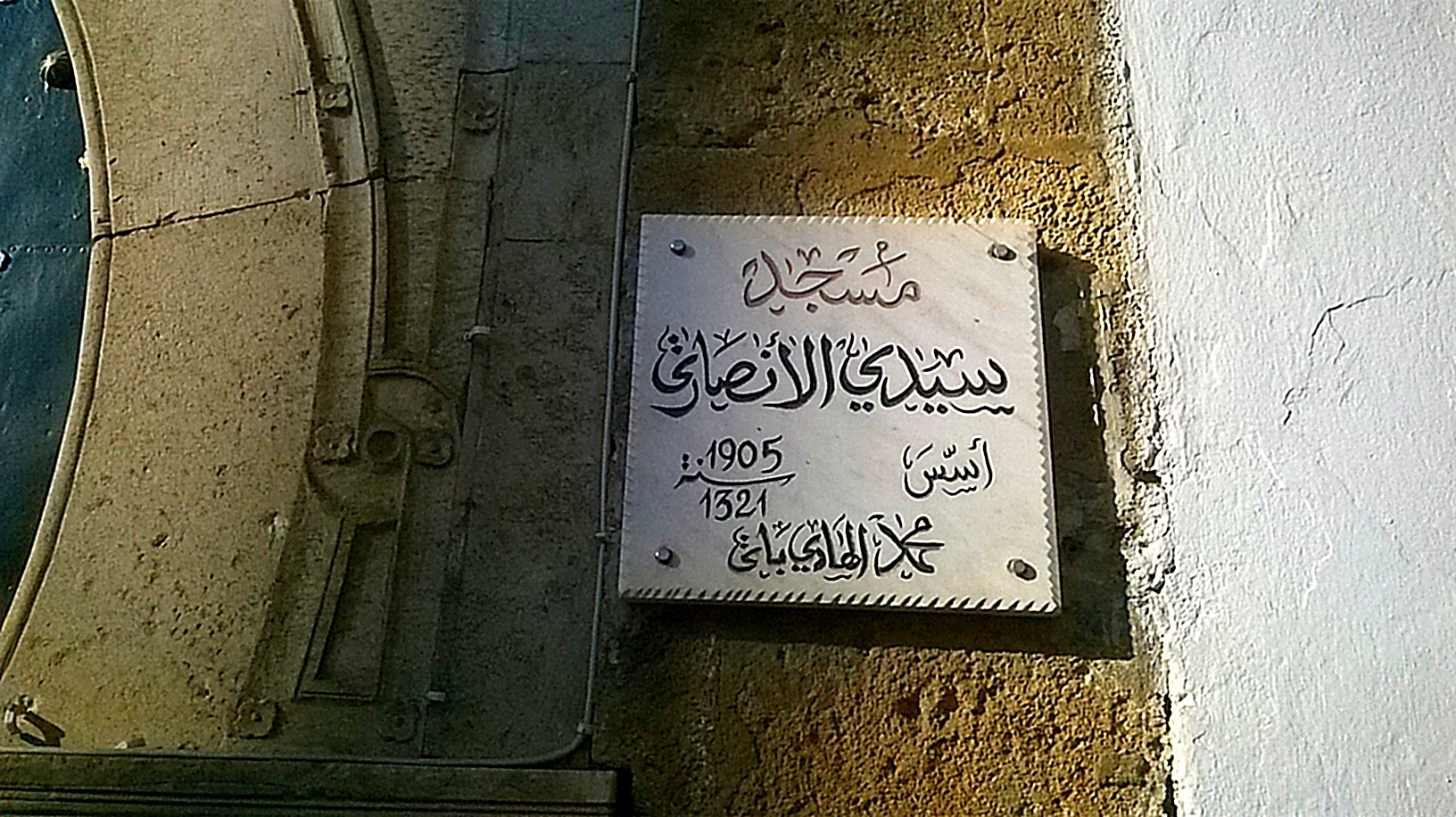
Commemorative plaque of the mosque

According to the commemorative plaque, it was built in 1905 under the orders of Muhammad IV al-Hadi, a bey of Tunis from the Husainid dynasty who ruled from 1902 until his death.
