= Tunisia =

Country in North Africa

Republic of Tunisia: الجمهورية التونسية (Arabic) al-Jumhūriyyah at-Tūnisiyyah
- Flag Coat of arms
- Motto: حرية، نظام، عدالة "Ḥurrīyah, Niẓām, 'Adālah" "Freedom, Order, Justice"
- Anthem: حماة الحمى "Humat al-Hima" (English: "Defenders of the Homeland")
- Capital and largest city: Tunis; 36°49′N 10°11′E
- Official languages: Arabic
- Local vernacular: Tunisian Arabic Minority Dialects : Jerba Berber (Chelha) Matmata Berber Judeo-Tunisian Arabic (UNESCO CR)
- Foreign languages: French and English (Note: English is taught from fourth grade, and there is a notable increase in its usage among the youth and a growing demand in the workforce.)
- Ethnic groups (2021): 98% Arabs; 1% Berbers; 1% Jews and others
- Religion: 99% Sunni Islam; 1% others (incl. Christians, Judaism, Shia Islam, and Baha’i)
- Demonym: Tunisian
- Government: Unitary presidential republic
  - President: Kais Saied
  - Prime Minister: Sara Zaafarani
- Legislature: Parliament
  - Upper house: National Council of Regions and Districts
  - Lower house: Assembly of the Representatives of the People

Establishment
  - Ancient Carthage: 814 BC
  - Roman Africa: 146 BC
  - Vandal Kingdom: 439
  - Exarchate of Africa: 591
  - Aghlabid Emirate: 800
  - Fatimid Caliphate: 909
  - Zirid Emirate: 972
  - Hafsid Sultanate: 1229
  - Beylik of Tunis: 15 July 1705
  - French protectorate: 12 May 1881
  - Independence and Kingdom: 20 March 1956
  - Republic declaration: 25 July 1957

Area
  - Total: 163,610 km^{2} (63,170 sq mi) (91st)
  - Water (%): 5.04

Population
  - 2024 census: ▲11,972,169
  - Density: 79/km^{2} (204.6/sq mi) (134th)
- GDP (PPP): 2025 estimate
  - Total: ▲$183.73 billion (84th)
  - Per capita: ▲$14,780 (111th)
- GDP (nominal): 2025 estimate
  - Total: ▲$56.290 billion (90th)
  - Per capita: ▲$4,530 (121st)
- Gini (2021): ▼33.7 medium inequality
- HDI (2023): ▲0.746 high (105th)
- Currency: Tunisian dinar (TND)
- Time zone: UTC+1 (CET)
- Date format: dd/mm/yyyy
- Calling code: +216
- ISO 3166 code: TN
- Internet TLD: .tn; .تونس

Tunisia, (Note: Pronunciation: UK: /tjuːˈnɪziə, -ˈnɪs-/, US: /-ˈniːʒə, -ˈniːʃə, -ˈnɪʒə, -ˈnɪʃə/; Arabic: تونس Tūnis, pronounced [tuː.nɪs]; French: Tunisie, pronounced [ty.ni.zi]) officially the Republic of Tunisia, (Note: Arabic: الجمهورية التونسية al-Jumhūrīya at-Tūnisīya; French: République tunisienne, pronounced [ʁe.py.blik ty.ni.zjɛn]. The native Arabic official name translates more closely to "Tunisian Republic", as does the commonly used French translation, but the English translation "Republic of Tunisia" is used in English even by the Tunisian government for official purposes (e.g., the designation used by the Tunisian embassy in Washington, D.C.)) is a country in the Maghreb region of North Africa. It is bordered by Algeria to the west and southwest, Libya to the southeast, and the Mediterranean Sea to the north and east. Tunisia also shares maritime borders with Italy through the islands of Sicily and Sardinia to the north and Malta to the east. It features the archaeological sites of Carthage dating back to the 9th century BC, as well as the Great Mosque of Kairouan. Known for its ancient architecture, souks, and blue coasts, it covers 163,610 km^{2} (63,170 sq mi), and has a population of 12.1 million. It contains the eastern end of the Atlas Mountains and the northern reaches of the Sahara desert; much of its remaining territory is arable land. Its 1,300 km (810 mi) of coastline includes the African conjunction of the western and eastern parts of the Mediterranean Basin. Tunisia is home to Africa's northernmost point, Cape Angela. Located on the northeastern coast, Tunis is the capital of the country, which is itself named after Tunis. The official language of Tunisia is Arabic. The vast majority of Tunisia's population is Arab and Muslim. Vernacular Tunisian Arabic is the most spoken language, and French serves as an administrative and educational language in some contexts, but has no official status.

Beginning in early antiquity, Tunisia was inhabited by the indigenous Numidian people who were later subsumed by the Amazighs or Berbers. The Phoenicians, a Semitic people, began to arrive in the 12th century BC, settling on the coast and establishing several settlements, of which Carthage emerged as the most powerful by the 7th century BC. The descendants of the Phoenician settlers came to be known as the Punic people. Ancient Carthage was a major mercantile empire and a military rival to the Roman Republic until 146 BC when it was defeated by the Romans who occupied Tunisia for most of the next 800 years. The Romans introduced Christianity and left architectural legacies like the Amphitheatre of El Jem. In the 7th century AD, Arab Muslims conquered Tunisia and settled with their tribes and families, bringing Islam and Arab culture. A large battle in 702 against the army led by the Berber Princess Kahina accelerated the demise of the Berbers and their eventual conversion to Islam. A later large-scale Arab migration of Banu Hilal and Banu Sulaym tribes in the 11th-12th centuries accelerated this process. By around the 15th century, the region of modern-day Tunisia had already been almost completely Arabised. Then, in 1546, the Ottoman Empire established control, holding sway until 1881, when the French conquered Tunisia. In 1956, Tunisia gained independence as the Tunisian Republic. Today, Tunisia's culture and identity are rooted in this centuries-long intersection of different cultures and ethnicities.

In 2011, the Tunisian Revolution, which was triggered by dissatisfaction with the lack of freedom and democracy under the 24-year rule of President Zine El Abidine Ben Ali, overthrew his regime and catalyzed the broader Arab Spring movement across the region. Free multiparty parliamentary elections were held shortly thereafter; the country again voted for parliament on 26 October 2014, and for president on 23 November 2014. From 2014 to 2020, it was considered the only democratic state in the Arab world, according to The Economist Democracy Index. (Note: Lebanon and Iraq are confessional democracies.) After democratic backsliding under President Kais Saied, Tunisia was rated a hybrid regime in 2022 and as of 2025 it no longer has free and fair elections according to Freedom House. It is one of the few countries in Africa ranking high on the Human Development Index, with one of the highest per capita incomes on the continent, ranking 129th in GDP per capita income.

Tunisia is well integrated into the international community. It is a member of the United Nations, Organisation internationale de la Francophonie, the Arab League, the Organisation of Islamic Cooperation, the African Union, the Common Market for Eastern and Southern Africa, the Non-Aligned Movement, the International Criminal Court, the Group of 77, among others. It maintains close economic and political relations with some European countries, particularly with France and Italy, due to their geographical proximity. Tunisia also has an association agreement with the European Union and has attained the status of a major non-NATO ally of the United States.

== Etymology ==
The word Tunisia is derived from Tunis, a central urban hub and the capital of modern-day Tunisia. The present form of the name, with its Latinate suffix -ia, evolved from French Tunisie, in turn generally associated with the Berber root ⵜⵏⵙ, transcribed tns, which means "to lay down" or "encampment". It is sometimes also associated with the Carthage goddess Tanith (or Tunit), and the ancient city of Tynes.

The French derivative Tunisie was adopted in some European languages with slight modifications, introducing a distinctive name to designate the country. Other languages have left the name untouched, such as the Russian Туни́с (Tunís) and Spanish Túnez. In this case, the same name is used for both country and city, as with the Arabic تونس, and only by context can one tell the difference.

In English, Tunisia before independence was also often called simply "Tunis", a name that persisted until the 1940s; (Note: The Encyclopædia Britannica reads "TUNIS, Regency of, formerly one of the Barbary states of north Africa, but since 1881 a dependency of France,..." in its 1875–1889 ninth edition, but a 1902–1903 supplement (the tenth edition) and its celebrated eleventh edition (which reads "TUNISIA (Regency of Tunis), a country of North Africa, under the protection of France,..."). The New International Encyclopedia 1905 and 1916 editions read "TUNIS (Fr. Tunisie). A French protectorate in North Africa.", while the 1928 supplement reads "TUNIS or Tunisia. A French protectorate in North Africa...") under French influence, the neologism "Tunisia", adapted from Tunisie, gradually took hold. The adjective "Tunisian" first appeared in English in 1825; the previous adjectival form was "Tunisine".

== History ==
=== Antiquity ===
Farming methods reached the Nile Valley from the Fertile Crescent region about 5000 BC, and spread to the Maghreb by about 4000 BC. Agricultural communities in the humid coastal plains of central Tunisia then were ancestors of today's Berber tribes.

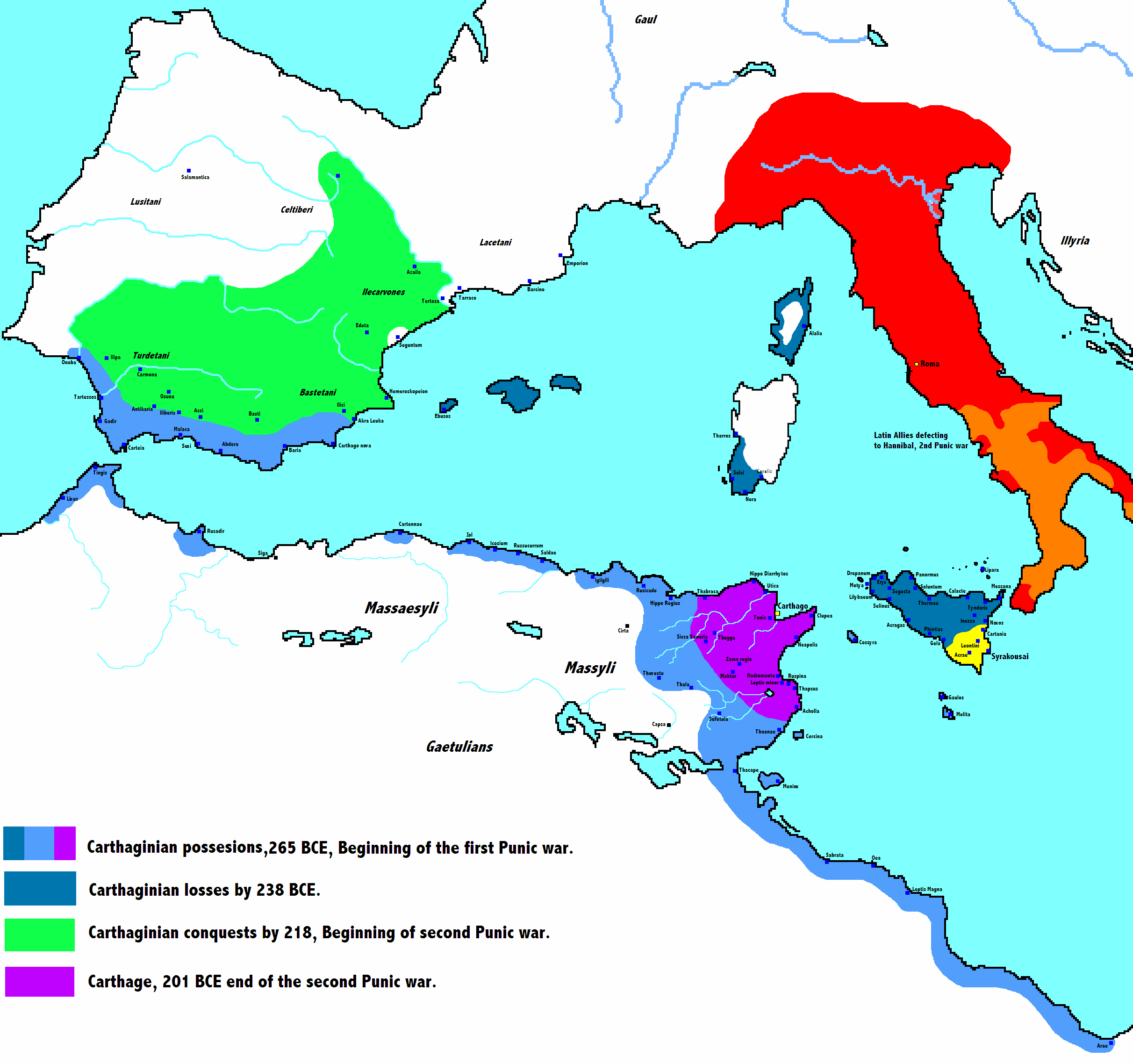
Carthaginian dependencies and protectorates through the Punic Wars

It was believed in ancient times that Africa was originally populated by Gaetulians and Libyans, both nomadic peoples. According to the Roman historian Sallust, the demigod Hercules died in Spain and his polyglot eastern army was left to settle the land, with some migrating to Africa. Persians went to the West and intermarried with the Gaetulians and became the Numidians. The Medes settled and were known as Mauri, later Moors.

The Numidians and Moors belonged to the race from which the Berbers are descended. The translated meaning of Numidian is Nomad and indeed the people were semi-nomadic until the reign of Masinissa of the Massyli tribe.

At the beginning of recorded history, Tunisia was inhabited by Berber tribes. Its coast was settled by Phoenicians starting as early as the 12th century BC (Bizerte, Utica). The city of Carthage was founded in the 9th century BC by Phoenicians. Legend says that Dido from Tyre, now in modern-day Lebanon, founded the city in 814 BC, as retold by the Greek writer Timaeus of Tauromenium. The settlers of Carthage brought their culture and religion from Phoenicia, now present-day Lebanon and adjacent areas.

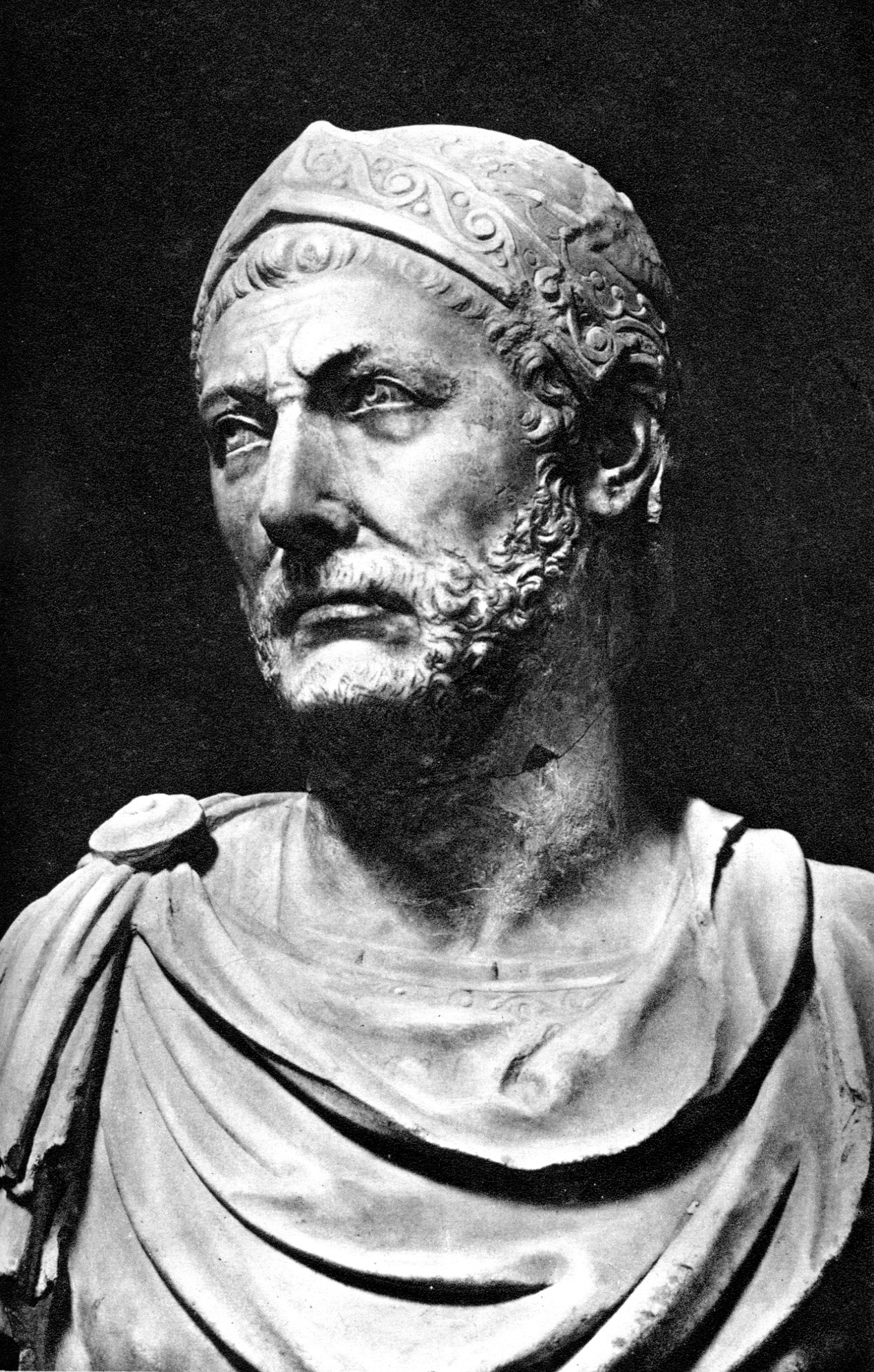
Statue of the Carthaginian general Hannibal Barca

After the series of wars with Greek city-states of Sicily in the 5th century BC, Carthage rose to power and eventually became the dominant civilization in the Western Mediterranean. The people of Carthage worshipped a pantheon of Middle Eastern gods including Baal and Tanit. Tanit's symbol, a simple female figure with extended arms and long dress, is a popular icon found in ancient sites. The founders of Carthage also established a Tophet, which was altered in Roman times.

A Carthaginian invasion of Italy led by Hannibal during the Second Punic War, one of a series of wars with Rome, nearly crippled the rise of Roman power. From the conclusion of the Second Punic War in 202 BC, Carthage functioned as a client state of the Roman Republic for another 50 years.

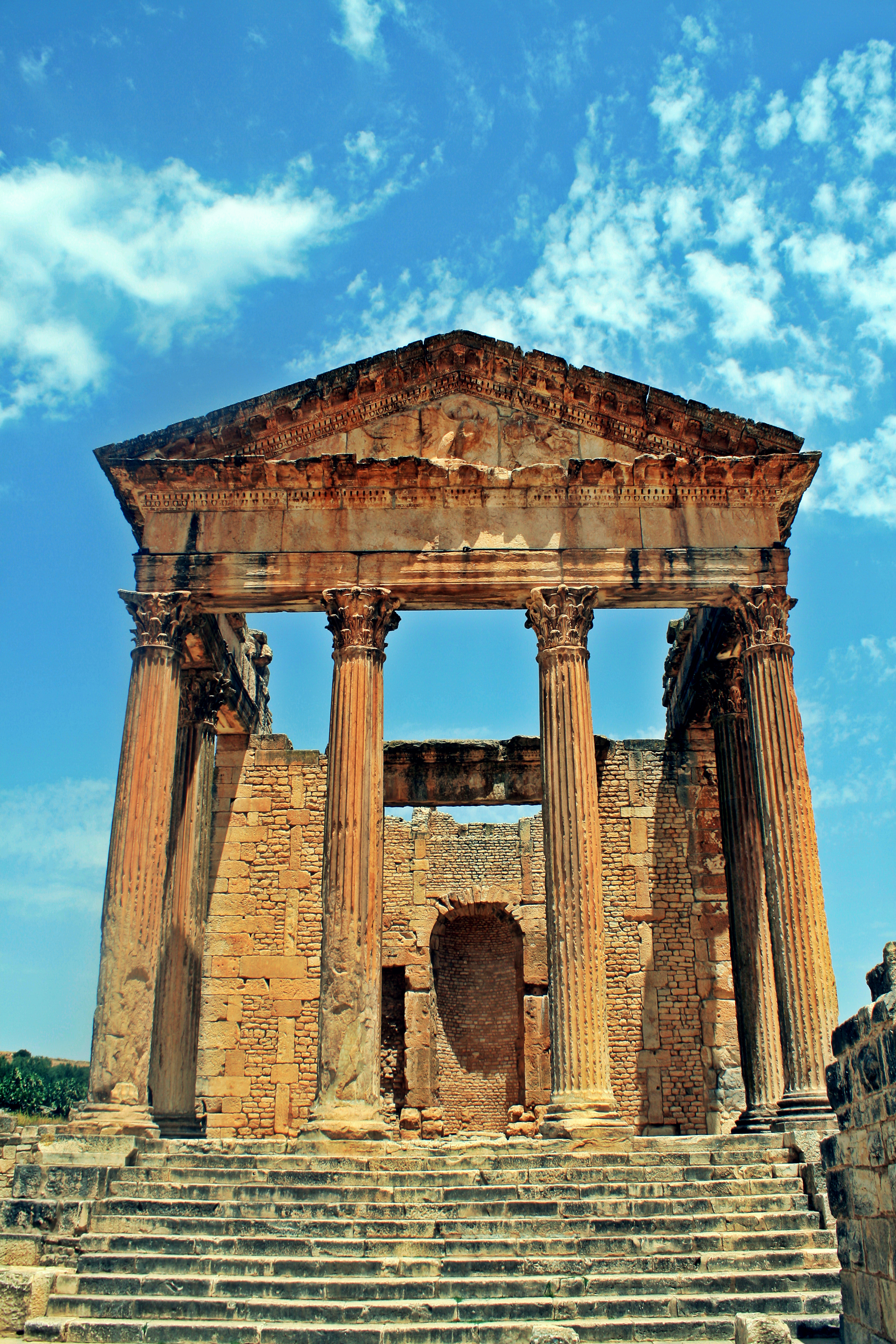
Ruins of a 2nd-century temple in Dougga, one of nine World Heritage Sites in Tunisia

Following the Battle of Carthage which began in 149 BC during the Third Punic War, Carthage was conquered by Rome in 146 BC. Following its conquest, the Romans renamed Carthage to Africa, incorporating it as a province.

During the Roman period, the area of what is now Tunisia enjoyed a huge development. The economy, mainly during the Empire, boomed: the prosperity of the area depended on agriculture. Called the Granary of the Empire, the area of actual Tunisia and coastal Tripolitania, according to one estimate, produced one million tons of cereals each year, one quarter of which was exported to the Empire. Additional crops included beans, figs, grapes, and other fruits.

By the 2nd century, olive oil rivaled cereals as an export item. In addition to the cultivations and the capture and transporting of exotic wild animals from the western mountains, the principal production and exports included textiles, marble, wine, timber, livestock, pottery such as African Red Slip, and wool.

There was even a huge production of mosaics and ceramics, exported mainly to Italy, in the central area of El Djem (where there was the second biggest amphitheater in the Roman Empire).

Berber bishop Donatus Magnus was the founder of a Christian group known as the Donatists. During the 5th and 6th centuries (from 430 to 533 AD), the Germanic Vandals invaded and ruled over a kingdom in Northwest Africa that included present-day Tripoli. The region was easily reconquered in 533–534 AD, during the rule of Emperor Justinian I, by the Eastern Romans led by General Belisarius, preluding a 165-year era of Byzantine rule.

=== Middle Ages ===
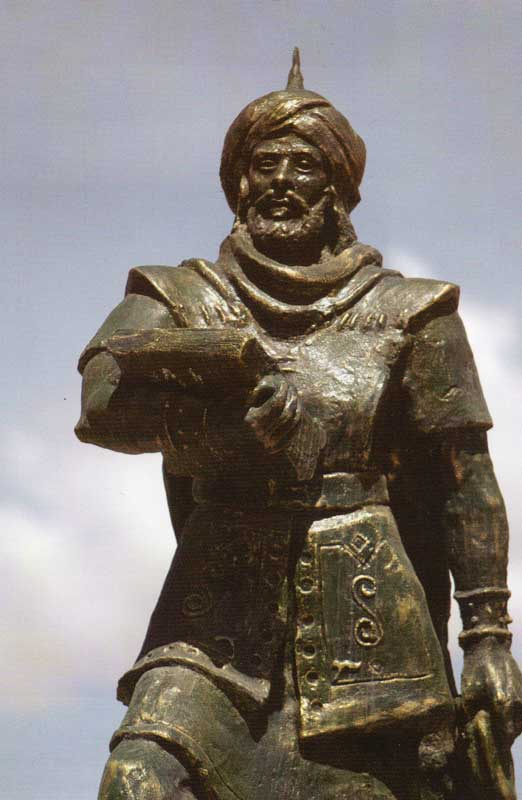
Uqba ibn Nafi led the Umayyad conquest of Tunisia in the late 7th century.

Sometime between the second half of the 7th century and the early part of the 8th century, Arab Muslim conquest occurred in the region. They founded the first Islamic city in Northwest Africa, Kairouan. It was there in 670 AD that the Mosque of Uqba, or the Great Mosque of Kairouan, was constructed. This mosque is the oldest and most prestigious sanctuary in the Muslim West with the oldest standing minaret in the world; it is also considered a masterpiece of Islamic art and architecture. The Arab migration to the Maghreb began during this time.

The region in its entirety was taken in 695, retaken by the Byzantine Eastern Romans in 697, but lost permanently in 698. The transition from a Latin-speaking Christian Berber society to a Muslim and mostly Arabic-speaking society took over 400 years (the equivalent process in Egypt and the Fertile Crescent took 600 years) and resulted in the final disappearance of Christianity and Latin in the 12th or 13th century. The majority of the population were not Muslim until quite late in the 9th century; a vast majority were during the 10th. Also, some Tunisian Christians emigrated; some richer members of society did so after the conquest in 698 and others were welcomed by Norman rulers to Sicily or Italy in the 11th and 12th centuries – the logical destination because of the 1200 year close connection between the two regions.

The Arab governors of Tunis founded the Aghlabid dynasty, which ruled Tunisia, Tripolitania and eastern Algeria from 800 to 909. Tunisia flourished under Arab rule when extensive systems were constructed to supply towns with water for household use and irrigation that promoted agriculture (especially olive production). This prosperity permitted luxurious court life and was marked by the construction of new palace cities such as al-Abbasiya (809) and Raq Adda (877).

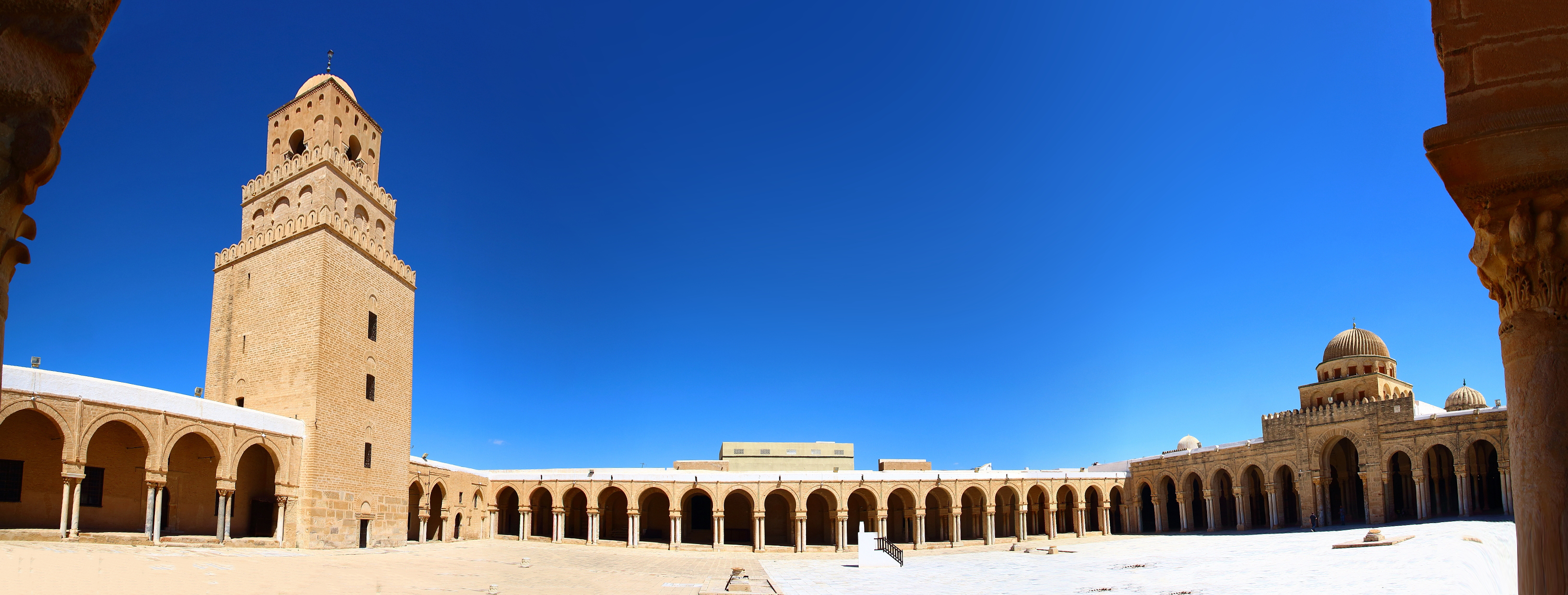
Domes of the Great Mosque of Kairouan. Founded in 670, it dates in its present form largely from the Aghlabid period (9th century). It is the oldest mosque in the Maghreb.

After conquering Cairo, the Fatimids abandoned Tunisia and parts of Eastern Algeria to the local Zirids (972–1148). Zirid Tunisia flourished in many areas: agriculture, industry, trade, and religious and secular learning. Management by the later Zirid emirs was neglectful though, and political instability was connected to the decline of Tunisian trade and agriculture.

The depredation of the Tunisian campaigns by the Banu Hilal, a warlike Arab tribe encouraged by the Fatimids of Egypt to seize Northwest Africa, sent the region's rural and urban economic life into further decline. Consequently, the region underwent rapid urbanisation as famines depopulated the countryside and industry shifted from agriculture to manufactures. The Arab historian Ibn Khaldun wrote that the lands ravaged by Banu Hilal invaders had become completely arid desert.

The main Tunisian cities were conquered by the Normans of Sicily under the Kingdom of Africa in the 12th century, but following the conquest of Tunisia in 1159–1160 by the Almohads the Normans were evacuated to Sicily. Communities of Tunisian Christians would still exist in Nefzaoua up to the 14th century. The Almohads initially ruled over Tunisia through a governor, usually a near relative of the Caliph. Despite the prestige of the new masters, the country was still unruly, with continuous rioting and fighting between the townsfolk and wandering Arabs and Turks, the latter being subjects of the Muslim Armenian adventurer Karakush. Also, Tunisia was occupied by Ayyubids between 1182 and 1183 and again between 1184 and 1187.

The greatest threat to Almohad rule in Tunisia was the Banu Ghaniya, relatives of the Almoravids, who from their base in Mallorca tried to restore Almoravid rule over the Maghreb. Around 1200 they succeeded in extending their rule over the whole of Tunisia until they were crushed by Almohad troops in 1207. After this success, the Almohads installed Walid Abu Hafs as the governor of Tunisia. Tunisia remained part of the Almohad state, until 1230 when the son of Abu Hafs declared himself independent.

During the reign of the Hafsid dynasty from their capital Tunis, fruitful commercial relationships were established with several Christian Mediterranean states. In the late 16th century the coast became a pirate stronghold.

=== Ottoman Tunisia ===
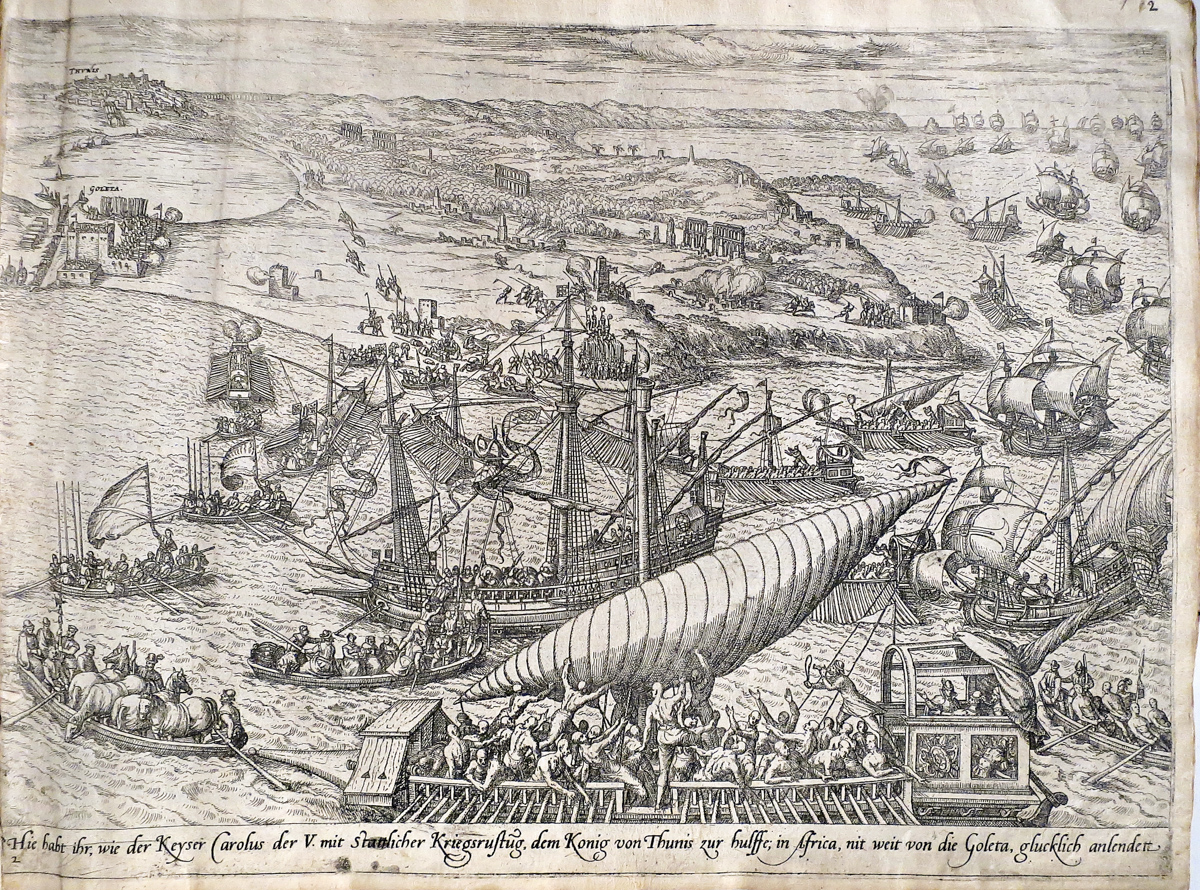
Conquest of Tunis by Charles V and liberation of Christian galley slaves in 1535

In the last years of the Hafsid dynasty, Spain seized many of the coastal cities, but these were recovered by the Ottoman Empire.

The first Ottoman conquest of Tunis took place in 1534 under the command of Barbarossa Hayreddin Pasha, the younger brother of Oruç Reis, who was the Kapudan Pasha of the Ottoman Fleet during the reign of Suleiman the Magnificent. However, it was not until the final Ottoman reconquest of Tunis from Spain in 1574 under Kapudan Pasha Uluç Ali Reis that the Ottomans permanently acquired the former Hafsid Tunisia, retaining it until the French conquest of Tunisia in 1881.

Initially under Turkish rule from Algiers, soon the Ottoman Porte appointed directly for Tunis a governor called the Pasha supported by janissary forces. Before long, however, Tunisia became in effect an autonomous province, under the local bey. Under its Turkish governors, the beys, Tunisia attained virtual independence. The Hussein dynasty of beys, established in 1705, lasted until 1957. This evolution of status was from time to time challenged without success by Algiers. During this era, the governing councils controlling Tunisia remained largely composed of a foreign elite who continued to conduct state business in the Turkish language.

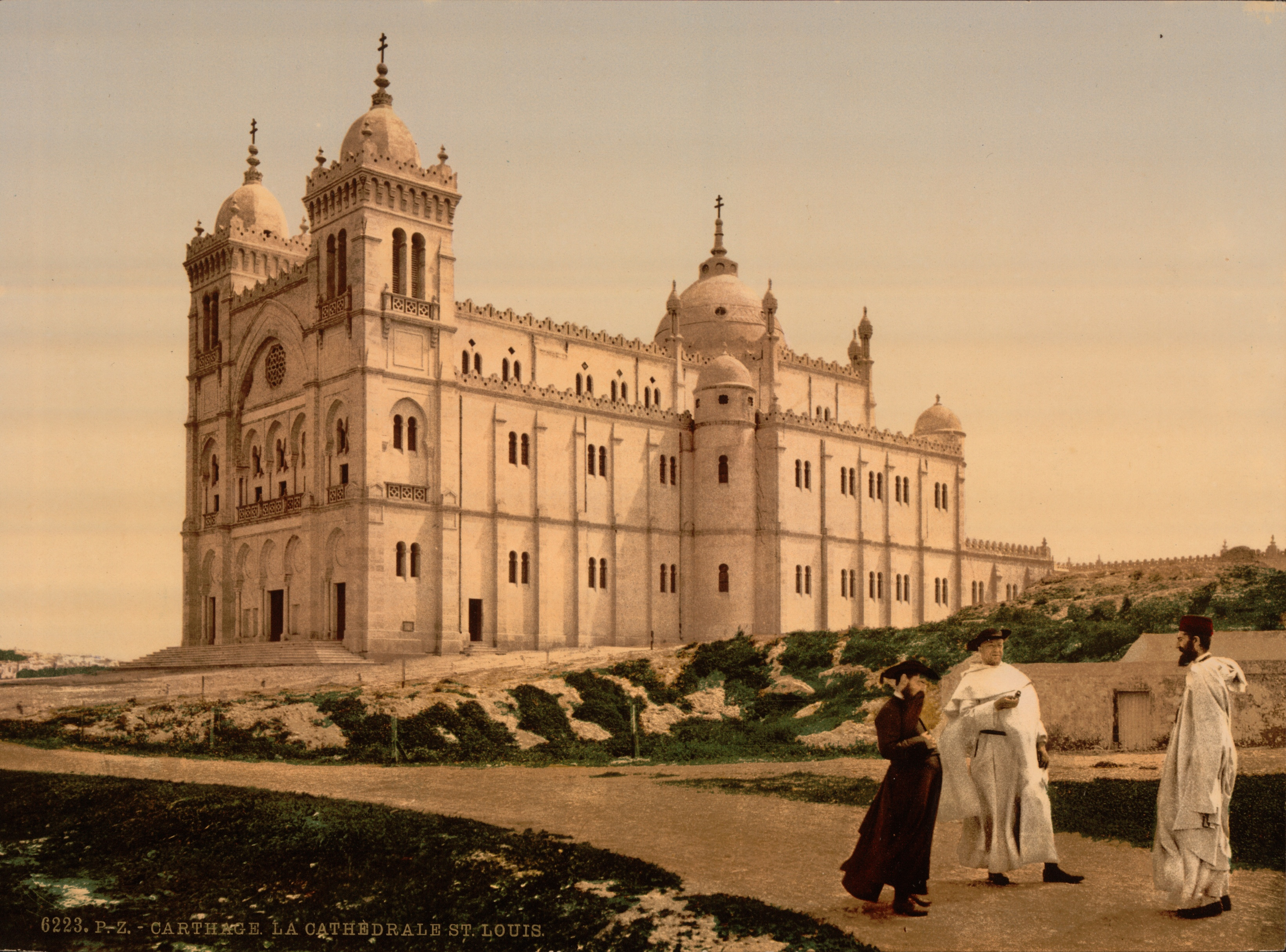
St Louis Cathedral – Carthage – Tunisia – 1899

Attacks on European shipping were made by corsairs, primarily from Algiers, but also from Tunis and Tripoli, yet after a long period of declining raids the growing power of the European states finally forced its termination.

The plague epidemics ravaged Tunisia in 1784–1785, 1796–1797 and 1818–1820.

In the 19th century, the rulers of Tunisia became aware of the ongoing efforts at political and social reform in the Ottoman capital. The Bey of Tunis then, by his own lights but informed by the Turkish example, attempted to effect a modernizing reform of institutions and the economy. Tunisian international debt grew unmanageable. This was the reason or pretext for French forces to establish a protectorate in 1881.

=== French Protectorate of Tunisia (1881–1956) ===
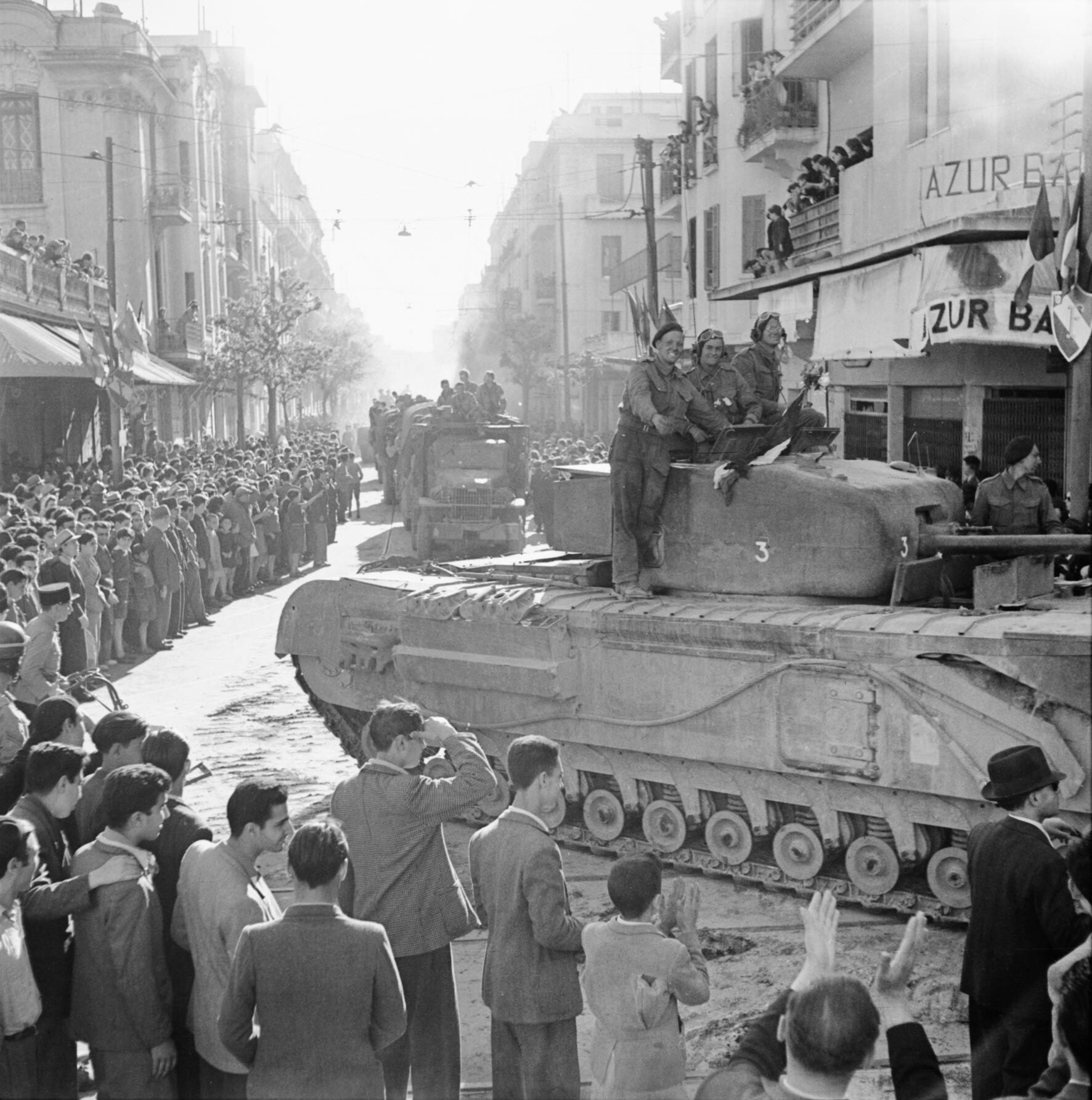
British tank moves through Tunis after the city was taken from Axis troops, 8 May 1943.

In 1869, Tunisia declared itself bankrupt and an international financial commission took control over its economy. In 1881, using the pretext of a Tunisian incursion into Algeria, the French invaded with an army of about 36,000 and forced the Bey of Tunis, Muhammad III as-Sadiq, to agree to the terms of the 1881 Treaty of Bardo. With this treaty, Tunisia was officially made a French protectorate, over the objections of Italy. European settlements in the country were actively encouraged; the number of French colonists grew from 34,000 in 1906 to 144,000 in 1945. In 1910 there were also 105,000 Italians in Tunisia.

During the Second World War, the protectorate of Tunisia was controlled by the collaborationist Vichy government in Metropolitan France. The antisemitic Statute on Jews enacted by the Vichy government was also implemented in Vichy-controlled Northwest Africa and other overseas French territories. Thus, the persecution and murder of the Jews from 1940 to 1943 was part of the Holocaust in France.

From November 1942 until May 1943, Vichy-controlled Tunisia was occupied by Germany. SS Commander Walter Rauff continued to implement the "Final Solution" there. From 1942 to 1943, Tunisia was the scene of the Tunisia Campaign, a series of battles between the Axis and Allied forces. The battle opened with initial success by the German and Italian forces, but the massive supply and numerical superiority of the Allies led to the Axis surrender on 13 May 1943. The six-month campaign of Tunisia's liberation from Axis occupation signalled the end of the war in Africa.

=== Struggle for independence (1943–1956) ===
After the liberation of Tunisia from the Germans, the French regained control over the government and made participation in a nationalist party illegal once more. Moncef Bey, who was popular amongst Tunisians, was deposed by the French. The French claimed that his removal was due to him being sympathetic to the Axis countries during German occupation, but the real reason is up for debate.

In 1945 after escaping French surveillance, Tunisian nationalist Habib Bourguiba arrived in Cairo. While there, he was able to make contact with the Arab League. Later in 1946, after traveling to other Middle Eastern countries, he made his way to the United States to speak to both the United Nations at their headquarters at Lake Success and U.S. State Department officials in Washington D.C., pleading the case of the Tunisian nationalists.

As part of postwar Tunisia, a new all-Tunisian labor organization was formed, the Union Générale des Travailleurs (UGTT). This was one of the stronger components of the nationalist group Neo-Destour.

Habib Bourguiba made his way to the United States on 13 September 1949. He attended the American Federation of Labor meeting in San Francisco, California. The French were opposed to his presence there, and the US feared political change in North Africa due to the looming presence of possible Soviet Union communist expansion.

Bourguiba continued to plead to foreign leaders when he traveled to Italy on 6 November 1951. His contacts included Alberto Mellini Ponce De León, Mario Toscano, and Licinio Vestri. De León was an old friend of Bourguiba who had helped free him from German captivity, Toscano was the head of the Ufficio Studi e Documentazione in the Ministry of Foreign Affairs, and Vestri was an Africanist scholar. Despite his best efforts, the Italians remained neutral as they did not want to ruin relations with NATO ally France, nor did they want to hamper any possibility of future relations with Tunisia as it served as a key part of the Mediterranean.

The French Resident General in Tunisia, Jean de Hautecloque left Tunis to go to Paris on 25 August 1953, when he was replaced by Pierre Voizard. Voizard had previously been the French Minister to Monaco. A month after his arrival in Tunis on 26 September 1953, Voizard made many changes to ease tensions in Tunisia. He lifted press censorship and freed several political prisoners. He also restored the full powers of civil authorities and raised the state of siege in the Sahel.

On 26 January 1954, Voizard announced that there would soon be new reforms in favor of granting more sovereignty to Tunisians while insuring the interests of the French and French citizens in Tunisia, at the Cercle Republicain d'outre Mer in Paris. The Neo-Destour group was not in favor of these reforms if they themselves were not involved in their creation. They also demanded the freedom of Bourguiba who was imprisoned on the Isle of Galete.

=== Post-independence (1956–2011) ===
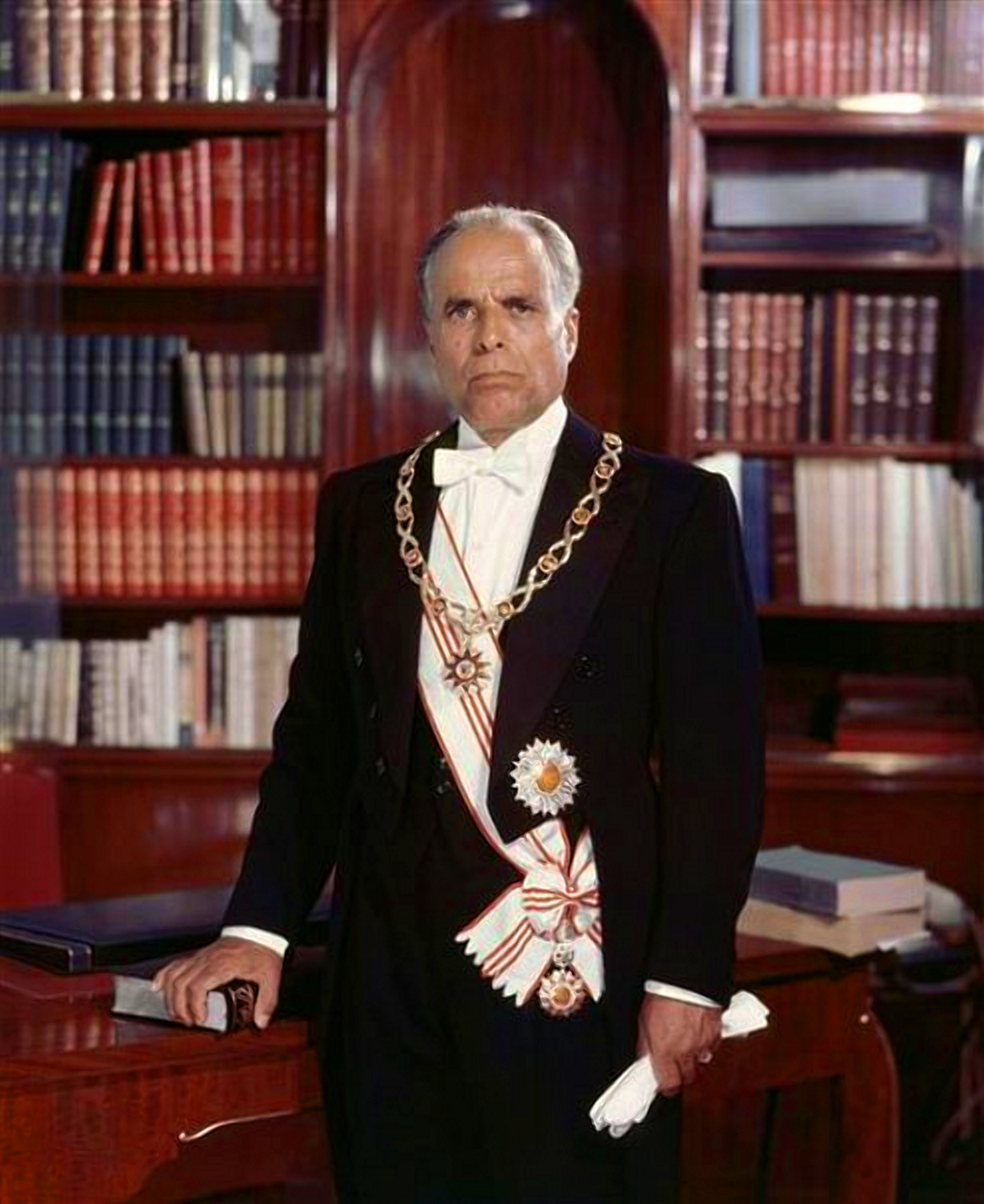
Habib Bourguiba was the first president of Tunisia, from 1957 to 1987.

Tunisia achieved independence from France on 20 March 1956 with Habib Bourguiba as Prime Minister. 20 March is celebrated annually as Tunisian Independence Day. A year later, Tunisia was declared a republic, with Bourguiba as the first President. From independence in 1956 until the 2011 revolution, the government and the Constitutional Democratic Rally (RCD), formerly Neo Destour and the Socialist Destourian Party, were effectively one. Following a report by Amnesty International, The Guardian called Tunisia "one of the most modern but repressive countries in the Arab world". On 12 May 1964, Tunisia nationalized foreign farmlands. Immediately after, France canceled all financial assistance for the country, which was to amount to more than $40 million. This led to the Tunisian National Assembly passing a bill that required all residents of the country to subscribe to a "popular loan" in proportion to their income. From 1977 until 2005, Tunisia was a shooting location for five films of the Star Wars film franchise.

In 1982, Tunisia became the center of the Palestine Liberation Organization, based in the capital Tunis. On 1 October 1985, the Israeli Air Force bombed the PLO Headquarters, killing at least 60 people.

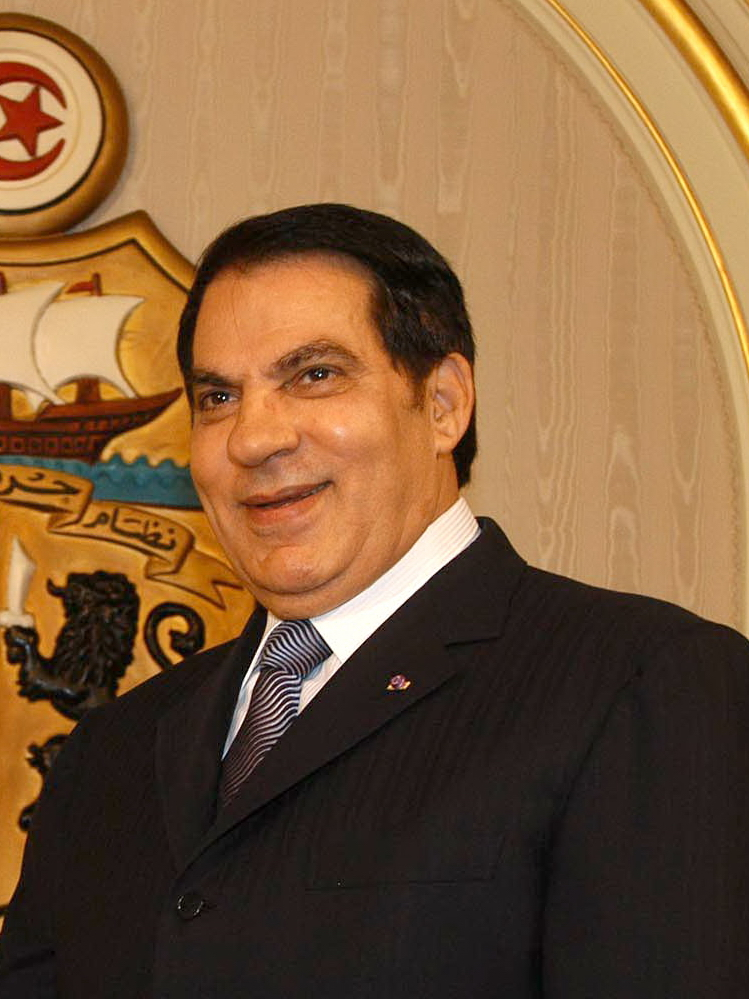
Zine El Abidine Ben Ali, president of Tunisia from 1987 to 2011

In November 1987, doctors declared Bourguiba unfit to rule and, in a bloodless coup d'état, Prime Minister Zine El Abidine Ben Ali assumed the presidency in accordance with Article 57 of the Tunisian constitution. The anniversary of Ben Ali's succession, 7 November, was celebrated as a national holiday. He was consistently re-elected with enormous majorities every five years (well over 80 percent of the vote), the last being 25 October 2009, until he fled the country amid popular unrest in January 2011.

Ben Ali and his family were accused of corruption and plundering the country's money. Economic liberalisation provided further opportunities for financial mismanagement, while corrupt members of the Trabelsi family, most notably in the cases of Imed Trabelsi and Belhassen Trabelsi, controlled much of the business sector in the country. The First Lady Leila Ben Ali was described as an "unabashed shopaholic" who used the state airplane to make frequent unofficial trips to Europe's fashion capitals. Tunisia refused a French request for the extradition of two of the President's nephews, from Leila's side, who were accused by the French State prosecutor of having stolen two mega-yachts from a French marina. According to Le Monde, Ben Ali's son-in-law was being primed to eventually take over the country.

Independent human rights groups, such as Amnesty International, Freedom House, and Protection International, documented that basic human and political rights were not respected. The regime obstructed in any way possible the work of local human rights organizations. In 2008, in terms of press freedom, Tunisia was ranked 143rd out of 173.

=== Post-revolution (since 2011) ===
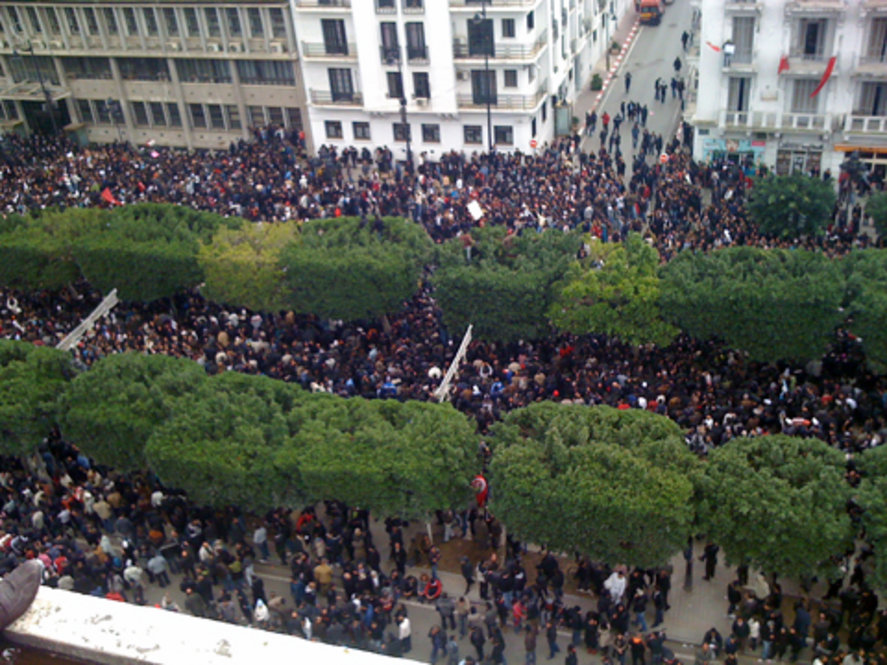
Tunis on 14 January 2011 during the Tunisian Revolution

The Tunisian Revolution was an intensive campaign of civil resistance that was precipitated by high unemployment, food inflation, corruption, a lack of freedom of speech and other political freedoms and poor living conditions. Labour unions were said to be an integral part of the protests. The protests inspired the Arab Spring, a wave of similar actions throughout the Arab world. The catalyst for mass demonstrations was the death of Mohamed Bouazizi, a 26-year-old Tunisian street vendor, who set himself afire on 17 December 2010 in protest at the confiscation of his wares and the humiliation inflicted on him by a municipal official named Faida Hamdy. Anger and violence intensified following Bouazizi's death on 4 January 2011, ultimately leading longtime President Zine El Abidine Ben Ali to resign and flee the country on 14 January 2011, after 23 years in power.

Protests continued for banning of the ruling party and the eviction of all its members from the transitional government formed by Mohammed Ghannouchi. Eventually the new government gave in to the demands. A Tunis court banned the ex-ruling party RCD and confiscated all its resources. A decree by the minister of the interior banned the "political police", special forces which were used to intimidate and persecute political activists.

On 3 March 2011, the interim president announced that elections to a Constituent Assembly would be held on 24 July 2011. On 9 June 2011, the prime minister announced the election would be postponed until 23 October 2011. International and internal observers declared the vote free and fair. The Ennahda Movement, formerly banned under the Ben Ali regime, came out of the election as the largest party, with 89 seats out of a total of 217. On 12 December 2011, former dissident and veteran human rights activist Moncef Marzouki was elected president. In March 2012, Ennahda declared it will not support making sharia the main source of legislation in the new constitution, maintaining the secular nature of the state. Ennahda's stance on the issue was criticized by hardline Islamists, who wanted strict sharia, but was welcomed by secular parties. On 6 February 2013, Chokri Belaid, the leader of the leftist opposition and prominent critic of Ennahda, was assassinated. In 2014, President Moncef Marzouki established Tunisia's Truth and Dignity Commission, as a key part of creating a national reconciliation.

Tunisia was hit by two terror attacks on foreign tourists in 2015, first killing 22 people at the Bardo National Museum, and later killing 38 people at the Sousse beachfront. Tunisian president Beji Caid Essebsi renewed the state of emergency in October for three more months. The Tunisian National Dialogue Quartet won the 2015 Nobel Peace Prize for its work in building a peaceful, pluralistic political order in Tunisia.

==== Presidency of Kais Saied (2019–present) ====
Tunisia's first democratically elected president Beji Caid Essebsi died in July 2019. Following him, Kais Saied became Tunisia's president after a landslide victory in the 2019 Tunisian presidential elections in October. On 23 October 2019, Saied was sworn in as Tunisia's new president.

On 25 July 2021, amid ongoing demonstrations concerning government dysfunction and corruption and rises in COVID-19 cases, Kais Saied unilaterally suspended parliament, dismissed the prime minister and withdrew immunity of parliament members. In September 2021, Saied said he would appoint a committee to help draft new constitutional amendments. (Note: The new constitution, which increased presidential powers, was passed in a referendum the following year with a turnout of only around 30%, amidst a widespread boycott.) On 29 September, he named Najla Bouden as the new prime minister and tasked her with forming a cabinet, which was sworn in on 11 October. On 3 February 2022, Tunisia was voted to the African Union's (AU) Peace and Security Council for the term 2022–2024, according to the Tunisian Foreign Ministry. The poll took place on the fringes of the AU Executive Council's 40th ordinary session, which was held in the Ethiopian capital of Addis Ababa, according to the ministry.

In February 2022, Tunisia and the International Monetary Fund held preliminary negotiations in the hopes of securing a multibillion-dollar bailout for an economy beset by recession, public debt, inflation, and unemployment.

In April 2023, the Tunisian government closed the headquarters of the Ennahda party and arrested its leader Rached Ghannouchi. In October 2023 Abir Moussi, head of the Free Destourian Party (FDL), became the latest prominent opponent of president Saied to have been detained or imprisoned. The FDL had emerged from the Democratic Constitutional Assembly.

In September 2023 Saied had asked to postpone a visit by a delegation of the EU commission to discuss migration according to Minister of the Interior Kamel Feki. Meanwhile, human rights organisations were criticizing the July migration agreement. Feki said that Tunisia, which is one of the most important transit countries for people on their way to Europe, cannot act as a border guard for other countries. In October 2023 Saied turned down 127 million in EU aid saying that the amount was small and doesn't square with a deal signed three months ago. This in turn caused surprise in Brussels. In April 2025, Tunisia dismantled dozens of makeshift camps housing African migrants, displacing as many as 7,000 people.

On 6 October 2024, President Kais Saied won a second term with more than 90% of the vote in a presidential election with a 28.8% turnout. Five political parties had urged people to boycott the elections.

== Geography ==
Köppen climate classification in Tunisia. The climate is Mediterranean towards the coast in the north, while most of the country is desert.

Tunisia is situated on the Mediterranean coast of Northwest Africa, midway between the Atlantic Ocean and the Nile Delta. It is bordered by Algeria on the west (965 km) and southwest and Libya on the south east (459 km). It lies between latitudes 30° and 38°N, and longitudes 7° and 12°E. An abrupt southward turn of the Mediterranean coast in northern Tunisia gives the country two distinctive Mediterranean coasts, west–east in the north, and north–south in the east.

Though it is relatively small in size, Tunisia has great environmental diversity due to its north–south extent. Its east–west extent is limited. Differences in Tunisia, like the rest of the Maghreb, are largely north–south environmental differences defined by sharply decreasing rainfall southward from any point. The Dorsal, the eastern extension of the Atlas Mountains, runs across Tunisia in a northeasterly direction from the Algerian border in the west to the Cape Bon peninsula in the east. North of the Dorsal is the Tell, a region characterized by low, rolling hills and plains, again an extension of mountains to the west in Algeria. In the Khroumerie, the northwestern corner of the Tunisian Tell, elevations reach 1,050 metres (3,440 ft) and snow occurs in winter.

The Sahel, a broadening coastal plain along Tunisia's eastern Mediterranean coast, is among the world's premier areas of olive cultivation. Inland from the Sahel, between the Dorsal and a range of hills south of Gafsa, are the Steppes. Much of the southern region is semi-arid and desert.

Tunisia has a coastline 1,148 kilometres (713 mi) long. In maritime terms, the country claims a contiguous zone of 24 nautical miles (44 kilometres), and a territorial sea of 12 nautical miles (22 kilometres). The city of Tunis is built on a hill slope down to the lake of Tunis. These hills contain places such as Notre-Dame de Tunis, Ras Tabia, La Rabta, La Kasbah, Montfleury and La Manoubia with altitudes just above 50 metres (160 feet). The city is located at the crossroads of a narrow strip of land between Lake Tunis and Séjoumi.

Tunisia was the eighteenth most water stressed country in the world in 2022.

Tunisia's climate is Mediterranean in the north, with mild rainy winters and hot, dry summers. The south of the country is desert. The terrain in the north is mountainous, which, moving south, gives way to a hot, dry central plain. The south is semiarid, and merges into the Sahara. A series of salt lakes, known as chotts or shatts, lie in an east–west line at the northern edge of the Sahara, extending from the Gulf of Gabes into Algeria. The lowest point is Chott el Djerid at 17 metres (56 ft) below sea level and the highest is Jebel ech Chambi at 1,544 metres (5,066 ft).

Tunisia is home to five terrestrial ecoregions: Mediterranean conifer and mixed forests, Saharan halophytics, Mediterranean dry woodlands and steppe, Mediterranean woodlands and forests, and North Saharan steppe and woodlands.

== Government and politics ==
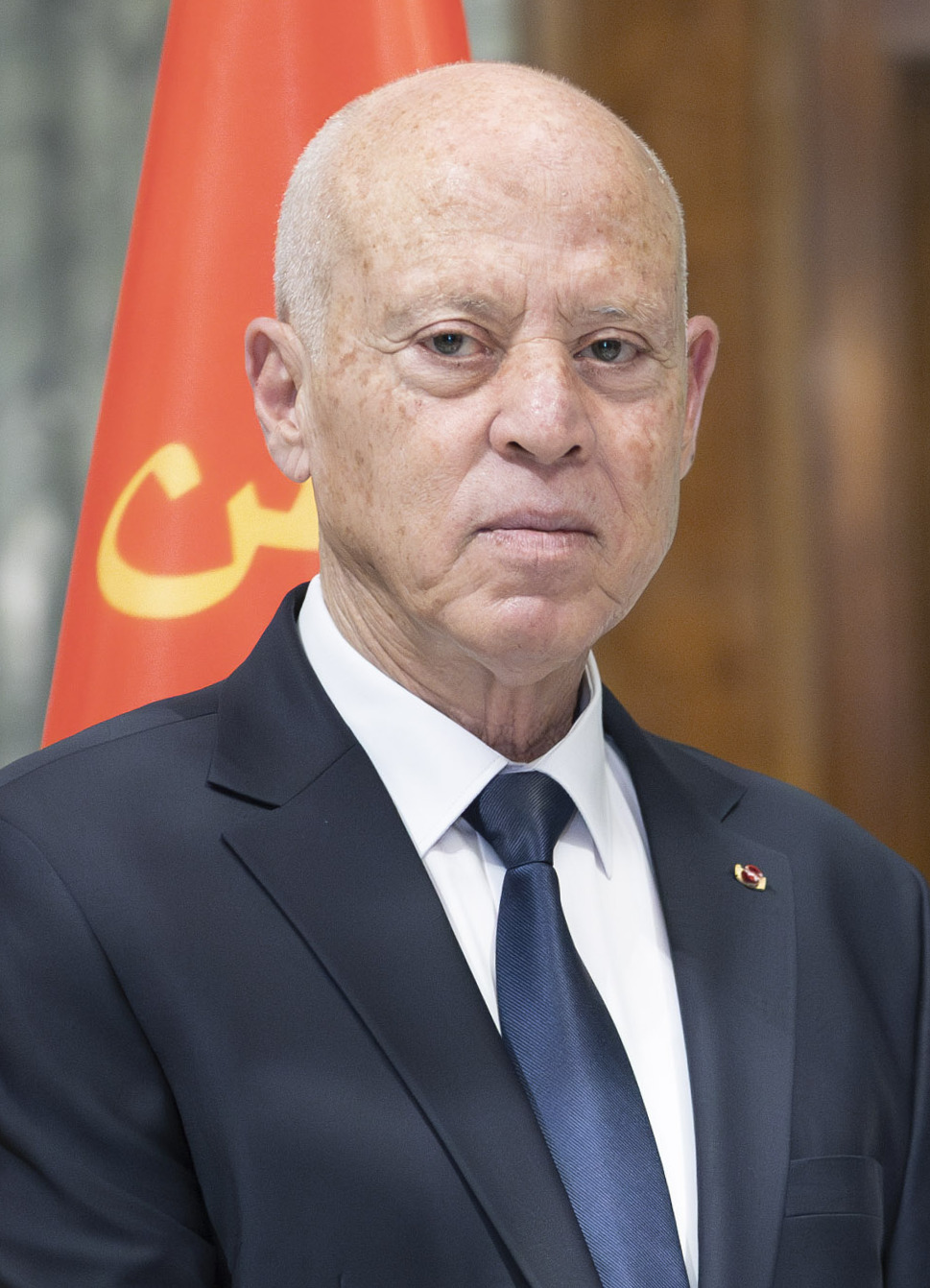
Kais Saied, President

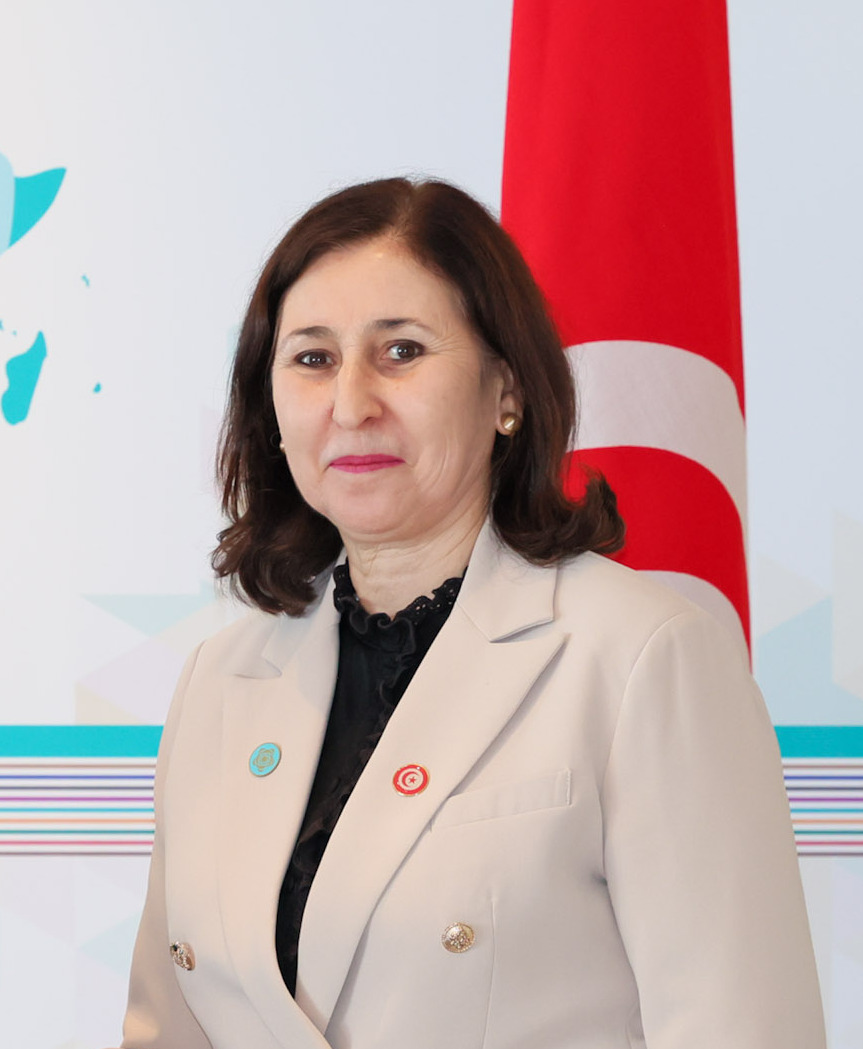
Sara Zaafarani, Prime Minister

Tunisia is a presidential republic with a president serving as head of state, a prime minister as head of government, a bicameral parliament, and a civil law court system. The Constitution of Tunisia, adopted 26 January 2014, guarantees rights for women and states that the President's religion "shall be Islam". In October 2014 Tunisia held its first elections under the new constitution following the Arab Spring. Tunisia was the only democracy in North Africa until 2021. After a democratic backsliding, the country now classifies as "hybrid regime" in the Democracy Index (The Economist). Between 2020 and 2022 the V-Dem Democracy indices score for electoral democracy dropped from 0.727 to 0.307. After the 2022 constitutional referendum, Tunisia became a unitary presidential republic.

The number of legalized political parties in Tunisia has grown considerably since the revolution. There are now over 100 legal parties, including several that existed under the former regime. During the rule of Ben Ali, only three functioned as independent opposition parties: the PDP, FDTL, and Tajdid. While some older parties are well-established and can draw on previous party structures, many of the 100-plus parties extant as of February 2012 are small.

Rare for the Arab world, women held more than 20% of seats in the country's pre-revolution bicameral parliament. In the 2011 constituent assembly, women held between 24% and 31% of all seats. Tunisia is included in the European Union's European Neighbourhood Policy (ENP), which aims at bringing the EU and its neighbours closer. On 23 November 2014, Tunisia held its first presidential election following the Arab Spring in 2011. The Tunisian legal system is heavily influenced by French civil law, while the law of personal status is based on Islamic law. Sharia courts were abolished in 1956.

A Code of Personal Status was adopted shortly after independence in 1956, which, among other things, gave women full legal status (allowing them to run and own businesses, have bank accounts, and seek passports under their own authority). The code outlawed the practices of polygamy and repudiation and a husband's right to unilaterally divorce his wife. Further reforms in 1993 included a provision to allow Tunisian women to transmit citizenship even if they are married to a foreigner and living abroad. The Law of Personal Status is applied to all Tunisians regardless of their religion. The Code of Personal Status remains one of the most progressive civil codes in North Africa and the Muslim world. On 25 May 2022, President Kais Saied issued a decree for change of constitution by 25 July. The referendum was held that day to a low turnout of 30% of voters, the overwhelming majority of whom accepted the new constitution, strengthening significantly the presidential powers. Maghreb countries have toughened their tone towards Europe recently.

=== Foreign relations ===
Tunisia maintains diplomatic relations with over 160+ countries. Former President Zine El Abidine Ben Ali has maintained its long-time policy of seeking good relations with the West, while playing an active role in Arab and African regional bodies. President Habib Bourguiba took a nonaligned stance but emphasized close relations with the European Union, Pakistan, and the United States.

=== Military ===
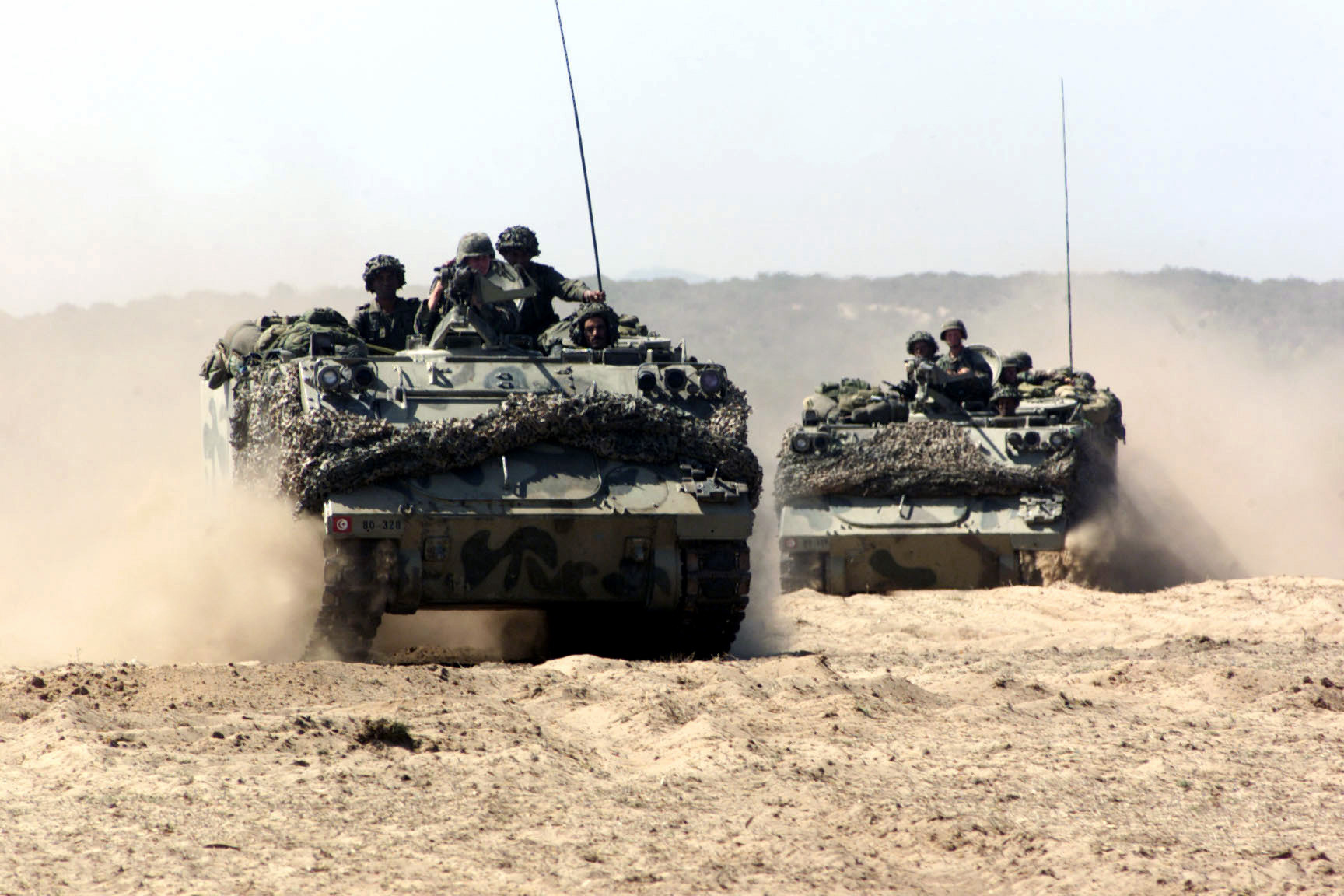
Tunisian military force

As of 2008, Tunisia had an army of 27,000 personnel equipped with 84 main battle tanks and 48 light tanks. The navy had 4,800 personnel operating 25 patrol boats and 6 other craft. The Tunisian Air Force has 154 aircraft and 4 UAVs. Paramilitary forces consisted of a 12,000-member national guard. Tunisia's military spending was 1.6% of GDP as of 2006. The army is responsible for national defence and also internal security. Tunisia has participated in peacekeeping efforts in the DROC and Ethiopia/Eritrea. United Nations peacekeeping deployments for the Tunisian armed forces have been in Cambodia (UNTAC), Namibia (UNTAG), Somalia, Rwanda, Burundi, Western Sahara (MINURSO) and the 1960s mission in the Congo, ONUC.

The military has historically played a professional, apolitical role in defending the country from external threats. Since January 2011 and at the direction of the executive branch, the military has taken on increasing responsibility for domestic security and humanitarian crisis response.

Tunisia is the 73rd most peaceful country in the world, according to the 2024 Global Peace Index.

=== Administrative divisions ===
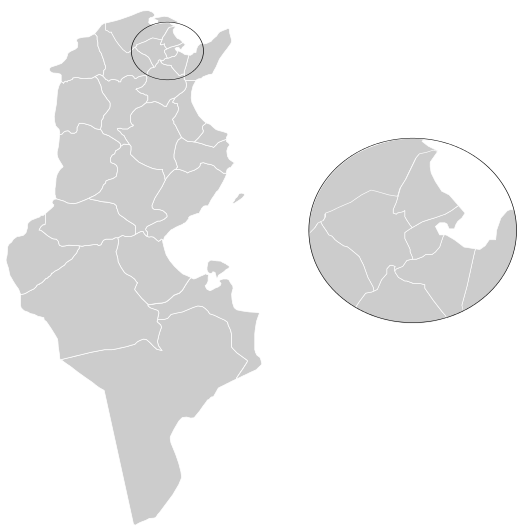

Tunisia is subdivided into 24 governorates (Wilaya), which are further divided into 264 "delegations" or "districts" (mutamadiyat), and further subdivided into municipalities (baladiyats) and sectors (imadats).

Largest cities or towns in Tunisia According to the 2014 Census
Rank	Name	Governorate	Pop.
1	Tunis	Tunis	1,066,961
2	Sfax	Sfax	341,999
3	Sousse	Sousse	314,071
4	Ettadhamen-Mnihla	Ariana	196,298
5	Kairouan	Kairouan	186,653
6	Gabès	Gabès	152,921
7	Bizerte	Bizerte	142,966
8	La Soukra	Ariana	129,693
9	Aryanah	Ariana	123,079
10	Sakiet Eddaïer	Sfax	113,776

== Economy ==
GDP per capita development of Tunisia

Ranked the most competitive economy in Africa by the World Economic Forum in 2009, Tunisia is an export-oriented country in the process of liberalizing and privatizing an economy that, while averaging 5% GDP growth since the early 1990s, has suffered from corruption benefiting politically connected elites. Tunisia's Penal Code criminalises several forms of corruption, including active and passive bribery, abuse of office, extortion and conflicts of interest, but the anti-corruption framework is not effectively enforced. However, according to the Corruption Perceptions Index published annually by Transparency International, Tunisia was ranked the least corrupt North African country in 2016, with a score of 41. Tunisia has a diverse economy, ranging from agriculture, mining, manufacturing, and petroleum products, to tourism, which accounted for 7% of the total GDP and 370,000 jobs in 2009. In 2008 it had an economy of US$41 billion in nominal terms, and $82 billion in PPP.

The agricultural sector accounts for 11.6% of the GDP, industry 25.7%, and services 62.8%. The industrial sector is mainly made up of clothing and footwear manufacturing, production of car parts, and electric machinery. Although Tunisia managed an average 5% growth over the last decade, it continues to suffer from a high unemployment rate, especially among youth.

The European Union remains Tunisia's first trading partner, currently accounting for 72.5% of Tunisian imports and 75% of Tunisian exports. Tunisia is one of the European Union's most established trading partners in the Mediterranean region and ranks as the EU's 30th largest trading partner. Tunisia was the first Mediterranean country to sign an Association Agreement with the European Union, in July 1995, although even before the date of entry came into force, Tunisia started dismantling tariffs on bilateral EU trade. Tunisia finalised the tariffs dismantling for industrial products in 2008 and therefore was the first non-EU Mediterranean country to enter in a free trade area with the EU.

The consequences of the Russian invasion of Ukraine for the global food supply are being felt particularly strongly in Tunisia.

In June 2023 the World Bank Group lent Tunisia $268.4 million to finance ELMED, an electrical interconnection project with Italy to import electricity generated from renewable energy sources to Sicily and the EU via a 600 Megawatt undersea cable.

Tunisia was ranked 76th in the Global Innovation Index in 2025.

=== Tourism ===
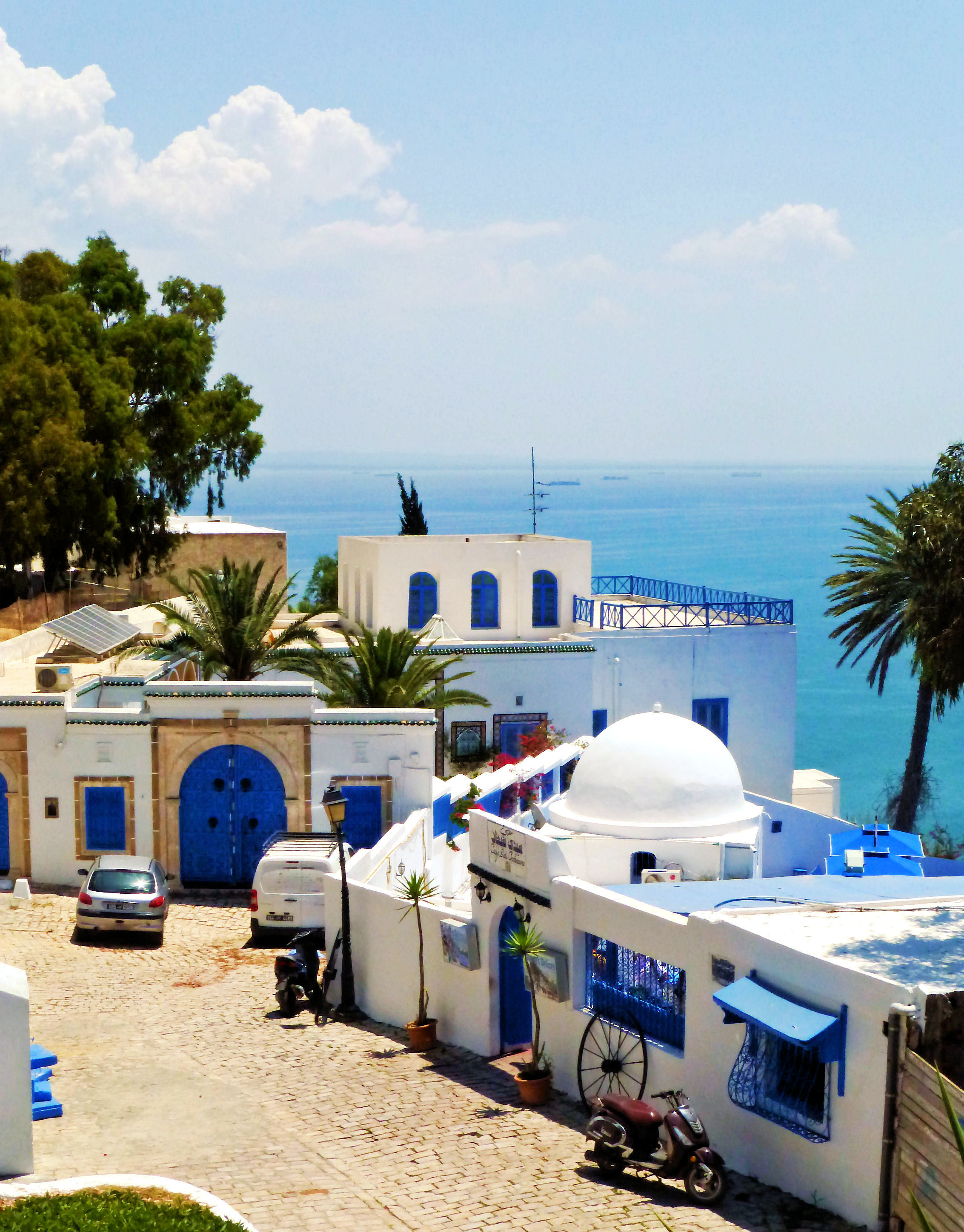
Sidi Bou Said

Among Tunisia's tourist attractions are its cosmopolitan capital city of Tunis, the ancient ruins of Carthage, the Muslim and Jewish quarters of Djerba, coastal resorts outside of Monastir, and the night life-driven city of Hammamet. According to The New York Times, Tunisia is "known for its golden beaches, sunny weather and affordable luxuries".

=== Energy ===
Sources of electricity production in Tunisia
1. Thermal steam (44.0%)
2. Combined cycle (43.0%)
3. Gas turbine (11.0%)
4. Wind, hydroelectric, solar (2.00%)

Tunisia's current power production capacity is estimated at 5,944 MW installed in 25 power plants as of 2024. Tunisia produced 19,520 GWh in 2022. State owned power utility company STEG (Société Tunisienne d'Electricité et de Gas) controls 92.1% of the country's installed power production capacity and produces 83.5% of the electricity.

Oil production began in 1966 in Tunisia. In 2006 there were 12 oil fields. The main field is El Borma. The production rate of crude oil in Tunisia was 29,200 barrels per day (4,640 m^{3}/d) at the end of September 2024.

Tunisia had plans for two nuclear power stations, to be operational by 2020. Both facilities are projected to produce 900–1000 MW. France is set to become an important partner in Tunisia's nuclear power plans, having signed an agreement, along with other partners, to deliver training and technology. As of 2015, Tunisia has abandoned these plans. Instead, Tunisia is considering other options to diversify its energy mix, such as renewable energies, coal, shale gas, liquified natural gas and constructing a submarine power interconnection with Italy.

According to the Tunisian Solar Plan (which is Tunisia's Renewable Energy Strategy not limited to solar, contrary to what its title may suggest), proposed by the National Agency for Energy Conservation, Tunisia's objective is to reach a share of 30% of renewable energies in the electricity mix by 2030, most of which should be accounted for by wind power and photovoltaics. As of 2015, Tunisia had a total renewable capacity of 312 MW (245 MW wind, 62 MW hydropower, 15 MW photovoltaics.)

=== Transport ===
The country maintains 19,232 kilometres (11,950 mi) of roads, with three highways: the A1 from Tunis to Sfax (works ongoing for Sfax-Libya), A3 Tunis-Beja (works ongoing Beja – Boussalem, studies ongoing Boussalem – Algeria) and A4 Tunis – Bizerte. There are 29 airports in Tunisia, with Tunis Carthage International Airport and Djerba–Zarzis International Airport being the most important ones. A new airport, Enfidha – Hammamet International Airport opened in 2011. The airport is located north of Sousse at Enfidha and is to mainly serve the resorts of Hamammet and Port El Kantaoui, together with inland cities such as Kairouan. Five airlines are headquartered in Tunisia: Tunisair, Syphax Airlines, Karthago Airlines, Nouvelair, and Tunisair Express. The railway network is operated by SNCFT and amounts to 2,135 kilometres (1,327 mi) in total. The Tunis area is served by a Light rail network named Metro Leger which is managed by Transtu.

=== Water supply and sanitation ===
Tunisia has achieved the highest access rates to water supply and sanitation services in the Middle East and North Africa. As of 2011, access to safe drinking water became close to universal approaching 100% in urban areas and 90% in rural areas. Tunisia provides good quality drinking water throughout the year.

Responsibility for the water supply systems in urban areas and large rural centers is assigned to the Sociéte Nationale d'Exploitation et de Distribution des Eaux (SONEDE), a national water supply authority that is an autonomous public entity under the Ministry of Agriculture. Planning, design, and supervision of small and medium water supplies in the remaining rural areas are the responsibility of the Direction Générale du Génie Rurale (DGGR).

In 1974, ONAS was established to manage the sanitation sector. Since 1993, ONAS has had the status of a main operator for the protection of the water environment and combating pollution. The rate of non-revenue water is the lowest in the region at 21% in 2012.

== Demographics ==
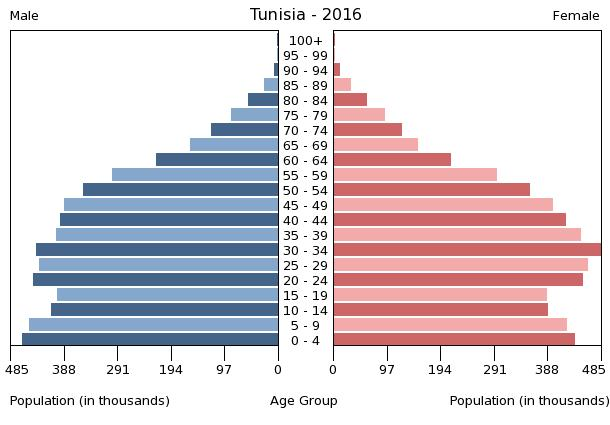
Population pyramid

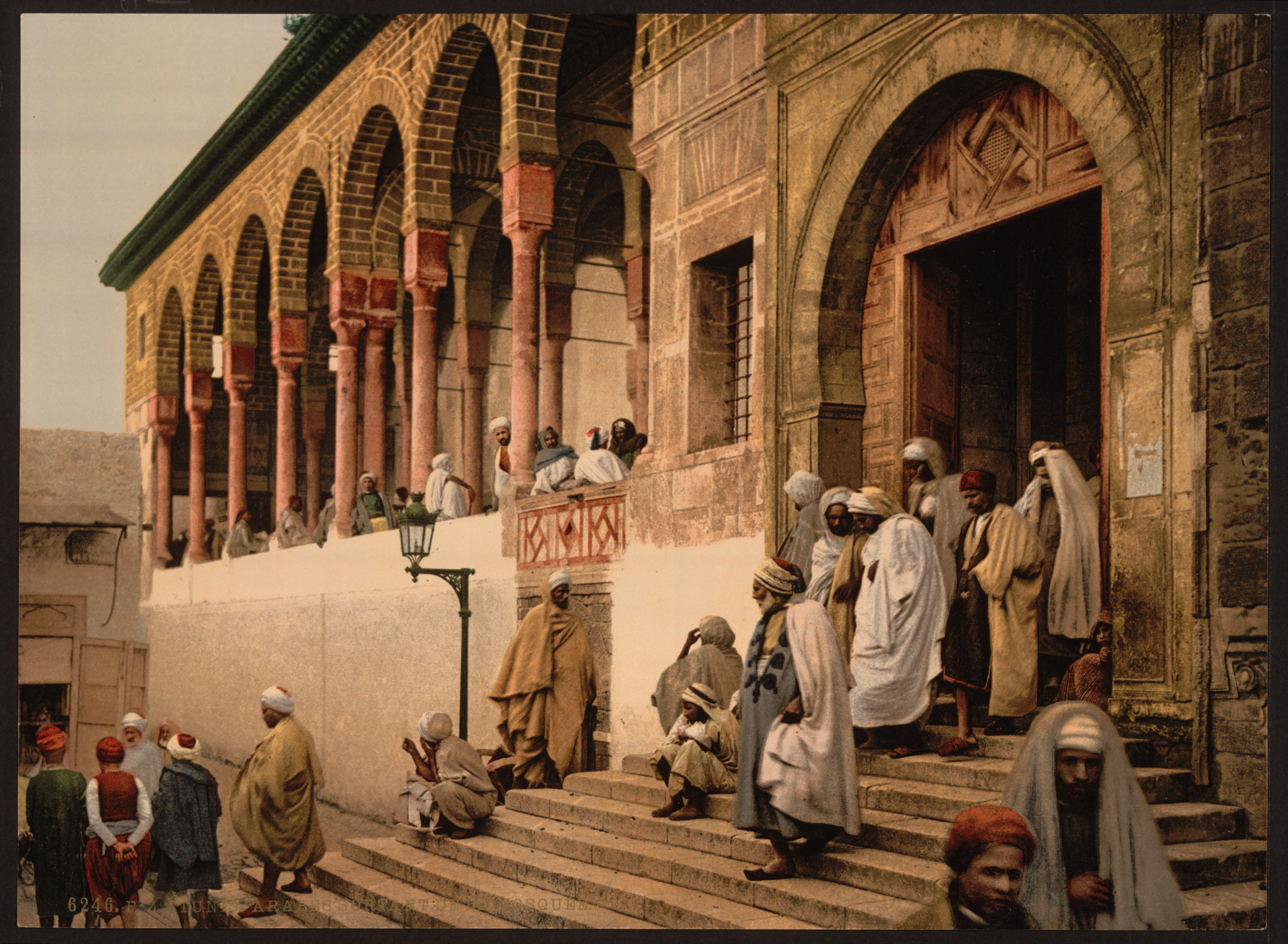
Attendees leaving mosque in Tunis c. 1899

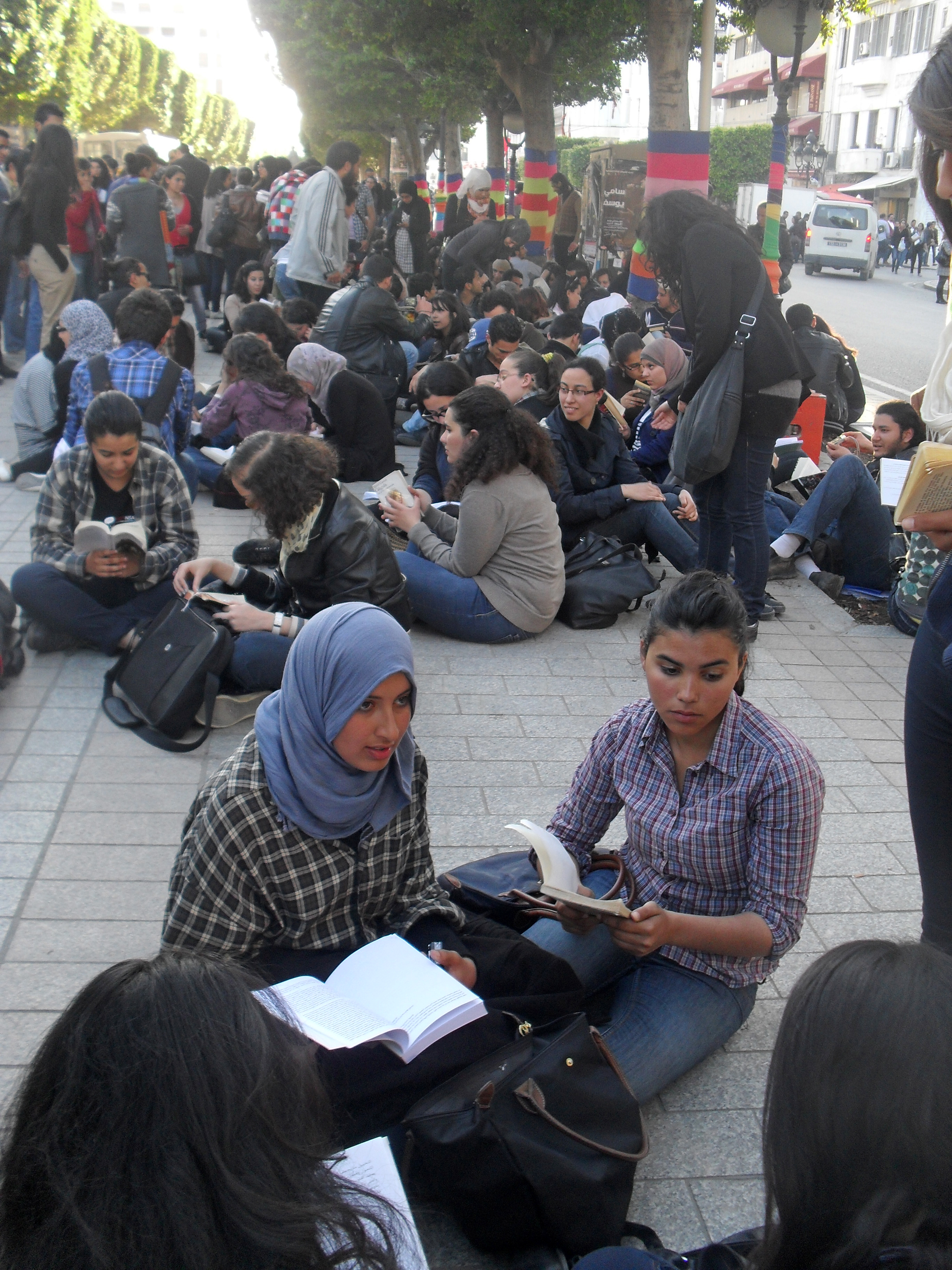
Tunisian students

According to the CIA, as of 2021, Tunisia has a population of 11,811,335 inhabitants. The government has supported a successful family planning program that has reduced the population growth rate to just over 1% per annum, contributing to Tunisia's economic and social stability.

=== Ethnic groups ===
According to the CIA World Factbook, ethnic groups in Tunisia are: Arab 98%, European 1%, Jewish and other 1%.

According to the 1956 Tunisian census, Tunisia had a population at the time of 3,783,000 residents, 95% consisting of Arabs and Berbers, 256,000 Europeans and 105,000 Jews. Speakers of Berber dialects were 2% of the population. According to another source, the population of Arabs is estimated to be 98%, and that of Berbers at 1%.

Black Tunisians make up 10–15% of the population and are mostly descended from sub-Saharan Africans brought to Tunisia as part of the slave trade.

Amazighs are generally concentrated in the Dahar mountains and on the island of Djerba in the southeast, and in the Khroumire mountainous region in the north-west. An important number of genetic and other historical studies point to the predominance of the Amazighs in Tunisia.

An Ottoman influence has been particularly significant in forming the Turco-Tunisian community. Other peoples have also migrated to Tunisia during different time periods, including West Africans, Greeks, Romans, Vandals, Phoenicians (Punics), Jews, and French and Italian settlers. By 1870, the distinction between the Arabic-speaking population and the Turkish elite had blurred.

From the late 19th century to the period after World War II, Tunisia was home to large populations of French and Italians (255,000 Europeans in 1956), although nearly all of them, along with the Jewish population, left after Tunisia became independent. The history of the Jews in Tunisia goes back some 2,000 years. In 1948, the Jewish population was estimated at 105,000, but by 2013 only about 1000 remained.

The first people known to history in what is now Tunisia were the Berbers. Numerous civilizations and peoples have invaded, migrated to, or have been assimilated into the population over the millennia, with influences of population from Phoenicians/Carthaginians, Romans, Vandals, Arabs, Spaniards, Ottoman Turks and Janissaries, and French. There was a continuing inflow of Arab tribes from the Arabian Peninsula.

After the Reconquista and expulsion of non-Christians and Moriscos from Spain, many Spanish Muslims and Jews arrived in Tunisia. According to Matthew Carr, "As many as eighty thousand Moriscos settled in Tunisia, most of them in and around the capital, Tunis, which still contains a quarter known as Zuqaq al-Andalus, or Andalusia Alley."

From the late 19th century to the period after World War II, Tunisia was home to large populations of French and Italians (255,000 Europeans in 1956), although nearly all of them, along with the Jewish population, left after Tunisia became independent. The history of the Jews in Tunisia goes back some 2,000 years. In 1948, the Jewish population was estimated at 105,000, but by 2013 only about 1000 remained.

=== Languages ===
Arabic is the official language of Tunisia. Tunisian Arabic, known as Tounsi, is the national, vernacular variety of Arabic used by the public. There is also a small minority of speakers of Berber languages known collectively as Jebbali or Shelha in the country. Actively spoken Berber languages are Jerba Berber on the island of Djerba and Matmata Berber in the city of Matmata. The Sened language is extinct. Speakers of Berber dialects were 2% of the population.

French also plays a major role in Tunisian society, despite having no official status. It is widely used in education (e.g., as the language of instruction in the sciences in secondary school), the press, and business. In 2022, there were 6,321,000 French-speakers in Tunisia, or about 52% of the population. Italian is understood and spoken by a small part of the Tunisian population. Shop signs, menus and road signs in Tunisia are generally written in both Arabic and French.

=== Religion ===
Religion in Tunisia (ARDA 2020 est.)
1. Sunni (97.5%)
2. Other Muslim (2.00%)
3. Christianity (0.20%)
4. None (0.27%)
5. Other (0.03%)

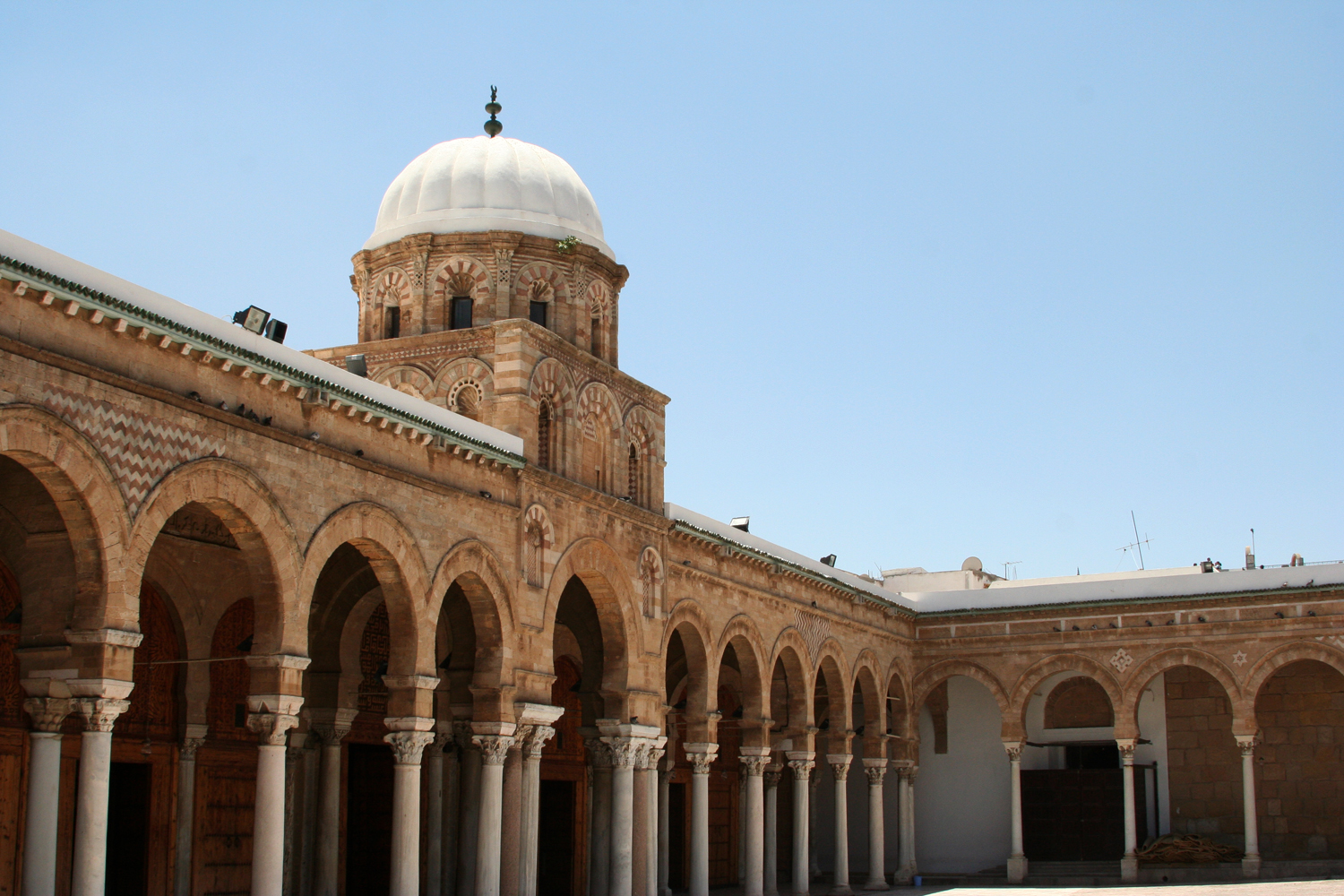
Al-Zaytuna Mosque in Tunis

Tunisia's constitution declares Islam as the official state religion—and the absolute majority of its population, or around 98%, report to be Muslims, while some 2% follow predominantly Christianity or Judaism. According to a 2018 survey conducted by the Arab Barometer, the vast majority of Tunisians (99.4%) continue to identify as Muslim. The survey also found that more than one third of Tunisians identify as non-religious. The percentage of Tunisians identifying themselves as non-religious has recently increased from around 12% in 2013 to around 33% in 2018, making Tunisia the least religious country in the Arab world. Nearly half of young Tunisians described themselves as non-religious, according to that same survey. However, as of July 2022, new surveys by the Arab Barometer say otherwise, particularly BBC's programme, The Newsroom journalists highlighting that the previously noted wave of those saying they were not religious has been, in fact, "reversed". The most recent 2021 Arab Barometer survey reported that 44% of Tunisians consider themselves religious, 37% somewhat religious, and 19% non-religious.

Tunisians enjoy a significant degree of religious freedom, a right enshrined and protected in its constitution, which guarantees the freedom of thoughts, beliefs and to practice one's religion. The country has a secular culture where religion is separated from not only political, but also public life. Individual Tunisians are tolerant of religious freedom and generally do not inquire about a person's personal beliefs.

The bulk of Tunisians belong to the Maliki school of Sunni Islam, and their mosques are easily recognizable by square minarets. However, the Turks brought with them the teaching of the Hanafi school during Ottoman rule, which still survives among families of Turkish descent today; their mosques traditionally have octagonal minarets. Sunnis form the majority, with non-denominational Muslims being the second largest group of Muslims, followed by Ibadite Amazighs.

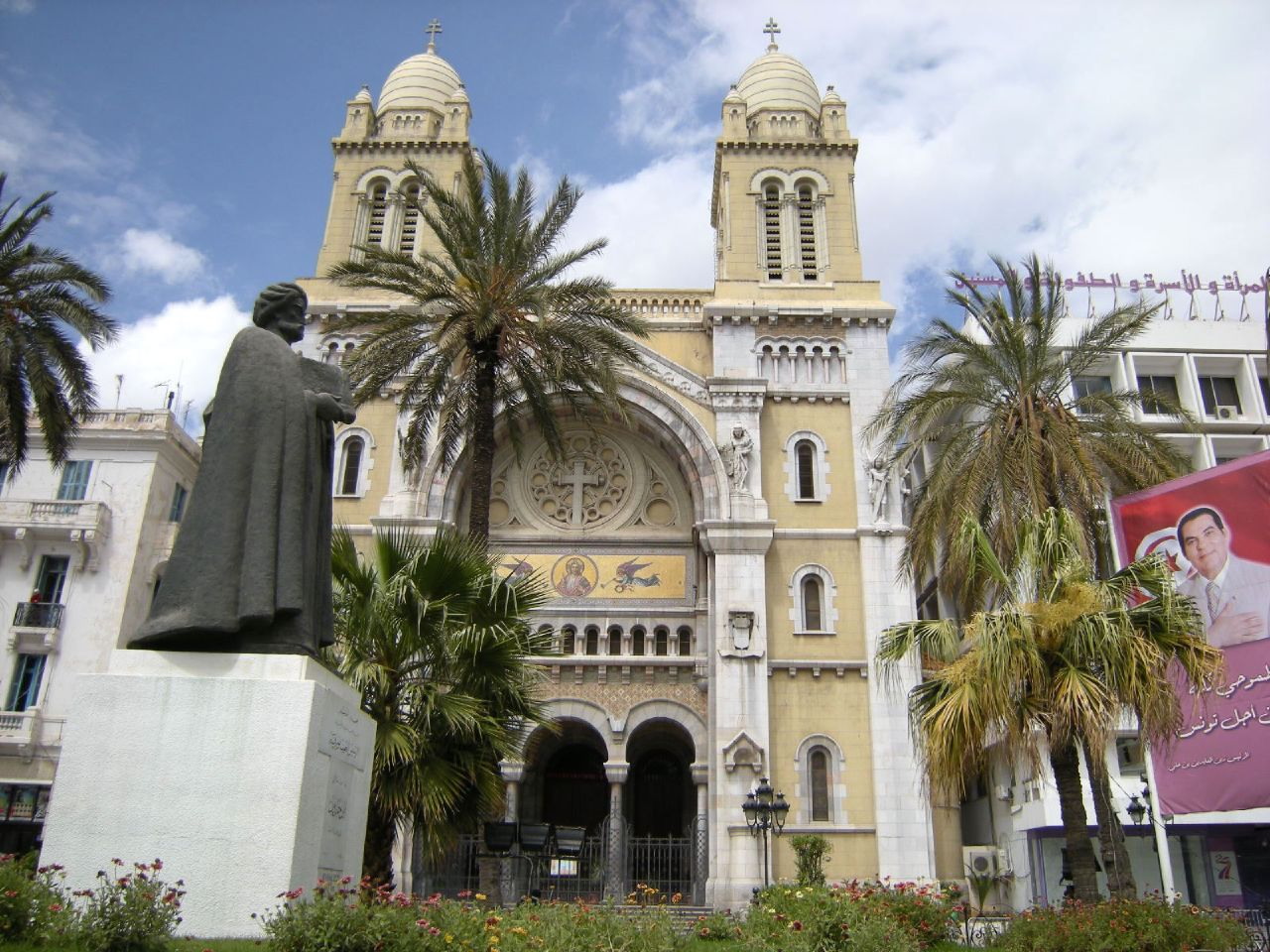
Cathedral of St. Vincent de Paul, Tunis

The Church of Carthage, in particular, became significant in the history of Christianity, playing a key role in the development of Christian philosophy and theology, and producing many prominent religious scholars and theologians. Prior to independence, Tunisia was home to more than 250,000 Christians (mostly of Italian and Maltese ancestry). Many Christian Italian settlers left to Italy or France after independence from France. Today, Tunisia's sizable Christian community of something over 35,000 is composed mainly of Catholics (22,000), and to a lesser degree Protestants. Berber Christians continued to live in some Nefzaoua villages up until the early fifteenth century, and the community of Tunisian Christians existed in the town of Tozeur up to the 18th century. The International Religious Freedom Report for 2007 estimates that thousands of Tunisian Muslims have converted to Christianity.

Judaism is the third largest religion, with between 1,000 and 1,400 members. One third of the Jewish population lives in and around the capital. The remainder lives on the island of Djerba with 39 synagogues where the Jewish community dates back 2,600 years, in Sfax, and in Hammam-Lif. Djerba, an island in the Gulf of Gabès, is home to El Ghriba synagogue, which is one of the oldest synagogues in the world and the oldest continuously used. Many Jews consider it a pilgrimage site, with celebrations taking place there once a year due to its age and the legend that the synagogue was built using stones from Solomon's Temple. Although antisemitic violence has been reported, Tunisia and Morocco are said to be the Arab countries most accepting of their Jewish populations.

There is also a Baháʼí Faith community.

=== Education ===
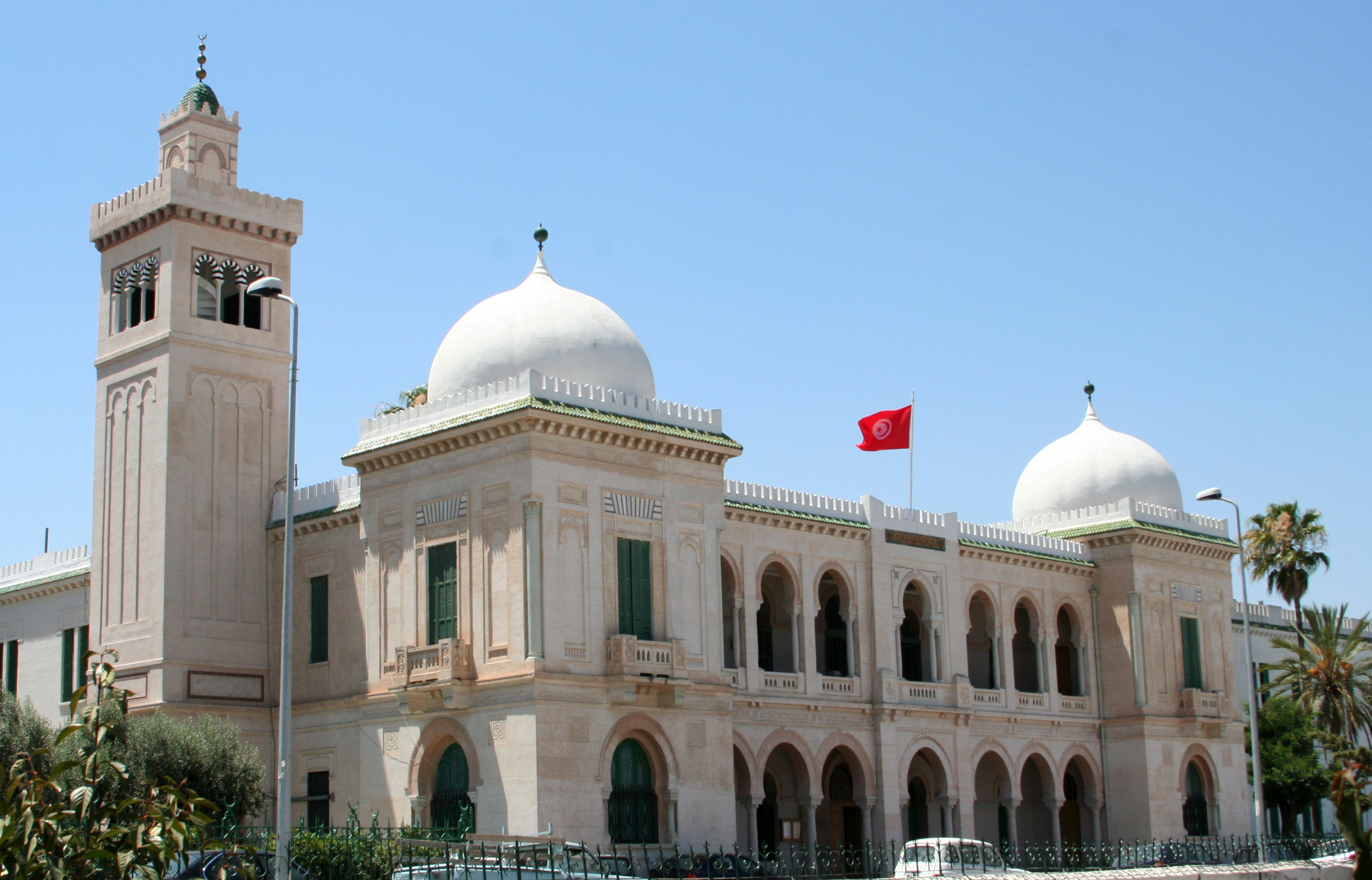
Sadiki College in Tunis

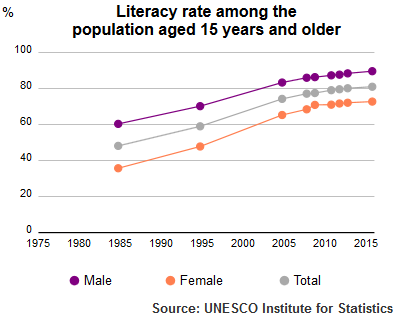
Literacy rate of Tunisia population, 15 years and older, 1985–2015. UNESCO Institute of Statistics

The total adult literacy rate in 2008 was 78% and this rate goes up to 97.3% when considering only people from 15 to 24 years old. Education is given a high priority and accounts for 6% of GNP. A basic education for children between the ages of 6 and 16 has been compulsory since 1991. Tunisia ranked 17th in the category of "quality of the [higher] educational system" and 21st in the category of "quality of primary education" in The Global Competitiveness Report 2008–09, released by the World Economic Forum.

While children generally acquire Tunisian Arabic at home, when they enter school at age six, they are taught to read and write in Standard Arabic. From the age of 8, they are taught French while English is introduced at the age of 11.

The four years of secondary education are open to all holders of Diplôme de Fin d'Études de l'Enseignement de Base where the students focus on entering university level or join the workforce after completion. The Enseignement secondaire is divided into two stages: general academic and specialized. The higher education system in Tunisia has experienced a rapid expansion and the number of students has more than tripled over the past 10 years from approximately 102,000 in 1995 to 365,000 in 2005. The gross enrollment rate at the tertiary level in 2007 was 31 percent, with gender parity index of GER of 1.5.

== Culture ==
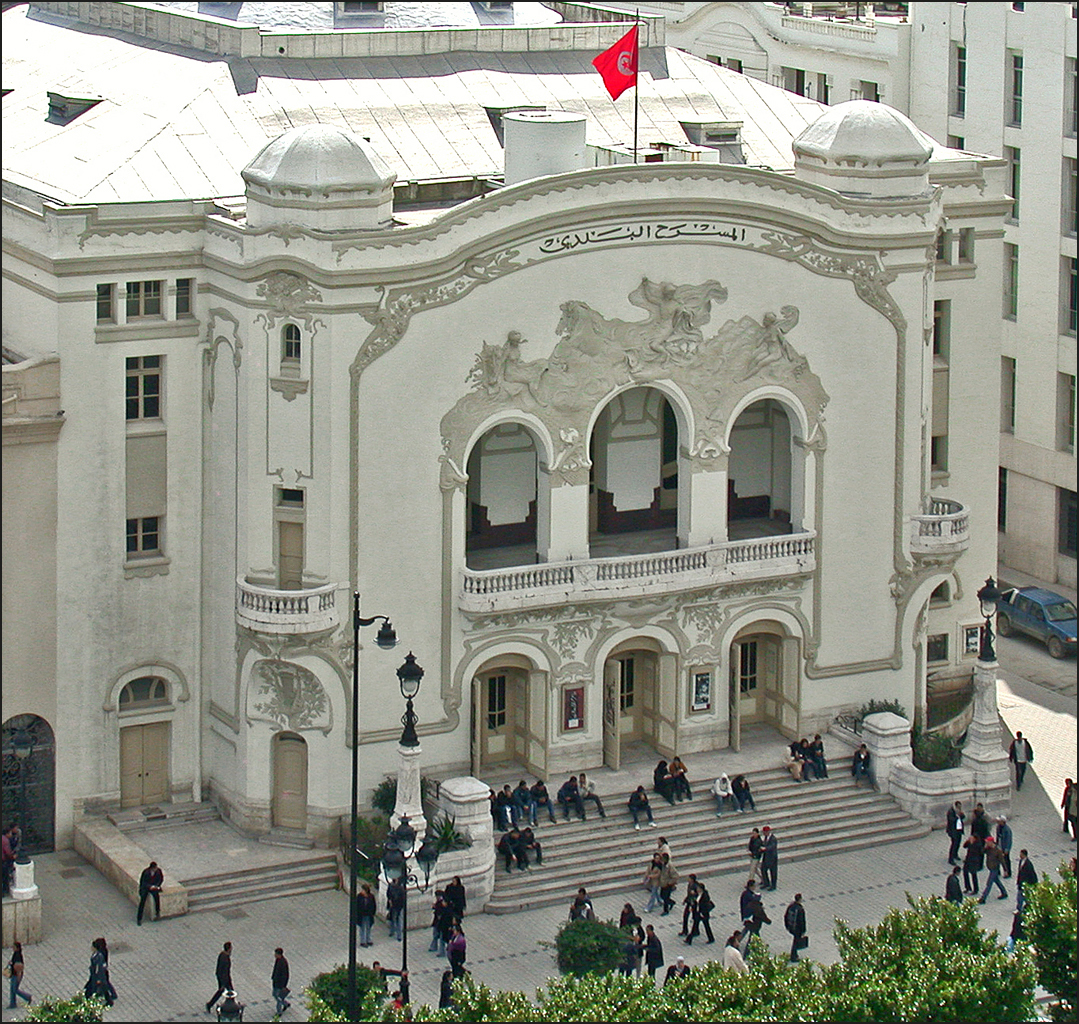
Municipal Theatre

The culture of Tunisia is mixed due to its long established history of outside influence from people – such as Phoenicians, Romans, Vandals, Byzantines, Arabs, Siculo-Normans, Turks, Italians, Maltese and the French – who all left their mark on the country.

=== Painting ===
The birth of Tunisian contemporary painting is strongly linked to the School of Tunis, established by a group of artists from Tunisia united by the desire to incorporate native themes and rejecting the influence of Orientalist colonial painting. It was founded in 1949 and brings together French and Tunisian Muslims, Christians and Jews. Pierre Boucherle was its main instigator, along with Yahia Turki, Abdelaziz Gorgi, Moses Levy, Ammar Farhat, and Jules Lellouche. Given its doctrine, some members have therefore turned to the sources of aesthetic Arab-Muslim art, such as miniature Islamic architecture, etc. Expressionist paintings by Amara Debbache, Jellal Ben Abdallah, and Ali Ben Salem are recognized while abstract art captures the imagination of painters like Edgar Naccache, Nello Levy, and Hedi Turki.

After independence in 1956, the art movement in Tunisia was propelled by the dynamics of nation building and by artists serving the state. A Ministry of Culture was established, under the leadership of ministers such as Habib Boularès who oversaw art and education and power. Artists gained international recognition such as Hatem El Mekki or Zoubeir Turki and influenced a generation of new young painters. Sadok Gmech draws his inspiration from national wealth while Moncef Ben Amor turns to fantasy. In another development, Youssef Rekik reused the technique of painting on glass and founded Nja Mahdaoui calligraphy with its mystical dimension.

There are currently fifty art galleries housing exhibitions of Tunisian and international artists. These galleries include Gallery Yahia in Tunis and Carthage Essaadi gallery.

A new exposition opened in an old monarchal palace in Bardo dubbed the "awakening of a nation". The exposition boasts documents and artifacts from the Tunisian reformist monarchial rule in mid-19th century.

=== Literature ===
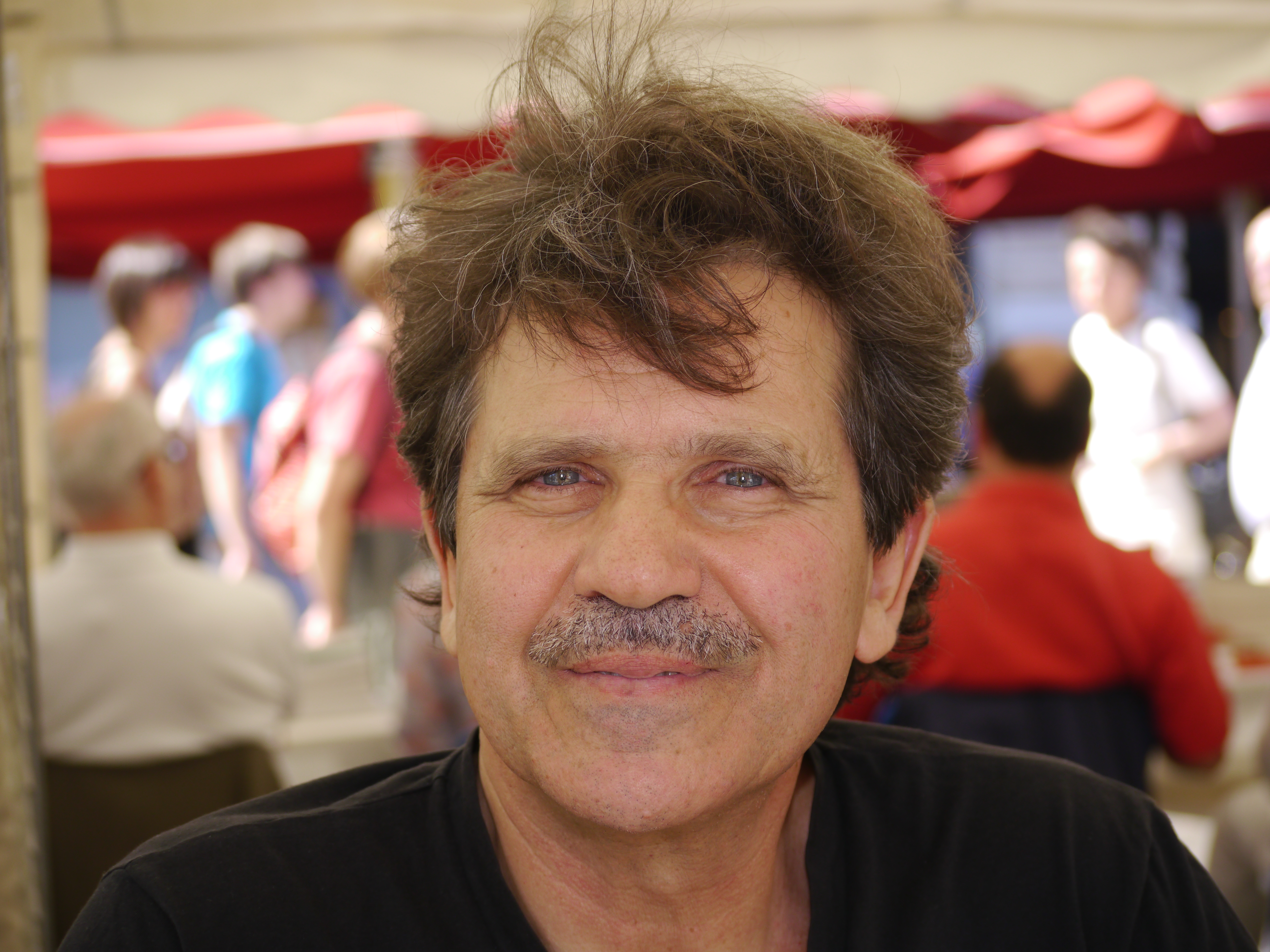
Abdelwahab Meddeb, a Tunisian French-language poet and novelist

Tunisian literature exists in two forms: Arabic and French. Arabic literature dates back to the 7th century with the arrival of Arab civilization in the region. It is more important in both volume and value than French literature, which was introduced during the French protectorate from 1881.

Among the literary figures include Ali Douagi, who has produced more than 150 radio stories, over 500 poems and folk songs and nearly 15 plays, Khraief Bashir, an Arabic novelist who published many notable books in the 1930s and which caused a scandal because the dialogues were written in Tunisian dialect, and others such as Moncef Ghachem, Mohamed Salah Ben Mrad, or Mahmoud Messadi.

As for poetry, Tunisian poetry typically opts for nonconformity and innovation with poets such as Aboul-Qacem Echebbi.

As for literature in French, it is characterized by its critical approach. Contrary to the pessimism of Albert Memmi, who predicted that Tunisian literature was sentenced to die young, a high number of Tunisian writers are abroad including Abdelwahab Meddeb, Bakri Tahar, Mustapha Tlili, Hele Beji, or Mellah Fawzi. Themes of wandering, exile, heartbreak, disconnection, memory, and representation are often focuses of Tunisian literature.

The national bibliography lists 1249 non-school books published in 2002 in Tunisia, with 885 titles in Arabic. In 2006 this figure had increased to 1,500 and 1,700 in 2007. Nearly a third of the books are published for children.

=== Music ===
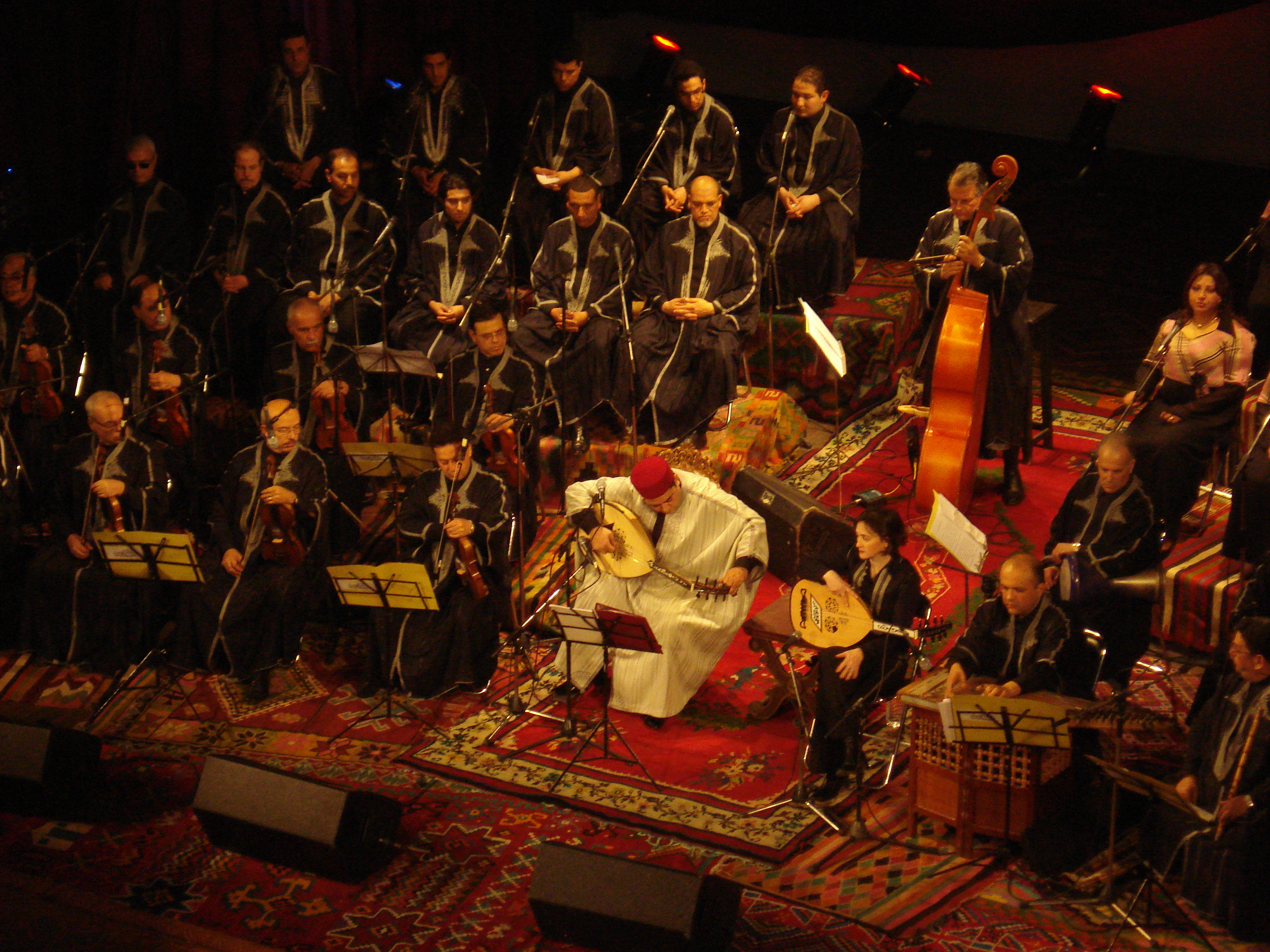
Rachidia orchestra playing traditional music in Tunis Theater

At the beginning of the 20th century, musical activity was dominated by the liturgical repertoire associated with different religious brotherhoods and secular repertoire which consisted of instrumental pieces and songs in different Andalusian forms and styles of origins, essentially borrowing characteristics of musical language. In 1930 The Rachidia was founded, well known thanks to artists from the Jewish community. The founding in 1934 of a musical school helped revive Arab Andalusian music largely to a social and cultural revival led by the elite of the time who became aware of the risks of loss of the musical heritage and which they believed threatened the foundations of Tunisian national identity. The institution did not take long to assemble a group of musicians, poets, scholars. The creation of Radio Tunis in 1938 allowed musicians a greater opportunity to disseminate their works, with the station employing a policy of promoting Tunisian musicians exclusively.

Notable Tunisian musicians include Saber Rebaï, Dhafer Youssef, Belgacem Bouguenna, Sonia M'barek, Latifa, Salah El Mahdi, Anouar Brahem, Emel Mathlouthi and Lotfi Bouchnak.

=== Festivals ===
Hundreds of international festivals, national, regional or local punctuate the calendar year. Music and theatrical festivals dominate the national cultural scene.

Several festivals take place annually in summer: the International Festival of Carthage in July, the International Festival of Arts of Mahr from late July to early August, and the International Festival of Hammamet in July and August.

The Carthage Film Festival is held in October and November of every other year, alternating with the Carthage Theatre Festival. It was created in 1966 by the Tunisian Minister of Culture to showcase films from the Maghreb, Africa and the Middle East. In order to be eligible for the competition, a film must have a director of African or Middle Eastern nationality, and have been produced at least two years before entry. The grand prize is the Tanit d'or, or "Golden Tanit", named for the lunar goddess of ancient Carthage; the award is in the shape of her symbol, a trapezium surmounted by a horizontal line and a circle.

The International Festival of the Sahara, celebrated annually at the end of December, honors the cultural traditions associated with the Tunisian desert. This attracts many tourists and musicians from all around the world, as well as horsemen who flaunt their saddles and local fabrics and skills.

There are also a number of musical festivals; some honor traditional Tunisian music, while others, including the Tabarka Jazz Festival, focus on other genres.

In the city of Sousse, the Carnival of Awussu is an annual festive and cultural event that unfolds each 24 July. It is a parade of symbolic chariots, fanfares and folk groups from Tunisia and elsewhere which takes place near the beach of Boujaafar, at the eve of the beginning of 'Awussu (the word designating the heat wave of the month of August according to the Berber calendar). Originally it was a Pagan feast (Neptunalia) celebrating the god of the seas, Neptune in the Roman province of Africa, and might even go back to Phoenician times: the appellation Awussu is a possible deformation of Oceanus.

Omek Tannou is an ancient Tunisian rainmaking festival which was inherited from Punic and Berber traditions involving invocations of the goddess Tanit. It features the ritual use of the sculpted head of a woman (somewhat resembling the head of a girl's doll), which is carried in procession between the houses of a village during periods of drought by children singing the refrain أمك طانقو يا نساء طلبت ربي عالشتاء (transliteration: amk ṭangu ya nsaʾ tlbt rbi ʿalshta'a), "Amek tango, o women, ask God to rain". This song varies according to the region because the term shta designates rain only in certain urban areas. Each housewife then pours a little water on the statuette, invoking rain.

=== Media ===
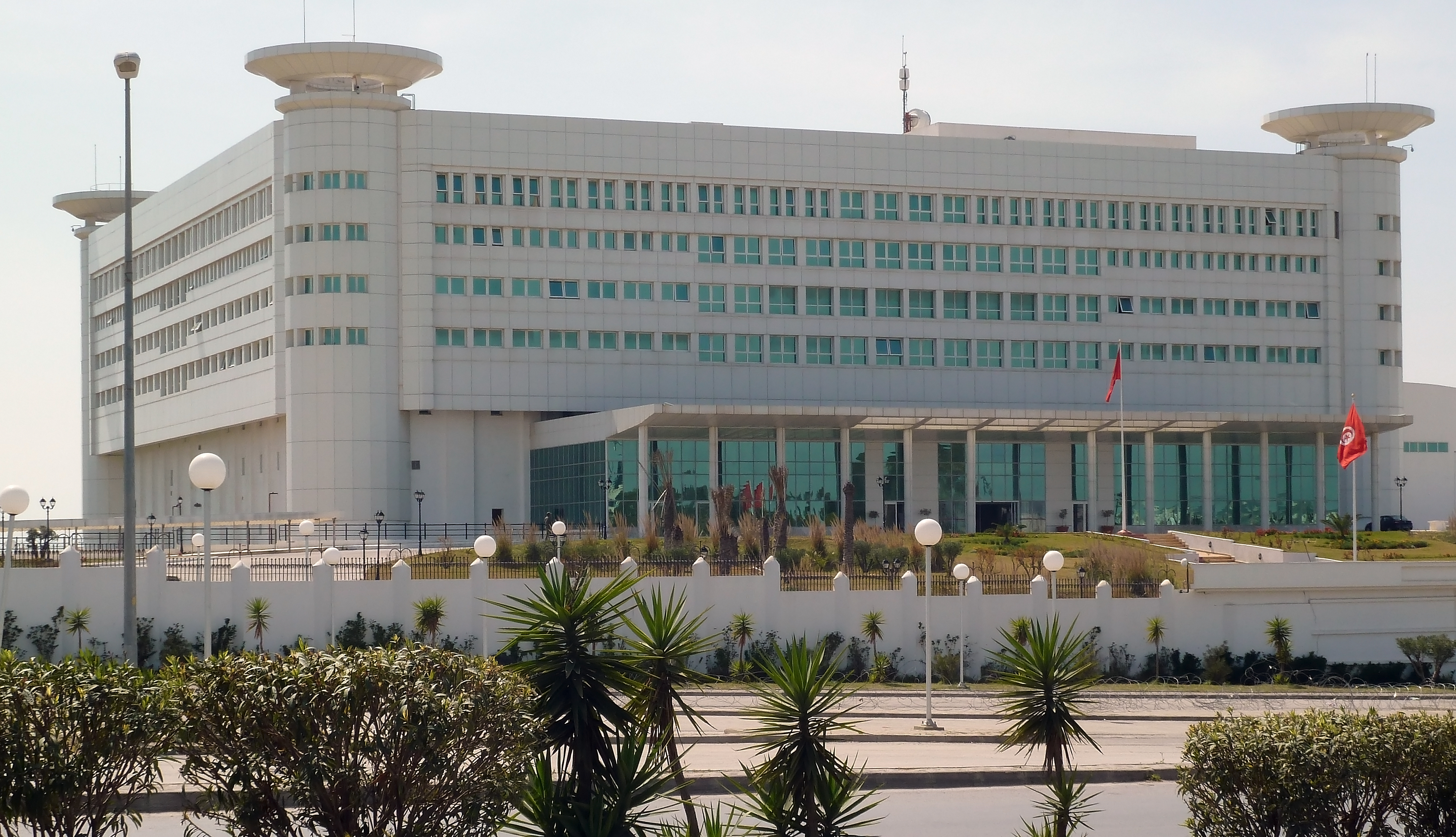
Headquarters of Télévision Tunisienne since March 2010

The TV media has long remained under the domination of the Establishment of the Broadcasting Authority Tunisia (ERTT) and its predecessor, the Tunisian Radio and Television, founded in 1957. On 7 November 2006, President Zine el-Abidine Ben Ali announced the demerger of the business into two separate companies, which became effective on 31 August 2007. Until then, ERTT managed all public television stations (Télévision Tunisienne 1 as well as Télévision Tunisienne 2 which had replaced the defunct RTT 2) and four national radio stations (Radio Tunis, Tunisia Radio Culture, Youth and RTCI) and five regional stations in Sfax, Monastir, Gafsa, Le Kef and Tataouine. Most programs are in Arabic, but some are in French. Growth in private sector radio and television broadcasting has seen the creation of numerous operations including Radio Mosaique FM, Jawhara FM, Zaytuna FM, Hannibal TV, Ettounsiya TV, and Nessma TV.

In 2007, some 245 newspapers and magazines (compared to only 91 in 1987) are 90% owned by private groups and independents. The Tunisian political parties have the right to publish their own newspapers, but those of the opposition parties have very limited editions (like Al Mawkif or Mouwatinoun). Before the recent democratic transition, although freedom of the press was formally guaranteed by the constitution, almost all newspapers have in practice followed the government line report. Critical approach to the activities of the president, government and the Constitutional Democratic Rally Party (then in power) were suppressed. In essence, the media was dominated by state authorities through the Agence Tunis Afrique Presse. This has changed since, as the media censorship by the authorities have been largely abolished, and self-censorship has significantly decreased. Nonetheless, the current regulatory framework and social and political culture mean that the future of press and media freedom is still unclear. In September 2022 Tunisian president Kais Saied signed Decree Law 54, which purported to combat "false information and rumours" on the Internet. Article 24 of the decree gives up to five years imprisonment and a fine of up to 50,000 dinar for anyone found to be spreading such information. This is doubled if the offending statement is made about a state official.

=== Sports ===
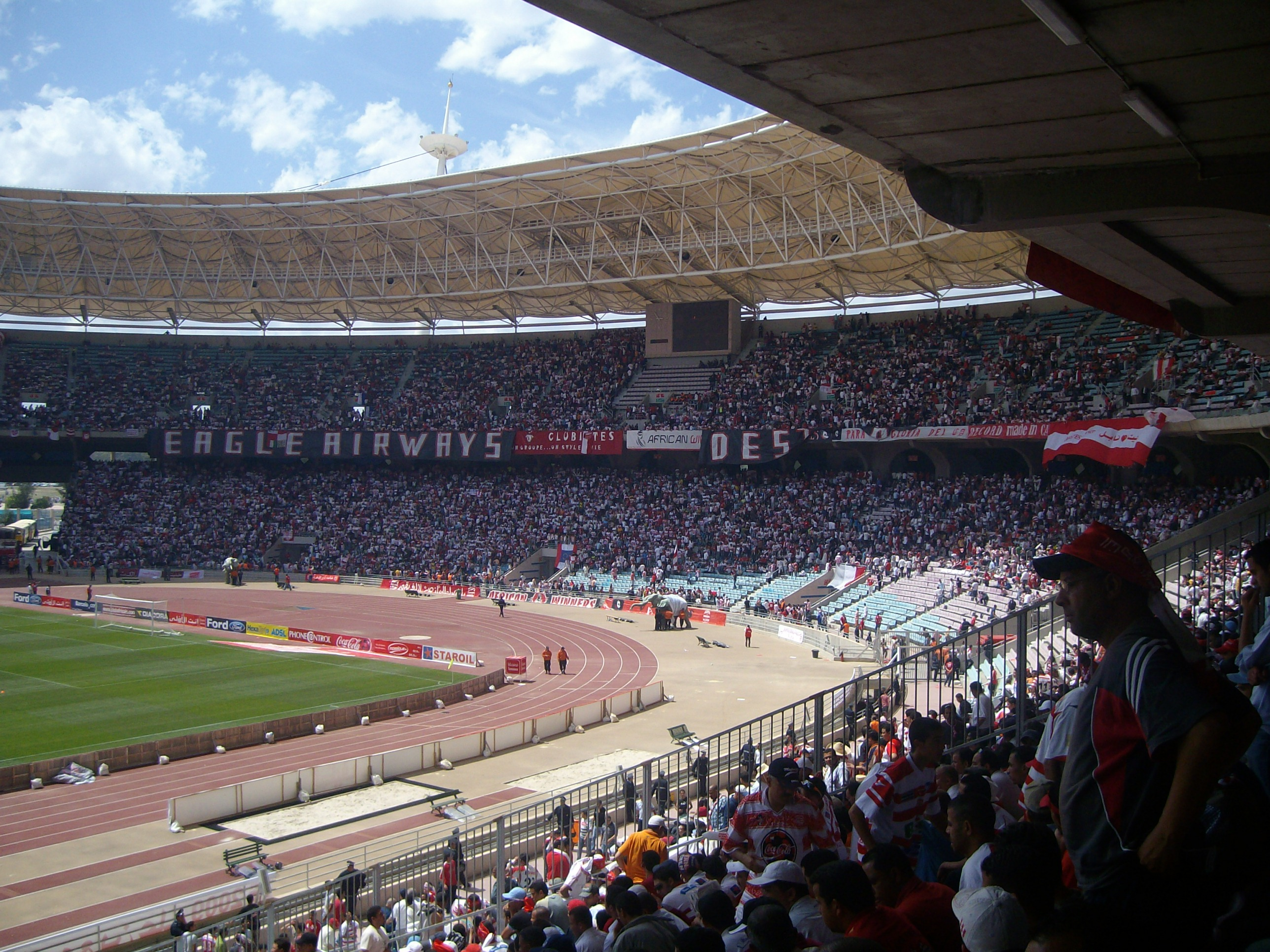
Stade Hammadi Agrebi in Radès

Football is the most popular sport in Tunisia. The Tunisia national football team, also known as "The Eagles of Carthage", won the 2004 African Cup of Nations (ACN) as hosts. They also represented Africa in the 2005 FIFA Cup of Confederations, which was held in Germany, but they could not go beyond the first round.

Their premier football league is the Tunisian Ligue Professionnelle 1. The main clubs are Espérance Sportive de Tunis, Étoile Sportive du Sahel, Club Africain, Club Sportif Sfaxien, Union Sportive Monastirienne, Stade Tunisien, and CA Bizertin.

The Tunisia men's national handball team has participated in several handball world championships. In 2005, Tunisia came fourth. The national league consists of about 12 teams, with Club Africain and Espérance dominating. The most famous Tunisian handball player is Wissem Hmam. In the 2005 Handball Championship in Tunis, Wissem Hmam was ranked as the top scorer of the tournament. The Tunisian national handball team won the African Cup ten times, being the team dominating this competition. The Tunisians won the 2018 African Cup in Gabon by defeating Egypt.

Tunisia's national basketball team has emerged as a top side in Africa. The team won the 2011 Afrobasket and hosted Africa's top basketball event in 1965, 1987 and 2015. Tunisia was one of the continent's pioneers in basketball as it established one of Africa's first competitive leagues.

In boxing, Victor "Young" Perez was world champion in the flyweight weight class in 1931 and 1932.

In the 2008 Summer Olympics, Tunisian Oussama Mellouli won a gold medal in 1500 meter freestyle. In the 2012 Summer Olympics, he won a bronze medal in the 1500 meter freestyle and a gold medal in the men's marathon swim at a distance of 10 kilometers.

In 2012, Tunisia participated for the seventh time in its history in the Summer Paralympic Games. Their national team finished the competition with 19 medals; 9 golds, 5 silvers and 5 bronzes. Tunisia was classified 14th on the Paralympics medal table and 5th in Athletics.

Throughout the years 2021 to 2023, tennis saw a spike of popularity in Tunisia and other Arabic countries as tennis player Ons Jabeur rapidly moved up the rankings reaching a career high ranking of number 3, and making 3 grand slam finals, including 2 at Wimbledon.

== See also ==
- Outline of Tunisia
- Architecture of Tunisia
