= Freedom, Order, Justice =

"Freedom, Order, Justice" (Arabic: حرية، نظام، عدالة) as inscribed on the coat of arms.

"Freedom, Order, Justice" (Arabic: حرية، نظام، عدالة, romanized: Ḥoṛiya, Niẓām, 'Adāla) is the national motto of Tunisia. It was adopted with the new coat of arms of independent Tunisia by the Beylical decree of 21 June 1956. After the abolition of the monarchy on 25 July 1957, the Tunisian republic continued to use the motto.

It is enshrined in Article 4 of the 1959 Constitution of 1 June 1959. The law of 30 May 1963, modifying the coat of arms, also changed the order of the national motto to Order, Freedom, Justice (نظام، حرية، عدالة). This order was reverted on 2 September 1989.

The motto was changed to Freedom, Dignity, Justice, Order by Article 4 of the 2014 Constitution of 10 February 2014. The motto was again changed to Freedom, Order, Justice by Article 9 of the 2022 Constitution of 25 July 2022.
