= Coat of arms of Tunisia =

Coat of arms
- Armiger: Republic of Tunisia
- Crest: "A white circle with a figure of a red star with five points encircled by symbol."
- Shield: A shield or divided in point consisting of: , a lion sable turned to the left and armed with a scimitar argent; dexter, scales sable; in chief, a ship with a hull bistre, sails argent and flags gules sailing on a sea azure.
- Motto: نظام - حرية - عدالة ('Freedom, Order, Justice')

The coat of arms of Tunisia is divided into three parts. The upper part features a Carthaginian galley sailing on the sea—the symbol of freedom. The lower part is itself divided vertically: on the left there is a black scale—the symbol of justice, and on the right is a black lion grasping a silver scimitar—the symbol of order. Between the two parts is a banner bearing the national motto: "Freedom, Order, Justice (حرية، نظام، عدالة). At the top of the coat of arms is a circle with a red border into which is inserted the red crescent and star appearing.

Until the law of 1963, the background was azure (upper part), gold (lower dexter part) and gules (lower sinistral part). Subsequently, the gold color uniformly replaces them. Only the motto inscribed on the coat of arms appears in the 1959 Constitution.

== Monarchy ==
=== Beylical coat of arms of 1861 ===
The first coat of arms of independent Tunisia are the beylical coat of arms in use from 1861 to 21 June 1956, date of adoption by beylical decree of the coat of arms of the kingdom of Tunisia independent since 20 March of the same year. Although they were officially adopted in 1861, they were already in use well before that date. They appear in particular on the cover of the book written by Henry Dunant and published in 1858.

Beylik of Tunis 19th century

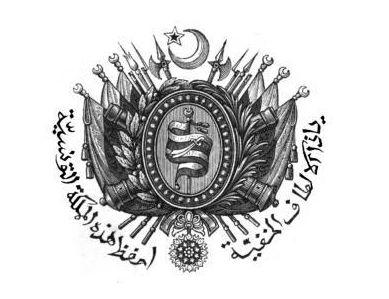
Husseinic coat of arms in 1858

Husseinic coat of arms in 1900

=== Royal coat of arms of 1956 ===
Coat of arms of Tunisia (1956-1963).

The Beylical coat of arms is replaced by the new coat of arms of the Kingdom of Tunisia adopted by the Beylical decree of 21 June 1956. These are emblazoned as follows:

- On the dexter side of a lion passant Sable turned to the dexter armed with a sword Argent on a ground Gules;
- Sinister of a scale of sand on a gold background;
- As head of a Carthaginian galley scathing on waves and an azure background;
- Top of the starry crescent of Tunisia;
- Posed in chief on trophy of two lances and crossed banners;
- Supported at the tip by a mid-section wall crown of sheaves of ears of corn on the dexter and olive branches on the sinister;
- Tied with the National Merit plaque;
- Motto on banner: Freedom, Order, Justice.

These coats of arms include certain relics of the Beylical coat of arms. On 13 September of the same year, the plaque of the Order of Independence replaced that of National Merit

== Republic ==
Coat of arms of Tunisia (1963–1989)

Current coat of arms of Tunisia.

=== Coat of arms of 1957 ===
After the abolition of the monarchy on 25 July 1957, the royal coat of arms remained that of the republican regime.

=== Coat of arms of 1963 ===
The law of 30 May 1963 significantly modifies the coat of arms by removing the elements of the beylical coat of arms (spears and banners), by reversing the locations of the scales and the lion, by modifying the color of the background (gold) and by changing the order of the national motto:

- Right hand of a black scale;
- Sinister of a black lion turned sinister armed with a silver scimitar;
- Motto on gold banner with black inscription: Freedom, Order, Justice;
- In charge of a ship with a bistre hull, silver sails and flying red flags sailing on the azure sea;
- Crowned with the national emblem with a white circle containing a five-pointed red star surrounded by a red crescent.

=== Coat of arms of 1989 ===
The law of 2 September 1989 reverses the order of the national currency, returning to that of 1956:

- On the right, a lion facing left and armed with a silver scimitar;
- On the left, a black scale;
- The motto of the Republic is inscribed in black on a gold banner: Freedom, Order, Justice;
- In chief, a ship with a bistre hull, silver sails and flying red flags lashing on the azure sea;
- Crowned with the national emblem with a white circle containing a five-pointed red star surrounded by a red crescent.

=== Project of new coat of arms ===
Following the adoption of the Constitution on 10 February 2014, its article 4 modifies the country's currency. Consequently, a competition is launched by the Ministry of Culture, for graphic design agencies, to redesign the coat of arms, with a prize of 15,000 dinars for the selected project; a law must ratify the choice.

In January 2015, the government of Béji Caïd Essebsi decided to keep the current coat of arms pending the adoption of a new project.

== See also ==
- Flag of Tunisia
- Freedom, Order, Justice
- Armorial of Africa
