= Baccouche =

Baccouche (Arabic: البكوش) is an Arabic surname, occurring especially in Tunisia. Notable people with the surname include:

- Aziza Baccouche (1976–2021), American physicist and science filmmaker of Tunisian descent
- Féthi Baccouche (born 1960), Tunisian long-distance runner
- Hachemi Baccouche (1916–2008), Tunisian writer, humanist, and psychosociologist
- Hédi Baccouche (1930–2020), Tunisian politician, prime minister of Tunisia (1987–1989)
- Lotfi Baccouche (1973–1999), Tunisian footballer
- Slaheddine Baccouche (1883–1959), Tunisian politician, two-time prime minister of Tunisia
- Taïeb Baccouche (born 1944), Tunisian politician, minister and Secretary-General of the Arab Maghreb Union
