= Makhzen (Tunisia) =

Politico-administrative body of the Beylik of Tunis

In Tunisia, makhzen was the term used to designate the political and administrative establishment of the Beylik of Tunis before the proclamation of the republic in 1957. The makhzen consisted of families of Turkish origin, or Turkish-speaking mamluks of European origin, intermarried with indigenous Tunisian families who were great merchants or landowners. This network of families dominated the high offices of state, the leadership of the army and the positions of rank and power in the regions outside the capital. They were also closely connected with the senior ulema. These were known as “makhzen families”. Outside of the capital and the major towns, the term 'makhzen' designated not the leading families close to the regime, but those of the interior tribes which had a trusted relationship with the ruling family. Together the great families and the loyal tribes made up the country's 'establishment'.

== Origin of the term ==
Originally the term 'makhzen' denoted specifically the escort attached to the ruler or to his deputy while they were outside the capital, particularly on "mahalla" tours gathering taxes. On these tours substantial sums of money were collected and stored (Arabic: مخزن (makhzen) means "storehouse"). Under Hussein Bey the term also came to include tribes who provided contingents of men to escort the mahalla column who received privileges in return.

The composition of this escort evolved over time depending on changes in administration and military organisation, even after the term “makhzen” had taken on a much wider meaning than this original use. In 1864 the makhzen corps accompanying the mahalla of General Zarrouk consisted of a household force responsible for lighting the lamps in the camp and guarding prisoners and horses as well as the treasure itself, while the Zouaouas and the tribal contingents were assigned to other units.

== Makhzen families ==
Among the families of the Tunisian makhzen were:

- Agha
- Al-Ghammad
- Bach Hamba
- Bach Mamelouk
- Bayram, frequently occupied the post of Hanafi mufti
- Bel-Hadj
- Ben Ammar
- Ben Ayed, originally from Djerba
- Bliloua
- Caïd Essebsi, from whom came President Beji Caid Essebsi
- Djellouli, a family from Sfax that provided Tunisia with 20 governors, 4 ministers and 2 prime ministers
- Ghazali
- Kahia
- Khodja
- Lasram, originally from Yemen, settled in Kairouan
- Marwan
- Mrabet
- Nouira from whom came the prime minister Hedi Nouira.
- Rassaa
- Sahab Tabaa
- Siala, originally merchants from Sfax
- Zarrouk

These makhzen families represented a stabilisation of central power in the sixteenth and seventeenth centuries relative to the political systems of previous eras; they replaced the old tribal elites whose support had previously been essential to maintaining power. During the Ottoman period the Tunisian state proceeded to consolidate itself without seeking any significant foundation either in ideological legitimation or in representing the interests of the community of the governed. This new state formation freed itself from the need for tribal support by maintaining a central army and governing through a makhzen establishment. The Tunisian state came to rely upon Mediterranean trade to supplement its inadequate internal resources. Although this benefited the existing makhzens and allowed them to remain in power without any need for active local support, Mediterranean trade encouraged trade monopolies, permitting European powers and their merchants to become directly involved in the politics.

These families constituted an elite exercising economic oligarchy close to the central power of the Bey, reinforced by political and familial distinctions of rank. Most of the high functionaries of the 18th century Tunisian state owed their wealth to their official positions, rather than inheriting it. One notorious example was Qacim Ben Soultana, self-made man, who took advantage of his official position to amass a colossal fortune by devoting himself to foreign trade and arming privateers as well as by exploiting his urban and agricultural properties. Indeed, dominant positions in the export trade were often held by Turkish or Mamluk officials such as Slimane Belhadj, the second largest exporter of wheat, oil and poppy or Hammouda Lasram, Agha of Zouaoua and Head of Customs was the largest exporter of poppy. However these fortunes, no matter how large they grew, remained insecure and at the mercy of the Bey. Ben Soultana, for example, was ruined by an arbitrary decision of the Bey in July 1730.

== Decline of the makhzen families under the French protectorate ==
The state which the makhzen families served was unable to mount any effective military resistance to the French invasion in 1881, and the establishment of the French protectorate removed power and influence from court positions - indeed some high offices of state were completely abolished. French rule deprived the makhzen families of their positions and led to a much higher rate of marriage with daughters of wealthy merchants in Tunis. This saw the emergence of families referred to as “beldi”. Typically they lived in fine houses in the medina of Tunis.

The rise of the nationalist movement in Tunisia in the 20th century posed new challenges to the makhzen families. They were widely regarded as 'compromised' by their proximity to the colonial regime and their lack, in general, of any involvement in resistance against it. An important crisis point was in 1952, when Lamine Bey refused to accept as Prime Minister Slaheddine Baccouche, from a makhzen family, whom the French Resident fr:Jean de Hauteclocque was trying to force on him. Instead, he convened forty representatives of the Tunisian people and listened to their case for reform. Eventually however the Bey gave way to the wishes of the French, and this marked the end of any support for him from the nationalist movement led by the Neo-Destour party.

When France granted Tunisia internal autonomy in 1954, a government was formed under Tahar Ben Ammar (from a makhzen family) and it included several French representatives as well as four Destourians and members of makhzen families such as Aziz Djellouli and fr:Naceur Ben Saïd. After the return of Habib Bourguiba to Tunisia in 1955 the balance of power began to shift decisively against the Makhzen families. In September four ministers were dismissed - fr:Mustapha Kaak, Slaheddine Baccouche, Abdelkader Belkhodja and Hédi Raïs. In November the Neo-Destour Interior Mongi Slim dismissed the caïds of Souassi, Tozeur, Neffat, Aradh and the kahias of Nabeul, Thala and Ksour Essef. These changes were early indications of the more drastic changes that were to come after Tunisia gained complete independence in 1956.

== Makhzen families after independence ==
A law of June 21, 1956 reorganized regional administration in Tunisia and abolished in a single move many of the lower-level positions that had traditionally been filled by the makhzen families, and removed their serving postholders. The posts abolished included those of Sheikh el-Medina (Mayor of Tunis) and 37 regional caïds, 49 kahias and 77 khalifas. In each case the positions abolished were replaced with new posts, filled by Neo-Destour loyalists.

In 1957 Tunisia became a republic; the Lamine Bey was imprisoned and his family was dispossessed of their properties. A new law of August 17, 1957 provided for the confiscation of “ill-gotten goods” and this was soon deployed against the makhzen families. The property of sixteen notables was confiscated, including former ministers such as Mohamed Salah Mzali as well as former caïds and members of the Grand Council. A law of November 19, 1957 established a new procedure for dealing with individuals guilty of "l'indignité nationale" ("national unworthiness"). It applied to all those who before the date of Tunisian independence, members of the Grand Council, ministers, security officials, members of information and press services, or those who participated in the organization of artistic and economic events, policies and other activities that favoured colonization ... or of having published articles, brochures or books or lectured in favour of colonization. This measure inaugurated a full-scale nationalist “cleansing” of all those employed by the old regime.

The particular targets of these laws and campaigns were the ministers who had served in the cabinets of Salaheddine Baccouche (1952–1954) and Mohamed Salah Mzali (1954) because the new republican government believed that they had actively thwarted the national independence movement. Arraigned before the High Court, these ministers were sentenced to prison, designated nationally unworthy and has their property confiscated. Mohamed Salah Mzali was sentenced to ten years in prison, confiscation of his property and national unworthiness for life. His ministers were sentenced to three years in prison and national unworthiness. The members of the two former cabinets, gathered in the same room at the central prison, joined the son of the deposed bey, the former director of Sadiki College and a few professors from the University of Ez-Zitouna.

== Bled makhzen ==
Before the French Protectorate, the term “bled makhzen” (“lands of the makhzen”) meant those parts of the country which were effectively under the direct control of the Bey. This included the capital, the coastal cities and the main towns of the interior. The remainder of the country was known as “bled es-siba” (“lands of anarchy”). The distinction between the two varied over time as the central government exercised its authority in different ways, and individual villages and tribes had differing relationships with it. Other terms used were “bled et-Trouk” (land of the Turks) and “bled el-Arab” (“lands of the Arabs”).

== Makhzen tribes ==
The “makhzen tribes” were those loyal groups that originally provided troops to accompany the mahalla and supported the government in other ways, receiving privileges in return.

The Arab tribes of Tunisia were linked to each other through pledges of mutual assistance known as 'soffs'. By the nineteenth century there were two soffs, the Soff Hassina (Cheddad) organised around a traditional claim to have supported Hussein Bey during the rebellion of his nephew Ali Pasha, and the Soff Bachia who had supported Ali (though in fact this division may well have been much older). The Hussainid beys thereafter supported the Soff Hassina against its rivals and raised militia forces from them to maintain order in the southern regions. This provided the government in Tunis with a cheap and flexible means of controlling expanses of territory it would not otherwise have been able to garrison. Prominent among the makhzen tribes were the Drid; the Hammama who often took part in government expeditions to Central Tunisia; the Ouerghamma, the Neffat and the Jlass.

The French invasion upset the relationships between the makhzen tribes and the centre. From June to October 1881 the tribes buried their differences and opposed the French, but after the fall of Sfax in July and Kairouan in October, French columns moved south to threaten their arable lands and pastures. From this time on, the Soff Hassina closely linked with the ruling dynasty retreated before the columns and maintained a hostile attitude towards the invaders. The Soff Bachia fairly quickly came to terms with the French and thereafter took part in raids on Soff Hassina tribes alongside French forces.

Once the French protectorate of Tunisia was established, the French authorities found it useful to try to manage the south, and in particular, the border with Ottoman Tripolitania by using tribal auxiliaries, and they entered into negotiations with various tribes in an attempt to build a new makhzen network. Initially the focus of this strategy was the Beni Zid but after this proved unsuccessful negotiations were eventually concluded with the Ouderna, Haouia, and the Touazine in October 1884. Each agreed to maintain an agreed number of armed horsemen in return for tax exemptions. Their main duties were to deter and repel cross-border raids from Tripolitania. However following an attack by these forces on Turkish soldiers across the border, the French decided to completely restructure the makhzen auxiliary forces as a single professional body completely separated from any tribal loyalty, and this was effected by 1888. The tribes' tax privileges were maintained for a while, but their special relationship with the protectorate authorities was effectively at an end.

Under the French Protectorate, the decree of March 23, 1889 divided the southern territories of the Regency into Makhzen lands and lands where military recruitment would take place. The population of the Makhzen lands was exempted from recruiting and instead provided the protectorate government with permanent makhzen forces. Later, at the request of the French Resident's Military Authority, they could also be called on to provide a "non-permanent makhzen" or "non-permanent goum". The Ksourians of Matmata, sedentary and often still Berber-speaking, were attached to the non-Makhzen territory and were called up to serve in the Tunisian army. However, after fulfilling their military obligations, these men could also serve in the permanent Makhzen or engage in the goums. The non-permanent makhzen forces were first organised by a decree of September 23, 1914 and fell into disuse at the end of the First World War in 1919. All able-bodied men aged 20 to 40 from the Ouerghemma and Nefzaoua were included.

== See also ==
- Makhzen (Algeria)
- Makhzen (Morocco)
