= Tunisian Consultative Conference =

The Tunisian Consultative Conference was an organ of government set up under the French Protectorate of Tunisia. Presided over by the French Resident-General or his representative, its remit was originally very narrow: it was not allowed to discuss political or constitutional matters, or public finances and accounts. At the same time it was accountable for “obligatory” spending, which included the civil list of the Bey and subsidies paid to the ruling Husainid dynasty, as well as the servicing of Tunisia's public debt and the management costs of French services in the protectorate (decree of 2 February 1907). The steady evolution of this institution over time was a measure of the development of nationalist ideas. A generation of Tunisian politicians, including Abdeljelil Zaouche, Tahar Ben Ammar and Mohamed Chenik, made their entry into public life through the conference, and eventually negotiated the terms of Tunisian independence.

== Early period (1891-1907) ==
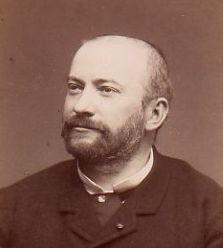
Justin Massicault, Resident General, who established the conference in 1891

From 1688, the French community in Tunis, mainly merchants, made representations to the French consul through two deputies. On 23 June 1885, after the establishment of the French protectorate, this arrangement was superseded by a chamber of commerce. The Resident General, Paul Cambon, wanted it to represent all the interests of French colonists in the context of the Protectorate, but the members of the chamber wanted Tunisia to be annexed outright by France, and would not confine themselves to the limited role he envisaged for them.

They were supported from France by député Honoré Pontois, a former magistrate in Tunis, who in June 1890 brought forward proposals in the National Assembly for legislation to create a representative body for colonists in Tunisia, with the explicit remit of defending France's interests there. Although this bill did not go forward, it prompted the Foreign Minister Alexandre Ribot to write to the Resident General Justin Massicault on 24 October 1890 suggesting that he gathered representatives of French colonists periodically to seek their views on agricultural, industrial and commercial matters of importance to them.

A consultative conference was therefore established, which met for the first time in a wing of the Resident General's building in January 1891. It was composed of representatives of chambers of commerce and agriculture, and the French deputy mayors of towns that had been incorporated as communes. On 22 February 1896, representatives of French people who were neither farmers nor businessmen were admitted, thus including workers, civil servants, and the liberal professions for the first time. The number of delegates rose to 37 (sixteen representing farmers and businessmen, two representing vine growers, four from the North, three from the South, and twelve for the municipalities). The delegates for the North and the South were elected by indirect suffrage - French colonists voted for twelve delegates in the north and seven in the south, who then voted among themselves to decide who should take seats in the conference.

This method allowed the Resident General to make sure that those taking seats were those of established position, or indeed, in the case of the deputy mayors, chosen personally by him. Even with this composition however, most sessions of the conference were taken up with two demands that never went away – the election of a full assembly based on full suffrage for the French, and the right to examine the budget.

On 2 January 1905, the first of these demands was met. The conference was to be elected by universal suffrage of male French colonists, now divided into eight constituencies (Northwest, Bizerte, Tunis, Northeast, Centre-East, Centre-West, Sfax and South) and three colleges - agricultural, commercial (now including industrialists) and a third for others (workers, civil servants and professionals). Each college selected fifteen delegates, constituting a conference of forty-five, elected for four years. The electorate was French males over the age of 21 with two years’ residence in Tunisia, excluding those who had specified court judgements against them. In 1914, there were 10,406 electors out of 44,000 French colonists in Tunisia. This constitution ensured that farmers were overrepresented in the conference, even as their numbers declined as a proportion of the French population. In 1920 for example, they accounted for a third of delegates when they accounted for just 15.3% of the electorate.

From 1898, sessions of the conference were held in a building bought by the Resident General at 20 Avenue de Paris. It originally had a ground floor and a first floor, but when the Tunisian section was added in 1907, a second floor was added to accommodate it. In 1910, when the French and Tunisian sections began to sit separately, the Tunisians sat on the first floor, and the French on the second.

== French and Tunisian sections (1907-1920) ==
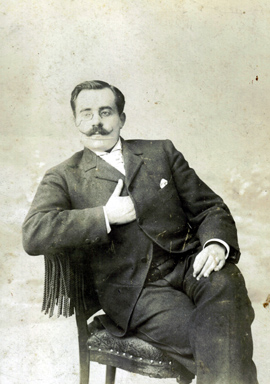
Abdeljelil Zaouche, one of the first Tunisians appointed to the conference

On 24 March 1906, Béchir Sfar first demanded that the Resident General make provision for the representation of native Tunisians. Faced with the wrath of the colonial landowners, he was made caid of Sousse to get him out of Tunis, but his claim could not be ignored. A decree of Naceur Bey on 2 February 1907 extended the remit of the conference in two important ways. First, it allowed examination of the state budget, and second, it established a Tunisian section for the first time. Sixteen Tunisians - fifteen Muslims and one Jew - were appointed for life by the government. Four were selected from Tunis (including the Jewish representative) and two from Sousse, with the rest drawn from the remainder of the country. Not every region of group was represented however; the Fraichiche, Majeur, Jlass, Ouled Ayar, and Ouled Aoun tribes were unrepresented, as were Téboursouk and Djerba.

This process of choosing Tunisian delegates was intended to ensure that they were accommodating towards the Protectorate government, and the conference quickly developed a reputation as being an institution for "béni oui-oui" (colonial yes-men). The intended effect was not however always achieved. In one early case, El Hadj Saïd Ben Abdelattif was appointed as a delegate, but a few years later, in 1915, died in the South of the country fighting the French army.

Among the first Tunisian delegates appointed was Abdeljelil Zaouche, and his selection prompted the first dissent in the ranks of the Young Tunisian movement. Ali Bach Hamba felt that participation in the conference should be based on elections, not appointment. Zaouche's view was that taking part in the conference was a way of making Tunisians' voices heard, and he used his position to speak out on many topics of importance to the nationalist movement. Zaouche remained a vociferous and leading member of the conference until 1917, when he was appointed caïd of Sousse, a post which required him to step down.

Some of the delegates chosen for their loyalty could not even speak French, which hindered discussions considerably. Zaouche noted in 1910 that each year these brave men arrived in Tunis fully briefed on the needs of their regions, but once the conference began its work, they felt completely out of place and, unable to follow the discussion, reached the end of the session without having been able to say a word.” For three years, the fifteen Tunisian and forty-five French delegates sat together. Their interests were often at odds, and hardly any were bilingual. Interpreters were introduced, but this led to translation problems. Above all, most of the French delegates remained irreconcilably opposed to the presence of Tunisians. Accordingly, the French delegates opposed every measure that would give any advantage to the Tunisians, including the proposed suppression of the mejba. Meetings grew more and more heated. Paul Lambert, one of the French delegates, commented that "One felt that these honourable colleagues - the French delegates - took a perverse delight in speaking badly of the Arabs, of making fun of them, at making the other French delegates laugh at the native delegates. Frankly, it made one feel ill to hear such sweeping and completely unjustified attacks. In one session, the arguments were so violent that two of the three French-speaking Muslim delegates walked out so as not to hear any more."

The Resident General Gabriel Alapetite eventually decided this arrangement could not work, so from 27 April 1910, the two sections sat separately. A Higher Council was set up, composed of ministers and heads of service, as well as three French and three Tunisian conference delegates, chosen by their peers. It was this Council's role to come to decisions in cases where the two sections of the conference were irreconcilably opposed.

In 1911, the term of service for French delegates was extended from four to six years. In 1912, a number of Tunisian delegates (Zaouche, Élie Fitoussi, Mohamed Ben Mabrouk and Brahim Ben Zouari) demanded that Tunisians be allowed in future to elect their representatives. This demand was renewed in 1920. That year, some of the French delegates began protesting against the fact that a third of the seats in their section of the conference were reserved for farmers, although they were a declining proportion of the French population. Four of them resigned in November over this issue and, at the last session in December, twenty more of their colleagues (out of 45) walked out of the session because they felt the real powers of the assembly were "non-existent." At the same time, the issue for the Tunisian delegates was the lack of any elections. At their last session in 1920, seven of the sixteen delegates, from Tunis, Sousse, Bizerte and Le Kef) made a statement decrying the fact that they had been appointed to their positions as long ago as 1907, calling for their terms of office to be ended, and for the replacements to be directly elected.

== Grand Council (1922-1951) ==
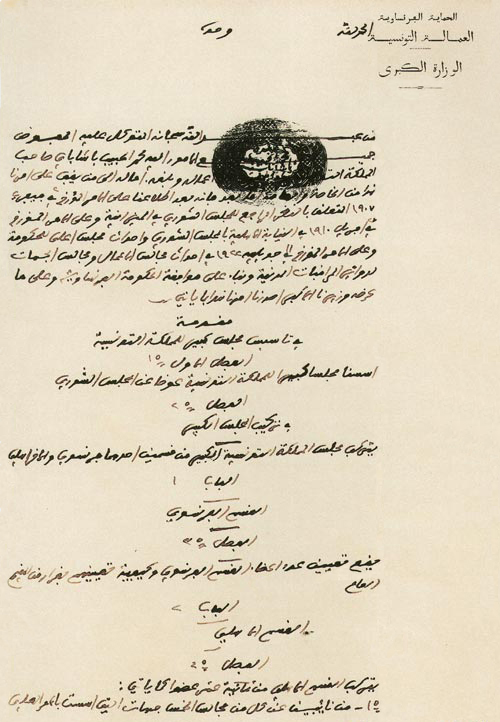
Decree establishing the Grand Council in 1922

The problems of 1920 in the conference was followed by a serious political crisis between Naceur Bey and the Resident General Lucien Saint in the spring of 1922. The Bey's death in July led to the accession of the more pliable Habib Bey and the setting up of a new representative structure, the Grand Council, that went some way to responding to the frustrations of the old consultative conference. Established on 13 July 1922, this consisted of:

- A French section with 44 members, including 21 representing major economic interests (industry, commerce and agriculture) and a further 23 elected by indirect suffrage of colonists, divided into five constituencies: Bizerte (5 delegates), Tunis (seven delegates), Le Kef (three delegates), Sousse (four delegates) and Sfax (four delegates).
- A Tunisian section with 18 members, including two elected from each of the same constituencies, plus two designated representatives for the South, four representing Tunisian chambers of agriculture and commerce, and two Jewish delegates. The first elections returned Mohamed Chenik, Tahar Ben Ammar, Aziz Djellouli, Mohamed Badra, Mohamed Tlatli, Sadok Tlatli and Victor Bessis.

As before the two sections conducted their business separately, with the French section presided over by the Resident General, and the Tunisian section by one of his nominees. An arbitration committee with seven members from each section and seven or eight high officials resolved any issues on which the two sections could not agree. The Grand Council had increased powers - it could now modify the budget instead of just scrutinising it, and the Resident General now had to secure the agreement of both sections before contracting any loans.

Elections for the French section were conducted by universal male suffrage using a list system which allowed for panachage. The electoral process for the Tunisian section was more complex, but represented a real step forward compared to the system of designated delegates created in 1907. Tunisian candidates for election had to be taxpaying men over the age of twenty-five, recognised as notable in their local area by virtue of their age, piety, education, social, or recognised service to the state. Those representing the chamber of agriculture and commerce were elected from lists approved by the government. Votes were not cast in secret - each Tunisian voter had to cast they vote by voice in front of two lawyers. Only the Jewish delegates were permitted to stand for election by direct suffrage on a secret ballot.

This form of election was universally denounced by the nationalist and communist press in Tunisia. Only rich landlords were represented in the Tunisian section, with workers and intellectuals excluded from the electorate. Tunisians accounted for just 29% of delegates (a small increase on the 26% under previous system) when they were the vast majority of the population.

From the late 1920s to the Second World War, a steady series of reforms expanded Tunisian representation in the Grand Council. In 1928 Tunisians who held a high school diploma were given the vote for the first time, and the number of delegates they elected indirectly rose from 18 to 26 (33% of the Council). At the same time, the number of French delegates went up from 44 to 52. In 1934, the number of Tunisians elected (rather than appointed) rose from 10 to 19, and there were henceforth 41 Tunisian delegates (42%) including four Jews, and 56 French. This was the last reform before the War – on 21 November 1940 the Grand Council was suspended and its powers were exercised by the Resident General assisted by a consultative committee comprising five French members and five Tunisians (Chenik, Ben Ammar, Albert Bessis, Ahmed Acacha and Abderrahmane El Louze).

The Grand Council was restored on 3 June 1943 and then completely reconstituted on 15 September 1945. The French and Tunisian sections now had 53 delegates each, but the Tunisian Muslim delegates were still elected indirectly, and the ballot was still not secret. The French and Tunisian sections once again reached deadlock on 1 December 1951. The attempt to break this by calling new elections also ran into trouble, as the Resident General Louis Périllier tried to push ahead while Mohamed Chenik, grand vizir since 17 August 1950, refused to convene the Tunisian electors until his demands for internal autonomy for Tunisia had been met. The Grand Council met for the last time on 9 December 1951, and was then suspended owing to the serious political tensions spreading through the country.

On 4 March 1954, a final attempt was made to set up a Tunisian National Assembly, although the proposal was still based on indirect elections for the Tunisian section, with the French section able to block legislation. Insecurity in the country meant that the proposed elections to this body were never held.

== Bibliography ==
- Marie Dauphin, La Conférence consultative tunisienne (thèse de doctorat), éd. Faculté de droit de Paris, Paris, 1919
- Nazli Hafsia, Les premiers modernistes tunisiens. Abdeljelil Zaouche. 1873-1947, éd. MIM, Tunis, 2007, p. 148 ISBN 9789973736017
- Arfaoui Khémais, Les élections politiques en Tunisie, éd. L'Harmattan, Paris, 2011
