= Tunisian independence =

Tunisian independence from France

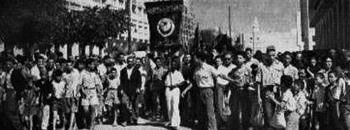
Tunis on 20 March 1956, the day of independence.

Tunisian independence was a process that occurred from 1952 to 1956 between France and an independence movement, led by Habib Bourguiba. Bourguiba's negotiations with France succeeded in ending the colonial protectorate and achieving independence. He subsequently became the first Prime Minister of the Kingdom of Tunisia following the elections of the Constituent Assembly.

== Overview, the road to Tunisian independence ==
The first independence movement was formed by the Young Tunisian Party in 1907. By 1920, the Destour, a Tunisian political party, had formed a powerful base that was supported by the Bey. Their following lasted until 1934, when Neo Destour was formed, and brought about by a new generation of young nationalists striving for independence. With a new energized independence movement, the stage was set for a new leader, Habib Bourguiba.

With the threat of independence, the French immediately banned Neo Destour and sent Bourguiba to a variety of French prisons in France where he spent the next 20 years of his life. World War II brought about a halt in Tunisia's bid for independence, but helped win Bourguiba a transfer from a French prison to an Axis one in Rome. The Nazis attempted to pressure Bourguiba into helping the Axis powers with his influence over the Tunisian independence fighters in pushing back the Allied invasion of North Africa. He refused – primarily due to his belief that Germany would lose the war and was released from prison in 1943 when the Nazi campaign was finally defeated at El Alamein in Egypt. Upon his return to Tunisia, Bourguiba proposed a concept of gradual independence for Tunisia which was supported by most Tunisians. As a means of forcing the French to leave, the Neo Destour returned to armed resistance by carrying attacks on colonial facilities spearheaded by militants such as Chedly Kallala. As a result, from 1952 to 1954, Bourguiba was imprisoned for the attacks, further fueling the fire between Tunisian Independence and French Rule. In June 1954, new French Prime Minister Pierre Mendès France came to power and immediately instituted a withdrawal policy from Tunisia to lessen the violent backlashes occurring in the colonies.

France still retained control of Tunisia's foreign affairs, and gradually the nations returned to the same arrangement of 1881. By November 1955, France granted Morocco independence, which helped pave the way for Tunisia's independence. March 20, 1956, Tunisia achieved independence from France proposed by Habib Bourguiba. France, Tunisia, and Western Powers remained in good relations, and maintain significant economic and cultural links to this day.

== Lamine Bey's rapprochement with the nationalists (1948–1951) ==
After the funeral of Moncef Bey the nationalists of the Neo Destour were more willing to work with Lamine Bey. Salah Ben Youssef met him several times, encouraging him to refuse to apply his seal to laws drafted by the Resident General. Delays in the passing of legislation ensued, and indeed on 1 October 1948 Lamine Bey formally protested when he learned that French residents in Tunisia had been elected to the French National Assembly. Jean Mons was obliged to recognise that once the threat of being deposed had been removed from him, Lamine Bey was determined to win the acclaim of his people and therefore worked willingly with the nationalists. The change of mood was evident on 15 May 1949 on the anniversary of his accession, during a demonstration headed jointly by Ben Youssef and Lamine Bey's own son Chedly. On 4 June, despite Mons' protestations, the Bey received a delegation from the Neo Destour although the party remained under ban following the violent demonstrations of 9 April 1938. In September 1949, the Neo Destourian leader Habib Bourguiba returned to Tunis from exile in Egypt, and one of his first visits was to the Bey.

The following year, seeing that nothing was coming of efforts for reform, the Bey sent a messenger to Mons in March 1950 asking for a response to the proposals he had made eight months previously. Mons warned the French government that if he was unable to give a substantial response, the Bey would withhold his seal from the decree confirming the budget for the protectorate. In April, after a meeting with Bourguiba, the Bey wrote directly to French President Vincent Auriol pressing him to agree reforms admitting Tunisians to a substantially larger share of self-government. The Bey's popularity rose. The first Bey since 1881 to leave Tunis, on 14 April he visited Kairouan and on 30 April Sousse, and he was given a rapturous welcome in both towns. On 19 June, a new Resident General, Louis Périllier, was appointed with an explicit mission from the French Foreign Minister Robert Schuman to prepare Tunisia for internal autonomy.

A new government was formed under M'hamed Chenik, the former Grand Vizier under Moncef Bey, on 17 August 1950. For the first time the Resident General was not able to impose Tunisian ministers of his own choosing. His nomination of Abdelkader Belkhodja was rejected by Chenik, who was supported by the Bey. Chenik was however successful in imposing his own son-in-law Mohamed Ben Salem, as Minister of Health. Mahmoud El Materi, whom the Resident General had put forward for the post, became instead Minister of the Interior.

After five months of negotiations, an initial package of reforms was approved by the Bey on 8 February 1951. Although limited in scope, it was welcomed by Tunisians as a token of future progress. The Bey invested Périllier with the Nichan ad-Dam (Order of the Blood) as a gesture of thanks. However his gratitude was premature as no further negotiations on reforms took place beyond this point. In retaliation Chenik refused to present a budget to the consultative Grand Council, bringing government to an effective standstill. The Bey was able to add his own protest on the occasion of his address from the throne on 15 May 1951. In this speech, read by Hamadi Badra, he set out an unequivocally nationalist direction and expressed strong support for his government in pursuing nationalist goals. Contrary to custom, the speech was not sent in advance to the Resident General. This caused an outcry among the French colonists who regarded it as an affront to French dignity. On 19 May, Périllier, in full uniform, accompanied by a military escort, went for an audience with the Bey to make an official protest at this snub, and to ask for the dismissal of Chenik and Ben Youssef. The following day, the Bey responded with a telegram to President Vincent Auriol, vigorously protesting against the actions and the tone of the Resident General. Faced with this show of determination, Périllier backed down.

To break this impasse, Tunisian ministers were invited to Paris to present their demands. On 16 October 1951 Chenik arrived in Paris and submitted a memorandum to Robert Schuman summarising key Tunisian demands for internal autonomy. The French government responded on 15 December with a flat refusal. With neither the Bey nor the Grand Vizier willing to give ground, Périllier resigned on 24 December.

== Confrontations with De Hautecloque (1952–1953) ==
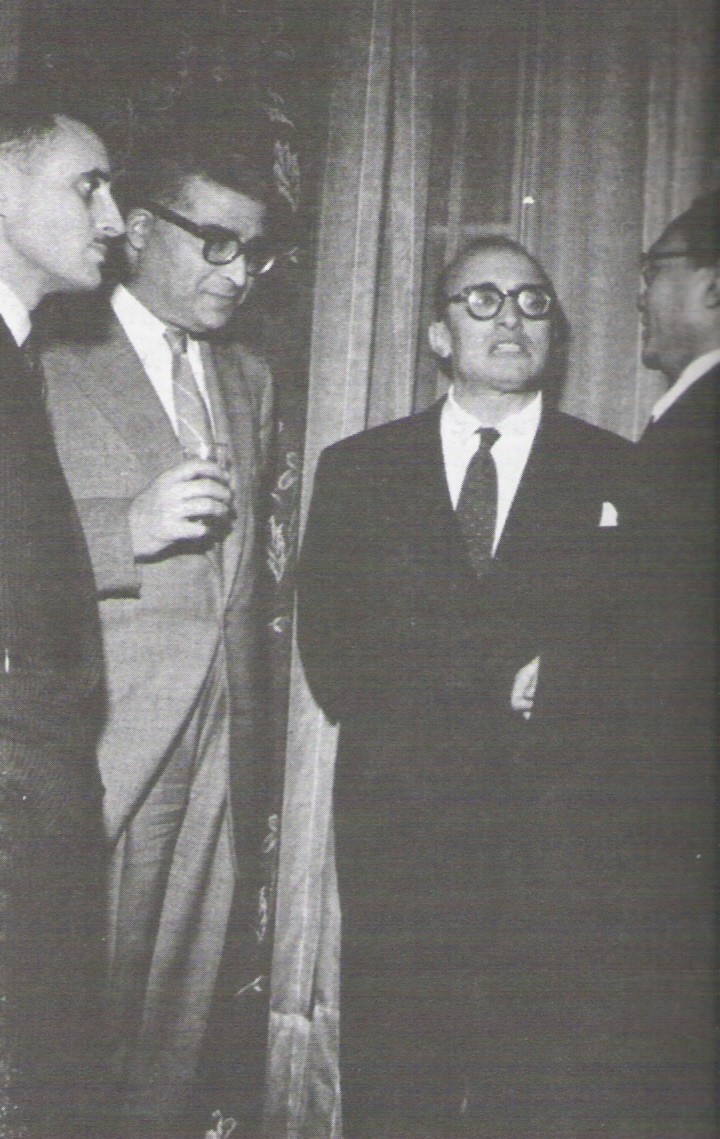
Tunisian delegation to the UN, 1952

On 13 January 1952, the new Resident General Jean de Hauteclocque arrived in Tunis on board the cruiser Le Mercure. He asked for his first audience with the Bey to take place without his ministers present, but Lamine Bey refused this request and it took place with the full Chenik cabinet in attendance. Hautecloque was back again the following day, to demand the withdrawal of a memorandum outlining Tunisian protests about French rule which he had discovered Chenik's cabinet had sent to the United Nations, and the dismissal of the two ministers responsible for delivering it. He obtained no satisfaction in respect of either demand.

The UN memorandum had been drafted following discussions between Chenik and Chedly Bey, who had insisted that his father not be involved in any way. When Chenik approached Lamine Bey directly seeking his support, he responded that it 'was a matter for the government and for ministers' but raised no objections. The memorandum was therefore signed by all Chenik's ministers but did not carry the Bey's seal. Having disclaimed involvement in the memorandum itself, the Bey took no responsibility for its consequences when the two ministers who submitted it, Salah Ben Youssef and Hamadi Badra were eventually forced to resign under French pressure.

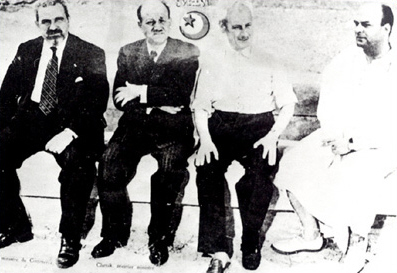
Ministers in the Chenik cabinet exiled in March 1952 (left to right) Mohamed Salah Mzali, M’hamed Chenik, Mahmoud El Materi and Mohamed Ben Salem.

Following this, the congress of the Neo Destour Party was banned and large numbers of nationalists were arrested. Unrest spread and on 24 January De Hauteclocque was obliged to ask the Bey to issue an appeal for calm, agreeing to withdraw his insistence on the resignation of the Chenik government. Lamine Bey refused to oblige him for as long as Bourguiba and his companions remained in prison. The Bey refused to give way even under direct pressure from the French Prime Minister Edgar Faure. On 25 March, unsuccessful in his requests to meet the Bey in private, De Hauteclocque agreed to an audience with Tunisian ministers present. He once again demanded the resignation of the Chenik government, and the Bey responded with another angry telegram to President Vincent Auriol complaining of De Hauteclocque's discourteous and threatening tone. Within a few hours, every minister had been arrested and interned. Deprived of the support of his ministers, on 28 March the Bey eventually gave way and signed the decree naming De Hauteclocque's nominee Slaheddine Baccouche as his Grand Vizier.

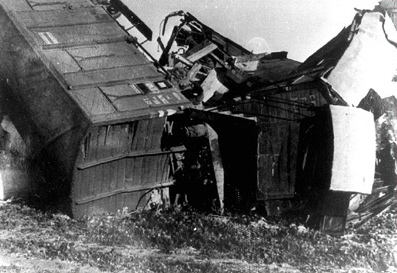
Train sabotaged by militant nationalists

Faced with the imposition of a government they regarded as having no legitimacy, Tunisians protested and demonstrated ever more vigorously. The opposition was so intense that on 14 April Baccouche attempted to present his resignation to the Bey. The Bey responded 'You should not address your resignation to me since I did not appoint you. Address yourself to him who has imposed you on me.' Baccouche remained in office, with the confidence of neither the Bey nor the people. Disturbances continued and there were outbreaks of sabotage. Lamine Bey continued to refuse to issue any appeal for calm for as long as thousands of his subjects remained interned. To increase the pressure on him, his daughter Princess Zakia was arrested on 29 April and accused of plotting sabotage with her friend Rafia Bornaz. The Bey's doctor, Mohamed Ben Salem, was prevented from visiting him despite his suffering from a lung infection. To show his defiance, the Bey went in person to the house of his daughter and her husband, and gave a thousand-franc note to each of the policemen guarding the house in ironic thanks for their valuable 'protection'.

On 7 June, an individual named Mohamed Achouri, one of the entourage of the future Bey al-Mahalla Essadok Bey, surrendered a sachet of poison to the palace doctor Abderrahmen Mami, claiming that he had been ordered to give it to the cook. When questioned, he implicated the Resident General's Chief of Staff Jacques Grellet and a second man known as Jacobson. Despite the matter being the subject of a criminal complaint, Achouri disappeared and the matter was covered up.

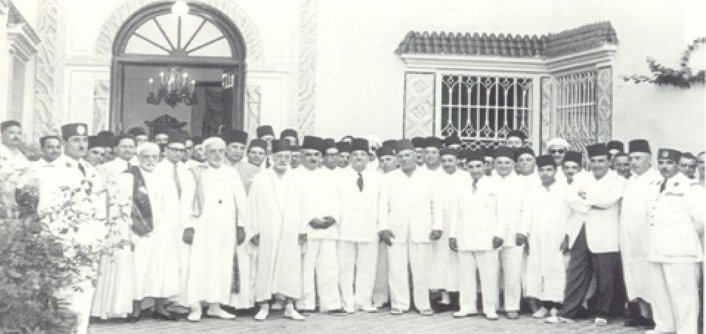
The Assembly of Forty with Lamine Bey

The ministers who had been interned were gradually released, and some gathered around Lamine Bey to offer him support. Determined to boycott the Baccouche government, the Bey relied more and more on his son Chedly and surrounded himself with counsellors he felt he could trust, including Mzali, Farhat Hached, Hédi Nouira and Sadok Mokaddem. Without a properly-functioning government, proposals for reform were unilaterally issued from Paris and presented to the Bey for his signature on 28 July. To the chagrin of De Hauteclocque, Lamine Bey refused to sign them straight away and said he would take two or three months to consider them. On 1 August, he brought together in his palace in Carthage forty leading Tunisian figures representing a range of views to seek their opinions on the proposals from France. After a month of debates and consultations, the Assembly of Forty rejected the French proposals as unsatisfactory. According to Ahmed Mestiri the minute outlining the rejection was drafted in secret by the underground leadership of the Neo Destour before being passed to the Assembly through Hached and Mokaddem and approved by them. On 9 September 1952, the Bey sent a letter to the Resident General, addressed to President Auriol, declaring his refusal to sign the reform proposals. Soon after Lamine Bey confided his despondency about the future to Ben Salem: 'There is nothing to hope for from different French governments. I am old and tired. It may be that I will never see our country independent, but never mind..... when one plants a tree, one must not hope at the same time to eat its fruits.'

== Assassinations and terror (1952–1953) ==
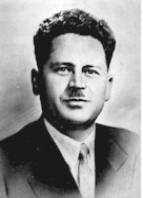
Farhat Hached

The Resident General persisted in his attempts to pressure the Bey into signing the French reforms. On 30 November, he surrounded the palace with troops, on the pretext of protecting the Bey from the large demonstrations expected for the Mawlid festival. With all his nationalist advisers either in prison or in exile, the Bey had no-one to support him apart from Farhat Hached, the trade union leader, who visited him every day, encouraging him to stand firm. On 5 December 1952, Hached was assassinated by 'La Main Rouge' (The Red Hand), a terrorist unit operated by the French state to eliminate nationalists in North Africa. Anyone else who might advise or support the Bey was kept out of the way: Mohamed Salah Mzali was obliged to leave Tunis and remain in Monastir and when he tried to telephone the palace he found that all the lines had been cut. Completely cut off from the outside world, the ailing Bey wrote to the French government once again asking to restart negotiations about internal autonomy. With France's negative response on 20 December, he was able to resist no longer, and signed the decrees formulated months previously in Paris, which allowed for new municipal elections.

Bourguiba, in exile on the Galite Islands, understood all too well the extreme pressure which the Bey had withstood for so long. When he learned that he had finally given way and authorised the French proposals, he remarked 'I don't think we need to throw stones at this venerable old man who struggles alone in almost desperate conditions against an enemy who has no conscience and can exert such pressure. He may have thought... that it was better to bend once again than to be broken.' In any case, the reforms imposed by the French, on which they set such great store, remained a dead letter – the nationalists launched a campaign of terror against both candidates and voters. This extended as far as the ruling family itself – on 1 July 1953 the Bey al-Mahalla Azzedine Bey was assassinated inside his own palace, accused of weakening the position of the Bey by conducting discussions of his own with the Resident General. Arrested on the spot, the assassin was tried before a military tribunal, condemned to death on 28 September 1953 and shot on 14 April 1954. Essadok Bey, son of Mustapha Bey, became the new Bey al-Mahalla. He was not regarded sympathetic to the Neo Destour. On 2 September 1953, Jean de Hauteclocque was finally recalled to Paris.

== The Mzali government (1953–1954) ==
Tensions eased somewhat with the arrival of the new Resident General, Pierre Voizard. As soon as he arrived, Lamine Bey issued a call for calm – something he had always refused to do with De Hauteclocque. Thousands of prisoners were freed and censorship was scaled back. However Voizard's instructions from the French government made the relative calm only temporary – he was to pursue a reform policy with the Bey only, but not with the Neo Destour. France hoped by this means to drive a wedge between the ruler and the militant nationalists. Lamine Bey was too wily to be deceived by the apparently pleasant demeanour of the new Resident General. On 16 October 1953 he refused to preside at the opening of the Tunis-Carthage Fair because some repressive measures were still in place. More efforts were made to appease him – on 1 January 1954 a number of nationalist leaders were freed and promptly received by the Bey. Bourguiba however, regarded by France as highly dangerous, remained confined on La Galite, despite Voizard's requests for his release.

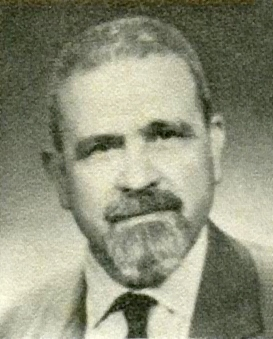
Mohamed Salah Mzali

On 24 November 1953, the Bey appointed Mzali to negotiate a new reform package with the Resident General. On 18 January 1954, sufficient progress had been made that the Bey asked him to form a new government. The key elements in the newly-agreed structure of government were – the majority of ministers were to be Tunisians; the Grand Vizier was to act as head of the government; the assent of the Resident General was no longer to be required to give effect to governmental decrees; local governors and mayors were to be appointed by and responsible to the Grand Vizier and not to the Resident General; and a national assembly was to be created. A number of nationalists, including Hédi Nouira, were willing to give these reforms a chance, but the refusal to free Bourguiba remained a stumbling block for many Tunisians, and indeed, for Bourguiba himself. 'The failure of an old man terrorised by the fear of deposition and exile, combined with the vile ambition of an unscrupulous adventurer risk depriving Tunisia of the only asset that remains to it: it standing as a nation state; its legal character, recognised internationally by treaty and confirmed by the General Assembly of the United Nations. Suddenly my release has been postponed indefinitely' he commented. On 27 May, Bourguiba, who had recently been transferred from La Gailte to custody in France, returned to the Bey the Grand Cross of the Nichan Iftikhar which he had received in 1950.

Mzali's cabinet resigned on 17 June 1954 and no successor was appointed. Bitter at the defeat of his efforts, the Bey confided to Voizard 'For a year, since I have been asking for Bourguiba to be released or transferred to a spa, I have received nothing but threats. Then you transfer him to a remote island without seeking my opinion. Now you are transferring him close to Paris, depriving me of the goodwill I might have earned by securing this move for him. I am ready to take up my rifle and become a fellagha to rebuild my contact with my people, for you have done everything possible to separate me from them.'

== Independence talks (1954–1956) ==
On 31 July 1954, the new French Prime Minister Pierre Mendès France arrived in Tunis. He was received by Lamine Bey in the palace of Carthage, where he announced internal autonomy for Tunisia. This was a welcome surprise for the Bey, who had been kept at arm's length from the negotiations between Mendès France and the Neo Destourians before his visit. Shortly afterwards, the Bey addressed his subjects: 'A new phase has just begun in the life of our beloved country. It is hard for us to recall the painful days that all of Tunisia has lived through.... before this decisive step in our national life, we must stand equal to our destiny in offering to the world the spectacle of a united people marching serenely towards progress. This great constructive effort to which we are summoned can only bear fruit for us through order, peace and security, which all the inhabitants of this country have the right to enjoy.' There was no doubt however that the balance of forces had shifted decisively away from the Bey. For France, the experience of the failed Mzali government highlighted the futility of hoping to evolve political institutions by means of negotiating only with the Bey. The new Resident General, Pierre Boyer de Latour was quick to understand this and it was now the Neo Destour who were the sole interlocutors for the Tunisian people.

Despite the repeated efforts of the Bey, a new government was formed without consulting the palace. To recover some semblance of his former influence, on 10 August he proposed to the French government that the institution of the beylicate should be replaced with a full monarchy, which would give him the authority he felt was appropriate. He was willing, in return, to sign supplementary agreements to the Treaty of Bardo necessary to maintain Franco-Tunisian cooperation and preserve the French presence in Tunisia. At the same time, he opened communications with Salah ben Youssef, in exile in Geneva. None of these approaches led to anything.

After six months of negotiation, the autonomy accords were signed on 3 June 1955. Bourguiba had returned to Tunis on 1 June, welcomed as he came down the gangplank by the Bey's three sons, and by a giant demonstration of Tunisians. Having crossed the capital in triumph, Bourguiba visited the Bey in Carthage, apparently unmindful of having returned his decoration only a few months before, and made a stirring declaration of the deep attachment felt by the Tunisian people towards beylical rule. On 7 August, the Bey applied his seal to the conventions agreed with France and on 1 September, for the first time since the protectorate was established in 1881, he applied his seal to decrees that had not been authorised by the Resident General. On 29 December 1955, his seal confirmed a decree establishing a Constituent Assembly for the country, with elections to be held on 8 April 1956. Tunisia appeared to be evolving into a constitutional monarchy.

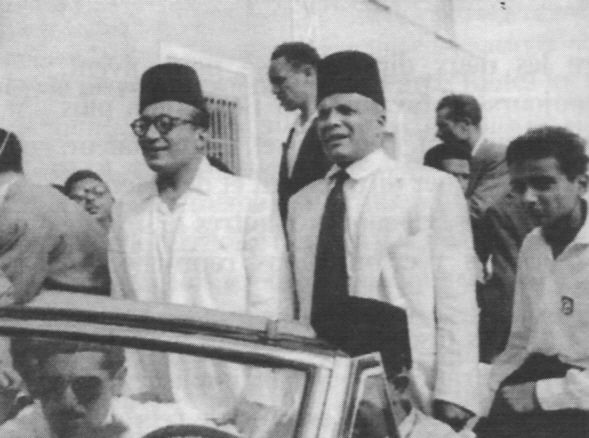
Salah Ben Youssef arrives in Tunis, 13 September 1955

In fact, power continued to ebb rapidly away from Lamine Bey as independence approached. Salah Ben Youssef returned from exile on 13 September 1955, giving the Bey hopes that his political power would start to be restored. He was close to Ben Youssef, who had been one of the few politicians to pay his respects to him at the time of his installation in 1943. However violence quickly erupted between followers of Ben Youssef and those of Bourguiba, leaving the Bey to vainly attempt to act as arbiter between them. The French had already transferred authority over the police force from the Resident General to the Tunisian government, whose ministers had been chosen by Bourguiba, so Ben Youssef's representations to the Bey had no effect. On 2 December, the Bey summoned the Resident General (now known as the High Commissioner) Roger Seydoux to remind him of France's responsibility for public order – which in fact it no longer had. In effect, the Bey was appealing for a restoration of colonial powers from the nationalist government. As his appeals had no effect he made use of the only power remaining to him and refused to apply his seal to the decrees authorising the forthcoming elections and the appointment of local governors and mayors. This move was welcomed by Ben Youssef, who demanded a ministerial reshuffle, but naturally alienated the Bey further from Bourguiba and his followers. He backed down and signed them the following day. Ben Youssef fled the country on 28 January and a crackdown followed on his followers in Tunisia, in which Bourguiba relied on the army, with its French officers, the airforce and heavy artillery. Horrified at this brutality, Lamine Bey renewed his ineffective protestations to Seydoux in April 1956. The only effect was to enrage Bourguiba, who hastened to the palace to accuse the Bey and his family of seeking to hinder the transfer of power from France to the Tunisian government.

On 20 March 1956, the Franco-Tunisian protocol was signed by the Grand Vizier Tahar Ben Ammar and the French Foreign Minister Christian Pineau. The new Tunisian government, led by Bourguiba, deemed the country to be independent by virtue of this protocol, and therefore refused to enter into the subsequent bilateral negotiations it provided for. Independence was regarded as a fait accompli, and for this reason the independence protocol was never ratified either by the Bey, or indeed by France, although this is what the protocol on internal autonomy required.

== French military occupation of Bizerte-Ferryville and southern Tunisia (1956–1963) ==
Military zone of Bizerte-Ferryville (1956–1963)

Military zone in southern Tunisia (1956–1958)

After Tunisia was granted independence in 1956 the French military stayed in Tunisia and maintained full control of the cities and naval bases at Bizerte and Ferryville as well as a "military zone" in southern Tunisia. France occupied these areas because they viewed these areas of Tunisia as crucial to assist their efforts in the Algerian War.

In 1957–58 conflict broke out between France and Tunisia as a result of indirect support by the Tunisian government to the FLN rebels in the Algerian War. Tunisia pushed the United Nations, United States, and NATO to force France to abide by the independence agreement of 1956 and vacate all French military zones in Tunisia. In June 1958, France compromised and agreed to retreat from all of Tunisia except for Bizerte. The southern Tunisia zone and part of the Bizerte-Ferryville zone were handed over to the Tunisian government.

By 1961 the Algerian War was in the final stages which would lead to an eventual French evacuation. Tunisia also wanted all French soldiers to leave Tunisian territory because the French excuse to keep numerous bases in Tunisia no longer existed. In July 1961, the Tunisian military blockaded the French military in Bizerte. The French responded with airstrikes and a ground incursion into Tunisian territory to break the blockade. 630 Tunisian troops and about 30 French troops were killed in the battle. While France won this battle the writing was on the wall for the French presence in Tunisia. The French attack on Tunisia to break the siege upset many Tunisians and tensions between the French military and Tunisian government got worse afterwards. In October 1963, France fully withdrew from Bizerte-Ferryville.

== See also ==
- Tunisian national movement
- Bizerte crisis
- Algerian War

== Bibliography ==
- Ben Salem, Mohamed (1988). L'antichambre de l'indépendance. Tunis: Cérès Productions. ISBN 9973-700-00-7. OCLC 19348166.
- Brady, Thomas F. (31 July 1961). "Tunisians Bitter Over U.N. Failure On Bizerte Crisis; Say Council Is 'Incapable' of Concrete Decisions – Assembly Call Expected". The New York Times. ISSN 0362-4331.
- Brecher, Michael (2022) [1997]. A study of crisis. Jonathan Wilkenfeld, Michigan Publishing. Ann Arbor, Michigan. ISBN 978-0-472-90312-2. OCLC 1334011126.
- Chater, Kalifa (2010). Tahar Ben Ammar, 1889-1985. Tunis: Éditions Nirvana. ISBN 978-9973-855-20-6. OCLC 620103598.
- Hached, Anissa El Materi (2011). Mahmoud El Materi, pionnier de la Tunisie moderne. Paris: Les Belles Lettres.
- Mestiri, Saïd. (1991). Le ministère Chenik à la poursuite de l'autonomie interne : de la déclaration de Thionville à l'exil de Kebili. Tunis: Arcs Editions. ISBN 9973-740-04-1. OCLC 30589215.
- Mistīrī, Aḥmad (2011). Témoignage pour l'histoire : des souvenirs, quelques réflexions et commentaires sur une époque contemporaine de la Tunisie, accessoirement du Maghreb (1940-1990) et sur la révolution de 2010-2011. Tunis. ISBN 978-9938-01-051-0. OCLC 846892054.
- Mons, Jean (1981). Sur les routes de l'histoire: cinquante ans au service de l'État. Paris: Albatros.
- Mzali, Mohamed Salah (1972). Mzali, Hassan (ed.). Au fil de ma vie. Tunis.
- Ounaies, Ahmed (2010). Histoire générale de la Tunisie : L’Époque contemporaine (1881–1956). Vol. 4 (Sud Éditions, Tunis ed.). ISBN 978-9938-01-022-0.
- Périllier, Louis (1979). La conquête de l'indépendance tunisienne : souvenirs et témoignages. Paris: R. Laffont. ISBN 2-221-00337-3. OCLC 6278593.
- Sayah, Mohamed (1979a). Tunis : Dar El Amal (ed.). Histoire du mouvement national tunisien. Le Néo-Destour face à la troisième épreuve, 1952–1956, tome I « L'échec de la répression. Centre de Documentation Nationale.
- Sayah, Mohamed (1979b). Tunis : Dar El Amal (ed.). Néo-Destour face à la troisième épreuve 1952-1956 (Le). 2, La Victoire / textes réunis et commentés par Mohamed Sayah [Histoire du mouvement national tunisien : documents.] Centre de Documentation Nationale.
