= Tunisian insurrection (1952–1954) =

Tunisian Guerrilla
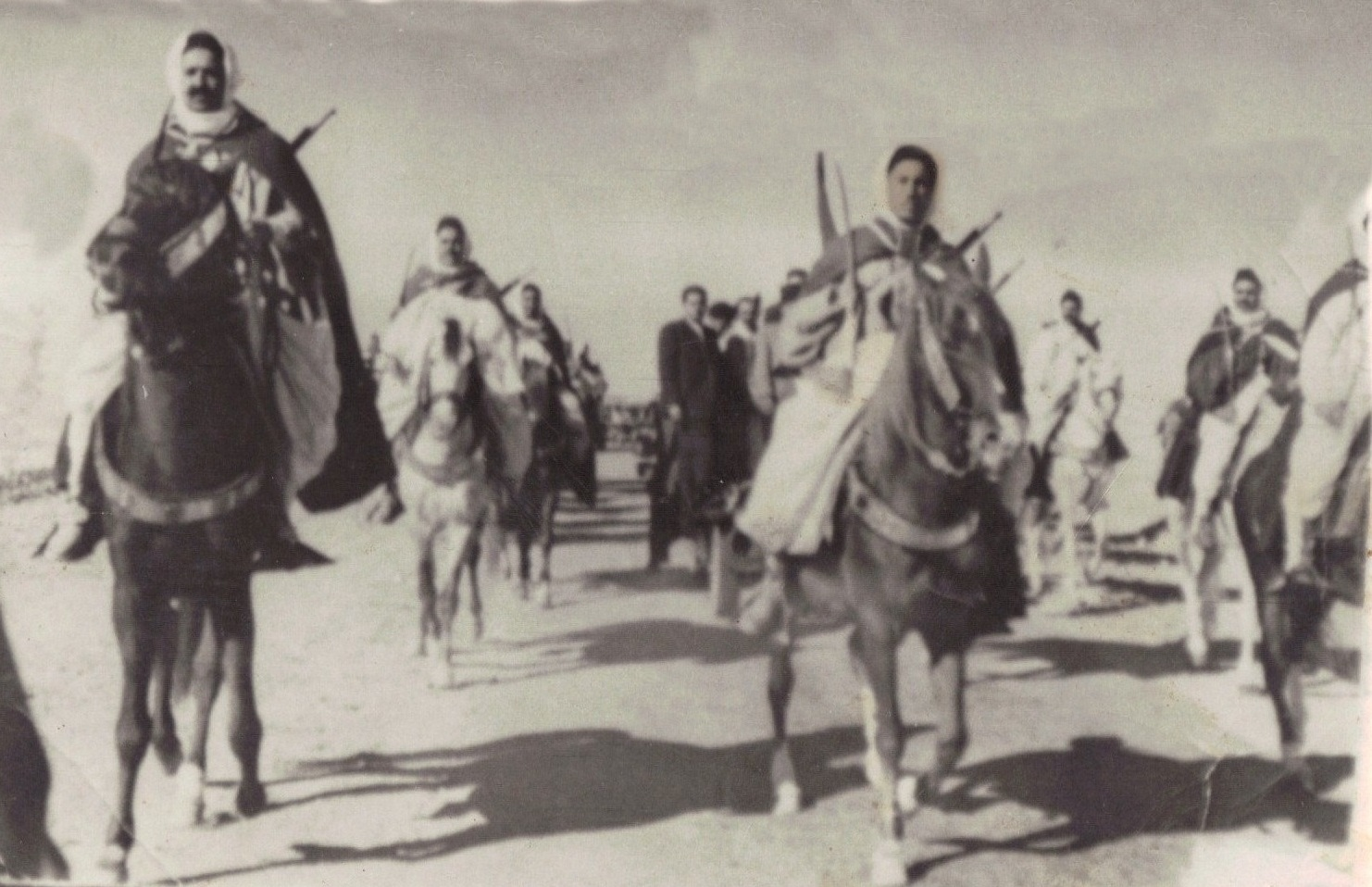
- Tunisian fellaghas on horseback
Date	1952–1954
Location	Tunisia
Result	Fellagha victory

Belligerents
(Tunisia) Fellagha	France

Commanders and leaders
Unknown	Unknown

Strength
several thousand soldiers	Unknown

Casualties and losses
Unknown	Unknown

An armed insurrection took place in Tunisia from 1952 to 1954, led by nationalist organizations like Neo-Destour and the fellagha against the French protectorate.

== Background ==
On 29 November 1951, a general strike was organized to pressure the Bey of Tunis and the French colonial authorities. About a month later, tensions subsided temporarily, but from 21 to 23 December, the movement evolved into a nationwide strike. In January 1952, the strikes spread to the cities of Bizerte and Ferryville, prompting the French authorities to launch a major wave of arrests targeting members of the Neo Destour and the Tunisian Communist Party. Among those arrested was Habib Bourguiba, who was imprisoned on 18 January 1952.

These repressive measures triggered further strikes organized by workers, traders, and craftsmen. Armed resistance and guerrilla activity emerged in southern Tunisia, to which the French responded with military sweeps, particularly in the Cape Bon area. On 25 March 1952, the head of the Tunisian government was arrested, and political leader Salah Ben Youssef fled the country.

== Conflict ==
Starting in 1952, the Fellagha intensified their attacks. On 11 April 1952, a strike took place in Sousse, coinciding with the explosion of homemade bombs in Tunis and Sousse. That same day, 16 Tunisian nationalists were arrested for possessing weapons—2 in Manouba and 14 in Zaghouan.

On 27 April, two bombs exploded in front of two French companies in Tunis. School strikes occurred in six colleges, including one in Sousse, Kala Kebira, and M’saken. On 4 May, incidents included stone-throwing at trams in Tunis, sabotage of the railway line at Sidi Bou Ali, bombings in French facilities in Sfax and Gafsa, and an attempted bombing of the power station in Sousse. Demonstrations were also organized in Zaghouan, and over 37 Tunisians were tried by military courts after protesting in front of the French Residence.

On 18 May, acts of sabotage occurred in Bizerte, the post office in Sfax was bombed, and there was an attempted sabotage of the Sousse–Sfax railcar. A bomb was thrown at the home of the French vice-mayor in Djerba. On 17 September, two settlers were attacked in Kasserine. On 6 December, explosions occurred near the gendarmerie in La Marsa, an attack targeted a mobile guard unit in Hammamet, and a settler was assaulted in Tunis. Firefights broke out in Gafsa between local inhabitants and French colonial forces. On 16 December, a skirmish erupted between a commando from Tripolitania and colonial troops in southern Tunisia.

By 1954, guerrilla warfare escalated. More than 6,000 insurgents operated in dozens of small commandos, conducting attacks in towns and villages, and looting and burning farms owned by French settlers.

Notable incidents include the 3 June 1954 assassination of five French settlers by Fellagha in the El Kef region, and the 26 May 1954 attack on two farms near El Ksour, which resulted in the deaths of two brothers. These attacks were carried out in retaliation for the assassination of Ali and Tahar Haffouz by the group known as La Main Rouge.

In some cases, guerrilla warfare escalated into open battles. On 9 October 1954, a French force of 1,800 soldiers from the Gafsa and Gabès regions engaged a 282-man Fellagha commando in the region of Tamerza. The confrontation ended in a French defeat, with over 200 casualties and one aircraft destroyed. Other significant battles include: the Battle of Djebel Mitr, the Battle of Al Ghandri, the Battle of Djebel Orbata, the Battle of Djebel Ichkeul, the Battle of Ouled Omrane, and the Battle of Ebba Ksour.

Under sustained pressure from the Fellagha, French Prime Minister Pierre Mendès France initiated negotiations with the Tunisian national movement. In Carthage in July 1954, he officially recognized the internal autonomy of Tunisia. The French military began withdrawing, with 50,000 troops eventually retreating in the face of around 2,000 Tunisian fighters. This marked both a military and diplomatic victory for the Tunisian nationalists.
