= Mohamed Salah Mzali =

Tunisian educator, historian, & politician (1896–1984)

- محمد الصالح مزالي
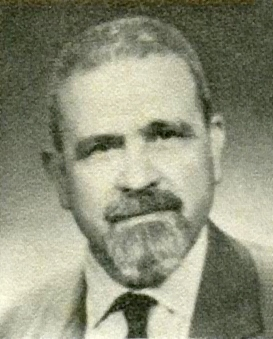

Prime Minister of Tunisia
- In office 2 March 1954 – 17 June 1954
- Monarch: Muhammad VIII
- Preceded by: Slaheddine Baccouche
- Succeeded by: Tahar Ben Ammar (Indirectly)

Personal details
- Born: 11 February 1896 Monastir, French Tunisia
- Died: 22 November 1984 (aged 88)
- Profession: Educator, Politician

Mohamed Salah Mzali (11 February 1896 – 22 November 1984) was a Tunisian educator, historian and politician. He was Prime Minister of Tunisia for a brief period in 1954 under Muhammad VIII al-Amin.

Mohamed Salah Mzali is a descent of the Ait Mzal, a shleuh berber tribe located in the region of Souss. he is also a relative of Mohammed Mzali.

== Biography ==
For ten years, he followed a government career at the head of the ministries of Habous, Trade and Handicrafts and Industry, including the second government of Chenik in 1950. He was arrested and deported to the south of the country with the entire government during the crackdown of March 1952.

Released a year later, he was chosen by the colonial authorities to form a government in February 1953. On 2 March, he was appointed Grand Vizier. His government, composed of competent and honest administrators. Mzali is also a member of the steering committee of the Carthage Institute and the editorial board of the Tunisian Journal; he also collaborates with Al Fajr magazine, Al Majalla zeitounia, etc.

He is a laureate of the Alliance Française, the Académie des Jeux Floraux and other literary competitions.

== Publications ==
- L'Hérédité dans la dynastie husseinite: évolution et violations
- Au fil de ma vie: souvenirs d'un Tunisien
