= Lamine Bey =

Ruler of Tunisia from 1943 to 1957

King of Tunisia
- Reign: 20 March 1956 – 25 July 1957
- Successor: Monarchy abolished Habib Bourguiba (as President of Tunisia)

Bey of Tunis
- Reign: 15 May 1943 – 20 March 1956
- Predecessor: Moncef Bey
- Successor: Beylik abolished
- Born: Muhammad el-Amine Bey; 4 September 1881; Carthage, French Tunisia
- Died: 30 September 1962 (aged 81); Tunis, Tunisia
- Burial: Cemetery of Sidi Abdulaziz, La Marsa, Tunisia
- Spouse: Lalla Jeneïna Beya (m. 1902; died 1960)
- Issue: Princess Lalla Zakia; Princess Lalla Aïcha; Princess Lalla Khadija; Prince Chedly Bey; Princess Lalla Soufia; Prince Mohammed Bey; Prince Salaheddine Bey; Princess Lalla Zeneïkha Zanoukha; Princess Lalla Fatma; Princess Lalla Kabboura; Princess Zakoua; Princess Lalla Lilia; Princess Lalla Hédia
- Name in Arabic: محمد الأمين باي بن محمد الحبيب
- Dynasty: Husainid Dynasty
- Father: Muhammad VI al-Habib
- Mother: Lalla Fatouma El-Ismaila
- Religion: Islam

Muhammad el-Amine Bey bin Muhammad el-Habib (Arabic: محمد الأمين باي بن محمد الحبيب, romanized: Muḥammad al-Amīn Bāy bin Muḥammad al-Ḥabīb; 4 September 1881 – 30 September 1962), commonly known as Lamine Bey, was the last Bey of Tunis (15 May 1943 – 20 March 1956), and also the only King of Tunisia after independence.

Lamine Bey was enthroned in unusual circumstances following the removal of his predecessor Moncef Bey by the French Resident General Henri Giraud in 1943. It was not until Moncef Bey's death in 1948 that Lamine Bey's legitimacy was recognized by the people of Tunisia. He took steps to align himself with the Tunisian national movement against the French protectorate but was sidelined by the Neo Destour after he accepted French-initiated reforms in 1954. Shortly after independence, Lamine Bey was turned out of his palace along with his family. Their property was seized and several family members were imprisoned. He ended his days living in a small apartment in Tunis.

== Bey al-Mahalla (Crown Prince) ==
On 19 June 1942 Ahmed II died and was succeeded by Moncef Bey. In accordance with tradition on 25 June Moncef Bey named Lamine Bey Bey al-Mahalla, or heir apparent, decorated him with the Ahd El-Amane and made him a Divisional General. A month later he had an opportunity to display his loyalty to his sovereign when he was contacted by one of the court counsellors, General M'hammed Belkhodja. Belkhodja, fearing for his own political future, was trying to persuade the French Resident General Jean-Pierre Esteva to depose Moncef Bey. Lamine Bey however warned the ruler of this conspiracy and Belkhodja was expelled from the palace on 30 July.

== Replacement of Moncef Bey ==
Towards the end of the Tunisian Campaign in May 1943 General Alphonse Juin, Commander in Chief of French forces in North Africa, arrived in Tunis with orders to depose Moncef Bey for alleged attempts to collaborate with Axis forces during the occupation and for an indulgent attitude to the actions of the militant nationalist Destour party. After investigating the Bey's conduct, Juin could find no grounds for condemning him, but his orders were explicit. He tried to persuade Moncef to abdicate, but he refused. Juin therefore visited Lamine in his villa in La Marsa to make sure that he would not refuse the throne if it was offered, but Lamine at first refused to give this undertaking. Eventually Juin prevailed on him to agree, largely because of the benefits to his family. As Moncef Bey refused to abdicate, General Giraud removed him on 14 May 1943.

Lamine Bey was installed on 15 May 1943 at the Bardo palace by General Juin, who invested him at the same time with the Légion d'honneur. He then received the homage of other princes of the royal family, ministers, court officials and members of the consular corps. For this occasion he reinstated the kissing of the hand, which his predecessor had abolished. That same day, Muhammad Chenik presented the resignation of his government and was replaced by Slaheddine Baccouche. As was the norm under the French protectorate, the Bey was not consulted on the choice of ministers (the Chenik government appointed by Moncef Bey had been an exception to this rule). It was only on 6 July that Moncef Bey eventually abdicated, thereby rendering Lamine Bey's accession legitimate. For most Tunisians however, Lamine Bey was still considered to be a usurper.

Lamine Bey
- Royal Family of Tunisia

== Early reign (1943–1948) ==
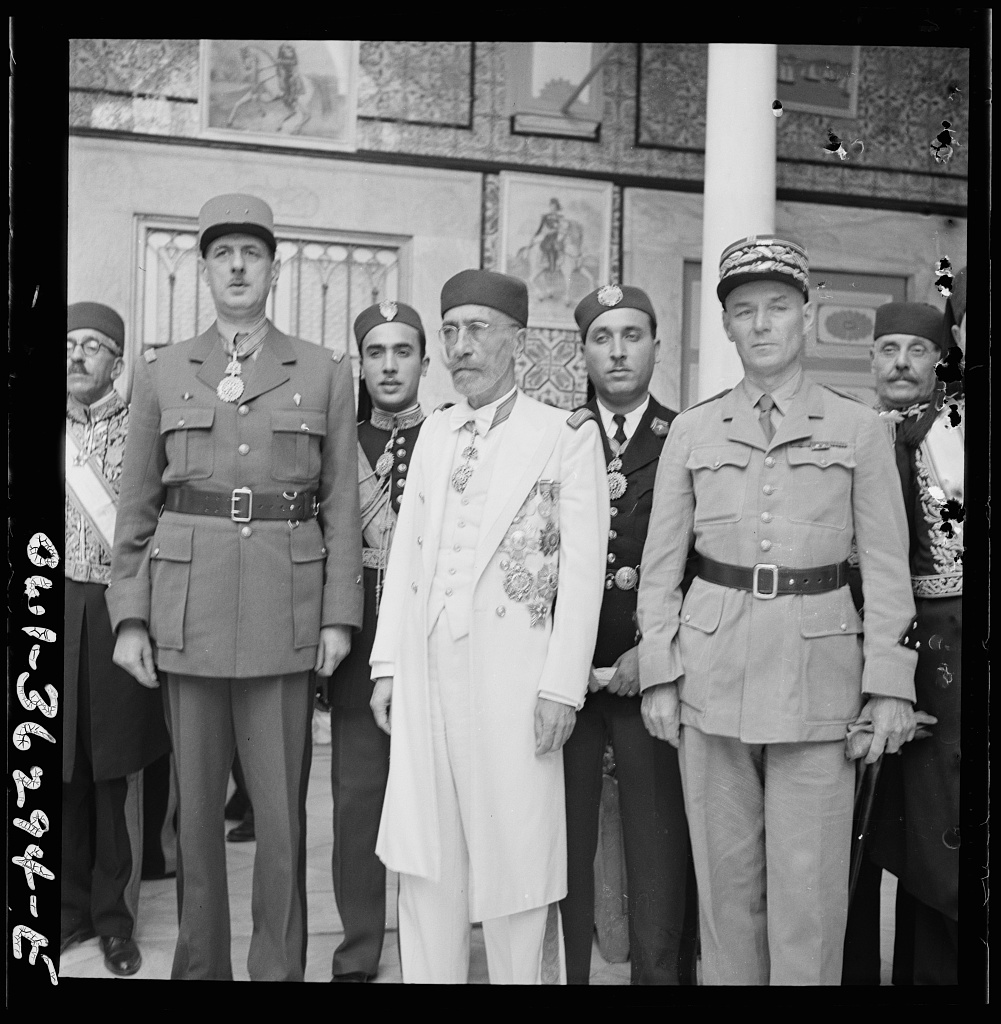
General De Gaulle welcomed by Lamine Bey and Resident General Mast.

Lamine Bey kept a low profile in the face of demands from loyalists for the return of Moncef Bey. His rare appearances showed that his subjects were indifferent to him, or indeed hostile. To rebuild his standing, he supported the teachers of the University of Ez-Zitouna who were striking in December 1943 and chose Neo Destourians as ministers. Nevertheless, the general opinion was that he wanted to abdicate and restore the throne to Moncef Bey. When these rumours were denied, his popularity fell again.

On 7 May 1944 Charles de Gaulle visited Tunis on the first anniversary of its liberation from the Axis. Tunisians hoped that he would reverse the injustice of his old rival Giraud and restore Moncef Bey, but the Moncefists were disappointed in this hope. Instead De Gaulle presented Lamine Bey a Cross of Lorraine in gold, having learned that during the Axis occupation he used to listen secretly to De Gaulle's broadcasts from London. The Bey wore this on his uniform next to his decorations for a long time afterwards.

Hostility towards the Bey showed no signs of decreasing. He was boycotted by the other Husainid princes when he went to the mosque for Eid al-Fitr. To raise his prestige, he was invited to Paris where he attended the military parades on 14 July 1945, standing next to De Gaulle. He then went on to visit Germany. For Tunisians however, he remained 'The Bey of the French'. In August 1946 when the capital was at a standstill during a general strike to protest the arrest of several nationalists, he feigned ill-health to cancel the ceremony of kissing hands which he was due to hold for Eid al-Fitr, but when he passed through the streets of Tunis in February 1947 on the Mawlid festival, he could readily see his subjects' indifference. The anniversary of his accession was regarded by shopkeepers as a good occasion to close their premises and put up portraits of his predecessor. People even spat on his car. His health deteriorated in the face of this hatred and in 1947 an x-ray revealed a lesion in his left lung. Dr. Muhammad Ben Salem (1915–2001), husband of his daughter Princess Zakia, became his doctor and later his political advisor as well.

On 3 March 1947, the new French Resident General Jean Mons arrived in Tunis. The political situation had remained unchanged since the end of the war – the Destour and Neo Destour could agree on nothing except the demand to remove Lamine Bey and reinstate his predecessor. The court was consumed by a morbid obsession with his restoration. Indeed, the mood was so pervasive that Mons suggested to the French government that they proceed to restore Moncef Bey. Prime Minister Paul Ramadier refused, fearing the adverse reaction of French settlers in North Africa. On 19 July 1947 a new Grand Vizier, Mustapha Kaak, was appointed by the Resident General. For the first time, there was parity between Tunisians and French in the government.

Moncef Bey died in exile on 1 September 1948. His remains were brought to Tunis on 5 September for burial, and thousands of Tunisians turned out to pay their respects to him. His family threatened to boycott the ceremony if Lamine Bey attended, and he made no effort to present his condolences to them. However this was a turning point for his reign, as the possibility of Moncef Bey's restoration was now removed, and for the first time, his people began to regard him as their legitimate ruler.

== Closer relations with the nationalist movement (1948–1953) ==
After the death of Moncef Bey, relations between Lamine Bey and the nationalists improved. The Bey worked clandestinely with Habib Bourguiba and Salah Ben Youssef to raise demands for Tunisian self-government and during the period 1948–1951 was able to put the French authorities under considerable pressure. In 1952 a new Resident General took office, Jean de Hauteclocque, who took a much harder line than his predecessor and imprisoned Bourguiba and other nationalist leaders. The Bey sent an angry telegram to President Vincent Auriol complaining of Hauteclocque's discourteous and threatening tone. The only result was that within a few hours, every one of his ministers had been arrested and interned. Deprived of the support of his ministers, on 28 March the Bey eventually gave way and signed the decree naming Hauteclocque's nominee Slaheddine Baccouche as his Grand Vizier. However, he refused to sign any decrees issued by the Baccouche cabinet or by the Resident General, bringing government to a standstill and producing deadlock.

With all his ministers and advisers in prison, Lamine Bey relied on the counsel and support of the trade union leader Farhat Hached, but in December 1952 Hached was assassinated by extremist French settlers of La Main Rouge. Unable to resist Hauteclocque any longer, Lamine Bey eventually signed the decrees on limited internal autonomy which had been formulated months previously in Paris, thereby allowing new municipal elections to take place. However, the reforms imposed by the French remained a dead letter – the nationalists launched a campaign of terror against both candidates and voters. This extended as far as the ruling family itself – on 1 July 1953 the Bey's heir apparent Azzedine Bey was assassinated inside his own palace, accused of conducting discussions of his own with the Resident General.

On 2 September 1953, Jean de Hauteclocque was finally recalled to Paris and the new Resident General, Pierre Voizard, took a more conciliatory line. Thousands of prisoners were freed and censorship was scaled back. However Voizard's instructions from the French government made the relative calm only temporary – he was to pursue a reform policy with the Bey only, but not with the Neo Destour. France hoped by this means to drive a wedge between the ruler and the militant nationalists. Lamine Bey was too wily to be deceived by the apparently pleasant demeanour of the new Resident General. On 16 October 1953 he refused to preside at the opening of the Tunis-Carthage Fair, on the grounds that some repressive measures were still in place. More efforts were made to appease him – on 1 January 1954 a number of nationalist leaders were freed and promptly received by the Bey. Bourguiba, however, regarded by France as highly dangerous, remained confined on La Galite.

== Estrangement from the nationalist movement (1953–1956) ==
With Bourguiba still in exile, Lamine Bey asked Muhammad Salah Mzali to negotiate a new reform package with the Resident General. On 18 January 1954, sufficient progress had been made that the Bey asked him to form a new government. A number of nationalists, including Hédi Nouira, were willing to give these reforms a chance, but the French refusal to free Bourguiba remained a stumbling block for many Tunisians, and indeed, for Bourguiba himself. 'The failure of an old man terrorized by the fear of deposition and exile, combined with the vile ambition of an unscrupulous adventurer risk depriving Tunisia of the only asset that remains to it: it standing as a nation state; its legal character, recognized internationally by treaty and confirmed by the General Assembly of the United Nations. Suddenly my release has been postponed indefinitely' he commented. On 27 May Bourguiba, who had recently been transferred from La Gailte to custody in France, returned to the Bey the Grand Cross of the Nichan Iftikhar which he had received in 1950.

Mzali's cabinet resigned on 17 June 1954 and no successor was appointed. Bitter at the defeat of his efforts, the Bey confided to Voizard 'For a year, since I have been asking for Bourguiba to be released or transferred to a spa, I have received nothing but threats. Then you transfer him to a remote island without seeking my opinion. Now you are transferring him close to Paris, depriving me of the goodwill I might have earned by securing this move for him. I am ready to take up my rifle and become a fellagha to rebuild my contact with my people, for you have done everything possible to separate me from them.'

On 31 July 1954 the new French Prime Minister, Pierre Mendès France, arrived in Tunis. He was received by Lamine Bey in the Royal Palace of Carthage, where he announced internal autonomy for Tunisia. This was a welcome surprise for the Bey, who had been kept at arm's length from the negotiations between Mendès France and the Neo Destourians before his visit. Shortly afterwards, the Bey addressed his subjects: 'A new phase has just begun in the life of our beloved country. It is hard for us to recall the painful days that all of Tunisia has lived through.... before this decisive step in our national life, we must stand equal to our destiny in offering to the world the spectacle of a united people marching serenely towards progress. This great constructive effort to which we are summoned can only bear fruit for us through order, peace and security, which all the inhabitants of this country have the right to enjoy.' There was no doubt however that the balance of forces had shifted decisively away from the Bey. For France, the experience of the failed Mzali government highlighted the futility of hoping to evolve political institutions by means of negotiating only with the Bey. The new Resident General, Pierre Boyer de Latour was quick to understand this and it was now the Neo Destour who were the sole interlocutors for the Tunisian people.

Despite the repeated efforts of the Bey, a new government was formed without consulting the palace. To recover some semblance of his former influence, on 10 August he proposed to the French government that the institution of the beylicate should be replaced with a full monarchy, which would give him the authority he felt was appropriate. He was willing, in return, to sign supplementary agreements to the Treaty of Bardo necessary to maintain Franco-Tunisian cooperation and preserve the French presence in Tunisia. At the same time, he opened communications with Salah ben Youssef, in exile in Geneva. None of these approaches led to anything. After six months of negotiation, the autonomy accords were signed on 3 June 1955. Bourguiba had returned to Tunis on 1 June, welcomed as he came down the gangplank by the Bey's three sons, and by a giant demonstration of Tunisians. Having crossed the capital in triumph, Bourguiba visited the Bey in Carthage, apparently unmindful of having returned his decoration only a few months before, and made a stirring declaration of the deep attachment felt by the Tunisian people towards beylical rule. On 7 August the Bey applied his seal to the conventions agreed with France and on 1 September, for the first time since the protectorate was established in 1881, he applied his seal to decrees that had not been authorized by the Resident General. On 29 December 1955 his seal confirmed a decree establishing a Constituent Assembly for the country, with elections to be held on 8 April 1956. Tunisia appeared to be evolving into a constitutional monarchy.

In fact, power continued to ebb rapidly away from Lamine Bey as independence approached. Salah Ben Youssef returned from exile on 13 September 1955, giving the Bey hopes that his political power would start to be restored. He was close to Ben Youssef, who had been one of the few politicians to pay his respects to him at the time of his installation in 1943. However violence quickly erupted between followers of Ben Youssef and those of Bourguiba, leaving the Bey to vainly attempt to act as arbiter between them. The French had already transferred authority over the police force from the Resident General to the Tunisian government, whose ministers had been chosen by Bourguiba, so Ben Youssef's representations to the Bey had no effect. On 2 December the Bey summoned the Resident General (now known as the High Commissioner) Roger Seydoux to remind him of France's responsibility for public order—which in fact it no longer had. In effect, the Bey was appealing for a restoration of colonial powers from the nationalist government. As his appeals had no effect he made use of the only power remaining to him and refused to apply his seal to the decrees authorizing the forthcoming elections and the appointment of local governors and mayors. This move was welcomed by Ben Youssef, who demanded a ministerial reshuffle, but naturally alienated the Bey further from Bourguiba and his followers. He backed down and signed them the following day. Ben Youssef fled the country on 28 January and a crackdown followed on his followers in Tunisia, in which Bourguiba relied on the army, with its French officers, the airforce and heavy artillery. Horrified at this brutality, Lamine Bey renewed his ineffective protestations to Seydoux in April 1956. The only effect was to enrage Bourguiba, who hastened to the palace to accuse the Bey and his family of seeking to hinder the transfer of power from France to the Tunisian government. On 20 March 1956 the Franco-Tunisian protocol was signed by the Grand Vizier Tahar Ben Ammar and the French Foreign Minister Christian Pineau.

== King and deposition (1956–1957) ==
The French protectorate in Tunisia officially ended on 20 March 1956. On the same day, the Kingdom of Tunisia was proclaimed and the Bey was proclaimed King of Tunisia. His reign, however, was to be short-lived.

The 1956 Tunisian Constituent Assembly election saw a landslide victory for the National Union (an alliance between Neo Destour, the Tunisian General Labour Union, the National Union of Tunisian Farmers and the Tunisian Union of Craftsmen and Merchants) which won all 98 seats.

The Constituent Assembly held its formal opening ceremony on 8 April 1956. It was a sign of the changing times that the King presided over the session dressed in the uniform of a marshal of the Ottoman Empire, whose subject he had been when he was born, but which had ceased to exist in 1922. He expected to be present during the debates leading to the election of a speaker of the Assembly, and Prime Minister Tahar Ben Ammar had to intervene to persuade him to leave. The King withdrew with ill grace.

Two days later, Ben Ammar resigned and the King appointed Bourguiba as new Prime Minister.

On 31 May a decree from the Constituent Assembly abolished all privileges, exemptions and immunities which had previously been accorded to the ruling family. They were now simply ordinary citizens. Although this abruptly ended the civil list payments to members of his family and placed the crown estate under government control, the King signed the decree without protest. Another decree on 21 June modified the national emblems and removed any reference to the Husainid dynasty; another still, on 31 August, removed the King's prerogative to pass regulations, transferring this to the Prime Minister.

Further decrees followed, compelling the King to turn over various properties to the state, against the backdrop of a hostile press campaign highlighting the questionable, and perhaps even criminal, circumstances under which they had been acquired. These measures served to greatly reduce the remaining prestige of the King. Nonetheless Lamine Bey was the first person to be honoured, on 19 December 1956, with the decoration of the new Order of Independence (Tunisia). He reciprocated on the same day by awarding Bourguiba the Nichan Iftikhar (for the second time). Bourguiba clearly had little remaining respect for the ruling family however. On 19 July, at Eid al-Fitr he made a protocol visit with his ministers to the King's wife, but refused to approach the throne. 'I have not come here as I did before, but as head of the government. You should step forward to meet me and not remain seated in your throne,' he declared.

On 15 July 1957 the Tunisian army replaced the Royal Guard around the palace, and thereafter the King effectively lost his freedom of movement. On 18 July his younger son Salah Eddine was arrested on charges falsified by the police.

On 25 July 1957 the Constituent Assembly voted on a show of hands to abolish the monarchy, declare a Republic and make Bourguiba President.

Straight away, a delegation headed by deputy speaker Ali Belhouane Interior Minister Taïeb Mehiri and Justice Minister Ahmed Mestiri went to the palace of Carthage to make the King aware of the decree and ask him to leave the palace along with his wife, their three sons, seven daughters and grandchildren.

We went into the throne room right away, and without being announced, as we were already expected. Lamine Bey, wearing a jebba and with his hair undressed, stood there, dignified, without saying a word. Belhouane called out in his theatrical voice As-Salamou Alaikum and then read out the resolution of the Constituent Assembly. A photographer had come with us, and wanted to start working, but straight away the King broke his silence. Ah no, not that! he said, making a gesture of refusal, the last reflex of his authority. We did not want to deny the wishes of the old man, or humiliate him further. Then Ali Belhaouane made a gesture of salute with his hand, repeated As-Salamou Alaikum in his stentorian voice, and turned on his heels. As we withdrew, police commissioner Driss Guiga presented himself and advised the fallen ruler of an order from the Minister of the Interior placing him in isolation. In the course of this, hearing the name of his father spoken, the King reacted again, saying Allah Yarhamou (May God save his soul) clearly out loud as he left the room. It was over. The whole thing had not even lasted three minutes.

== Confinement and death ==
The 75-year-old Muhammad left his palace wearing a simple jebba of white linen and a pair of yellow Moroccan slippers, which he lost along the way. He was taken to the Hidaya palace in Manouba, an old abandoned beylical palace without water or electricity, which was assigned to him and several members of his family: his wife Lalla Djeneïna, their sons princes Chedly, M'hamed and Salah Eddine, princess Soufia, his son in law Muhammad Ben Salem and the Bey al-Mahalla Hassine Bey. The furniture of their new dwelling was no more than a mattress on the floor, with no sheets or covers. Food was provided for the first three days, after which the family was left to fend for itself.

Chedly and Ben Salem were transferred to the prison of Kairouan on 11 August. Hassine, M'hamed and princess Soufia were freed several days later. The last son, Salah Eddine, was transferred to the civil prison in Tunis three months after his house arrest. Alone in the ruined palace, the old couple were not allowed to leave until October 1958, as Lamine's health had deteriorated very badly. They were then transferred to a small villa in La Soukra with a kitchen, a bathroom and two other rooms and given a monthly allowance of 80 dinars, roughly the same as the salary of a secondary school teacher. They remained under house arrest and were forbidden even to go into the garden outside – indeed a policeman remained on duty actually inside the villa. Their daughter princess Soufia was allowed to visit them whenever she wished however. On 8 September the trial of Tahar Ben Ammar came to an end, having worked up the public mood with accusations made, and later withdrawn, about the who possessed the jewels which had belonged to the Bey's wife, which had still not been found.

Two years later, the search for the jewels was renewed and both the former King and his wife were summoned for interrogation. It may have been at this point that Salah Eddine, still confined in the civil prison of Tunis, was taken to his father, imprisoned in the same building, to say farewell to him. Summoned to the national security headquarters Lamine's wife was interrogated relentlessly for three days to the point where she could no longer speak and suffered an apoplexy as her son Salah Eddine recalled years later. 'As for mother, she never recovered from her arrest and most of all from the three days of interrogation on the fourth floor of the Ministry of the Interior, where the security forces questioned her endlessly about what happened to the family jewels. Whether she was maltreated or not, she came back with blood coming from her mouth and internal hemorrhages in her lower abdomen. She died later in my father's arms, still in shock, and without ever telling us what she had undergone during her interrogation.' Taken back to La Soukra in agony, she died two days later. She was buried in the cemetery of Sidi Abdelaziz in La Marsa, with her sons Salah Eddine and M'hamed present. Lamine was not allowed to leave his villa for the occasion. The public was also kept away from the burial by the police. Sidi Ali Ben Khodja, the Sheikh El Islam, was however allowed to enter the cemetery to pronounce the prayer for the dead.

Several days later, the former King's house arrest was lifted. Lamine was allowed to go out into his own garden, and to visit the tomb of his wife. He left the villa in La Soukra and moved into the apartment of a Jewish friend in the Rue de Yougoslavie, who had already taken in Ahmed El Kassar, husband of Princess Soufia as well as the family of Prince Salah Eddine when they were expelled from the palace. When Prince Chedly was freed in 1961, he joined them in Tunis in the Rue Fénelon in Lafayette, in a two-room apartment which was placed under constant surveillance.

Muhammad died on 30 September 1962 at the age of 81. He was buried in the cemetery of Sidi Abdelaziz next to his wife, unlike most rulers of his family who were interred in the mausoleum of Tourbet el Bey in the medina of Tunis. Sheikh Muhammad al-Tahir ibn Ashur said the prayers over his body and a single photographer, Victor Sebag, recorded the event, and was held overnight in a police cell for doing so. He was succeeded as head of the Husainid Dynasty and titular king by Husain Bey.

== Personal life ==
He married Lalla Jeneïna Beya in 1902, daughter of Bashir Ayari, a Tripolitanian merchant from the Ras Darb district of Tunis. He had twelve children, three princes and nine princesses:

- Princess Lalla Aïcha (1906–1994): The eldest daughter of the king, she represented her father on several occasions. She received Habib Bourguiba in the port of La Goulette on 1 June 1955, on the occasion of the country's internal independence. She married Slaheddine Meherzi. They had three sons.
- Princess Lalla Khadija (1909–199?): She married in 1939 Khaireddine Azzouz.
- Prince Chedly Bey (1910–2004): Former director of the Royal Cabinet (1950–1957) and Head of the Royal Family from 2001 to 2004. He married princess Hosn El Oujoud Zakkaria (?–1991).
- Princess Lalla Soufia (1912–1994): She initially married the prince Muhammad Hédi Bey (1907–1965) before they divorced, and later in 1943 she married the major general Hédi Ben Mustapha, later Chief of Protocol under the republic, (divorced), she married the lieutenant general Ahmed Kassar.
- Prince Mohammed Bey (1914–1999): He married a Circassian odalisque named Safiya (1910–2000), raised by Lalla Kmar (wife successively of Muhammad III as-Sadiq, Ali III ibn al-Husayn and Muhammad V an-Nasir). They had four sons and one daughter.
- Prince Salaheddine Bey (1919–2003): Founder of CS Hammam-Lif. He was arrested in August 1957 after the abolition of the monarchy. He married Habiba Meherzi (1916–199?) then Liliane Zid (1932–1998). He had two sons and two daughters by his first wife, and three sons and one daughter by the second.
- Princess Lalla Zeneïkha Zanoukha (1923–2007): She married in 1944 the colonel Nasreddine Zakaria. They had two sons and three daughters;
- Princess Lalla Fatma (1924–1957): Spouse of Mustapha Ben Abdallah, deputy Governor of Mateur. They had two sons and one daughter.
- Princess Lalla Kabira Kabboura (1926–2007): Spouse of the chief of protocol Muhammad Aziz Bahri. They had four sons and two daughters.
- Princess Lalla Zakia Zakoua (1927–1998): She married Muhammad Ben Salem in 1944, former minister of health. They had three sons and three daughters.
- Princess Lalla Lilia (1929–2021): She initially married Dr. Menchari (veterinarian), she married again in 1948 Hamadi Chelli. She went into voluntary exile in Morocco after the abolition of the monarchy in 1957. She returned to Tunisia after Zine El Abidine Ben Ali ascended to the presidency and was allowed to return from exile. She had two sons and one daughter.
- Princess Lalla Hédia (1931–2010): She married the engineer Osman Bahri. They had two sons and three daughters.

== Ancestry ==
Ancestors of Lamine Bey

8. Al-Husayn II bin Mahmud
4. Sidi Muhammad al-Mamun Bey
2. Muhammad VI al-Habib
9. Yasmine Ben Lamine
5. Lalla Fatima
1. Muhammad al-Amin
12. Sidi Ismail
6. Sidi Muhammad bin Ismail
3. Lalla Fatima bint Muhammad

== Bibliography ==
- Fayçal Bey (2001). La dernière odalisque : roman. Paris: Stock. ISBN 2-234-05346-3. OCLC 48837619.
- Ben Salem, Muhammad (1988). L'antichambre de l'indépendance. Tunis: Cérès Productions. ISBN 9973-700-00-7. OCLC 19348166.
- Borsali, Noura (2008). Bourguiba a l'epreuve de la democratie, 1956-1963. Tunis: Samed Editions. ISBN 978-9973-38-081-4. OCLC 233681804.
- Casemajor, Roger (2009). L'action nationaliste en Tunisie : du pacte fondamental de M'Hamed Bey à la mort de Moncef Bey 1857-1948. Hassine Raouf Hamza. Tunis: Sud Editions. ISBN 978-9938-01-006-0. OCLC 613024456.
- Chater, Kalifa (2010). Tahar Ben Ammar, 1889-1985. Tunis: Éditions Nirvana. ISBN 978-9973-855-20-6. OCLC 620103598.
- Eschadely, Halé (2014). De l'ombre vers la lumière : le combat du Docteur Salem Esch-Chadely. Tunis. ISBN 978-9973-944-38-2. OCLC 917231814.
- Juin, Maréchal (1959). Mémoires Alger Tunis Rome éd. Librairie Arthème Fayard. Nancy.
- Khlifi, Omar (2006). Moncef Bey roi martyr. [Tunisie]: MC-Editions. ISBN 978-9973-807-24-3. OCLC 949112603.
- Meredith, Martin (2006). The state of Africa : a history of fifty years of independence. New York: Free. ISBN 0-7432-3222-4. OCLC 62796384.
- Mestiri, Saïd. (1991). Le ministère Chenik à la poursuite de l'autonomie interne : de la déclaration de Thionville à l'exil de Kebili. Tunis: Arcs Editions. ISBN 9973-740-04-1. OCLC 30589215.
- Mistīrī, Aḥmad (2011). Témoignage pour l'histoire : des souvenirs, quelques réflexions et commentaires sur une époque contemporaine de la Tunisie, accessoirement du Maghreb (1940-1990) et sur la révolution de 2010-2011. Tunis. ISBN 978-9938-01-051-0. OCLC 846892054.
- Mons, Jean (1981). Sur les routes de l'histoire: cinquante ans au service de l'État. Paris: Albatros.
- Montgomery-Massingberd, Hugh (1980). Burke's Royal Families of the World: Africa & the Middle East. Burke's Peerage. ISBN 0-85011-029-7.
- Périllier, Louis (1979). La conquête de l'indépendance tunisienne : souvenirs et témoignages. Paris: R. Laffont. ISBN 2-221-00337-3. OCLC 6278593.
- Introduction à l'Afrique du nord contemporaine. Werner Ruf, Centre de recherches et d'études sur les sociétés méditerranéennes. Paris: C.N.R.S. 1975. ISBN 978-2-271-08124-7. OCLC 566050585.
- Sayah, Muhammad (1979). Tunis : Dar El Amal (ed.). Néo-Destour face à la troisième épreuve 1952-1956 (Le). 2, La Victoire / textes réunis et commentés par Muhammad Sayah [Histoire du mouvement national tunisien : documents.] Centre de Documentation Nationale.
- Silvera, Victor (1957). "Du régime beylical à la République tunisienne". Politique étrangère. 22 (5): 605. doi:10.3406/polit.1957.2477.
- Turkī, Bashīr (2011). Eclairage sur les recoins sombres de l'ère bourguibienne. Tunis. ISBN 978-9973-02-701-6. OCLC 823938881.

Lamine Bey Husainid dynasty Born: 4 September 1881 Died: 30 September 1962
Regnal titles
Preceded by Monsef Bey	Bey of Tunis; 1943–1956	Succeeded by Himself as King of Tunisia
Preceded by Himself as Bey of Tunis	King of Tunisia; 1956–1957	Succeeded by Habib Bourguiba as President of Tunisia (Monarchy abolished)
