= Prime Minister of Tunisia =

Head of government

Prime Minister of the Republic of Tunisia
- رئيس حكومة تونس
- Coat of arms of Tunisia

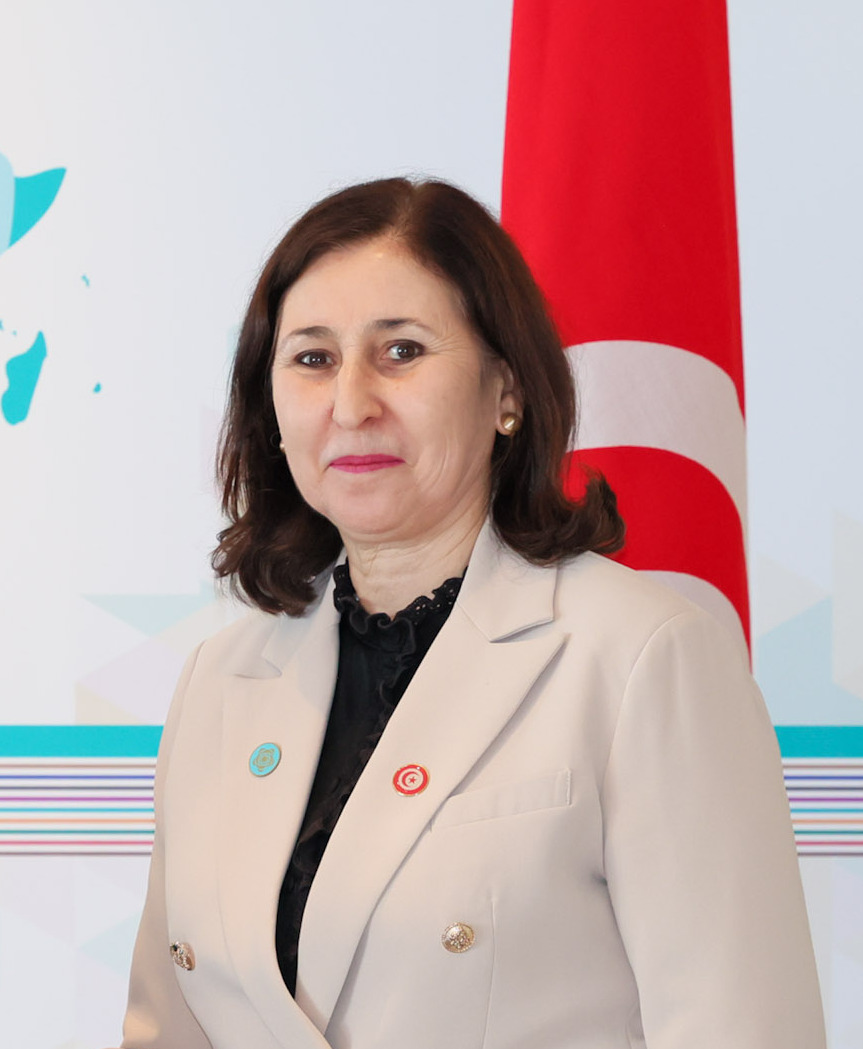
- Incumbent; Sara Zaafarani since 21 March 2025
- Cabinet of Tunisia
- Style: Prime Minister (informal); His/Her Excellency (formal, diplomatic)
- Type: Head of government (de jure)
- Status: Head of government
- Member of: Cabinet
- Reports to: President; Parliament
- Residence: Dar El Bey
- Appointer: President of Tunisia
- Term length: Variable
- Constituting instrument: Constitution of Tunisia
- Formation: 12 February 1759; 267 years ago
- First holder: Rejeb Khaznadar
- Salary: 8000TND monthly (US$ 2,867)
- Website: www.pm.gov.tn

The prime minister of Tunisia (Arabic: رئيس حكومة تونس, romanized: re’īs ḥukūmet Tūnis) is the head of the executive branch of the government of Tunisia. The prime minister directs the executive branch along with the president and, together with the prime minister's cabinet, is accountable to the Assembly of the Representatives of the People, to the prime minister's political party and, ultimately, to the electorate for the policies and actions of the executive and the legislature.

The office was established by Monarch Ali II with the appointment of Rejeb Khaznadar as the inaugural officeholder in 1759. The office was revived again in the republican system by Habib Bourguiba with the appointment of Bahi Ladgham in 1969. The constitution of 1959 established a presidential system where the president was both the head of state and the head of government. Bourguiba transferred some of his powers to the prime minister who had a ceremonial role. After the Tunisian Revolution in 2011, the prime minister was granted major attributions and shares the executive authority with the president. 2022 Tunisian constitutional referendum turned Tunisia into a presidential republic, giving the president sweeping powers while largely limiting the role of the parliament.

The president appoints a prime minister, the nominee of the winning party in the parliamentary election, the one that holds the largest number of seats in the assembly. The prime minister-designate has a month to form a cabinet and submit to parliament for a motion of confidence. If obtained, the cabinet is sworn in by the president. The prime minister and cabinet may be removed by vote of no confidence in the Assembly of People's Representatives.

47 people have held the office since 1759. The current prime minister has been Sara Zaafarani since 21 March 2025.

== History ==
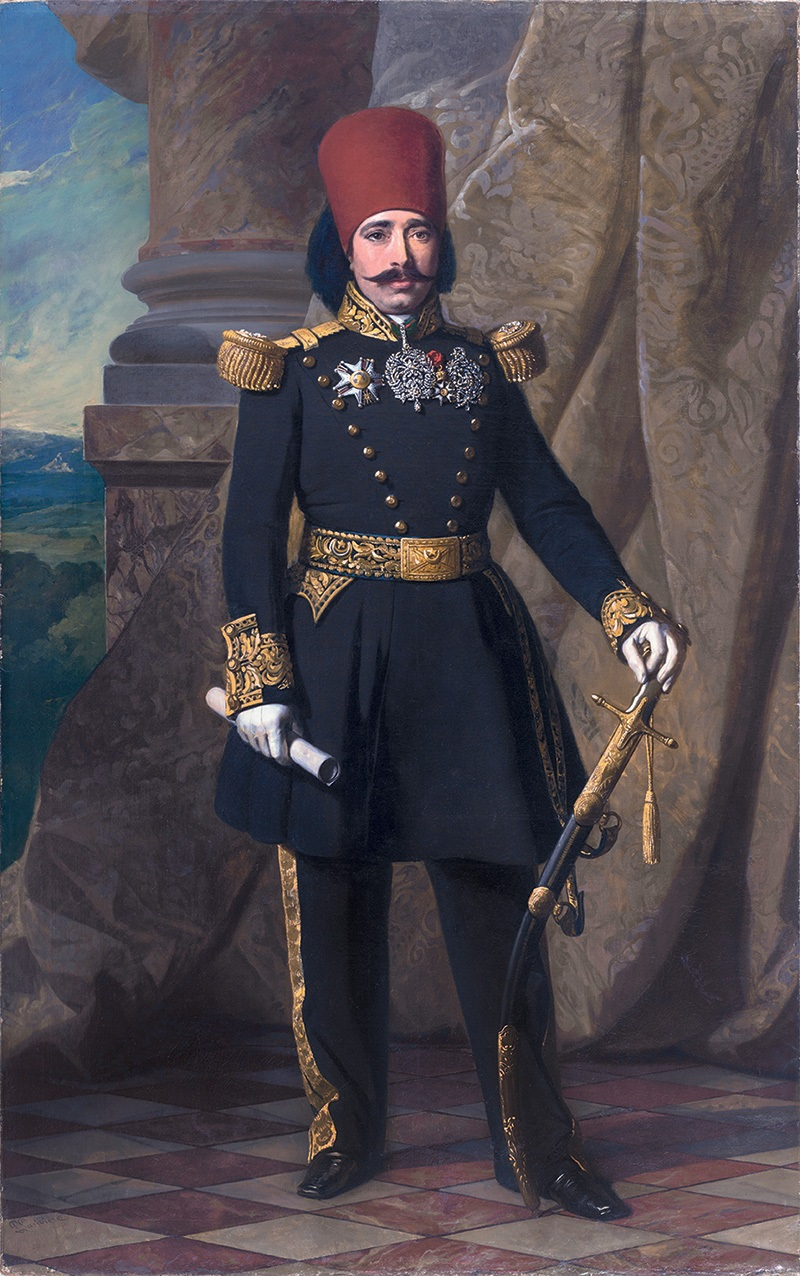
Mustapha Khaznadar, one of the most influential prime ministers in Tunisian history.

The Prime Minister during the era of the Tunisian monarchy is the head of the government who was responsible for its affairs and was appointed and dismissed by the Bey. This office was created in 1759 with the beginning of the rule of Ali II and Rejeb Khaznadar was the first to take it, becoming the first prime minister in the history of Tunisia.

With its creation, this office was the preserve of the Mamluks of foreign origin who were brought to Tunisia at a young age in order to serve the Royal Family and the Makhzen, such as Mustapha Khaznadar, Kheireddine Pacha and others.

Mohammed Aziz Bouattour is considered the first indigenous Tunisian to hold the office in 1882. He is the longest-serving prime minister in the history of Tunisia, with a period of nearly 25 years, and during his term, the French protectorate was established in Tunisia.

Throughout this period, the prime minister was not partisan because he was appointed by the monarch, in addition to the absence of parliamentary election until independence, when Habib Bourguiba became the first prime minister to be appointed through the 1956 election.

There were two exceptions related to Mohamed Chenik (1943 and 1950) and Tahar Ben Ammar in 1954 who were part of the Destour Party and were appointed by the Bey, and this caused a crisis, especially in 1943 because Muhammad VII Munsif did not coordinate with the French General Resident the appointment of the new prime minister, which caused a political crisis that led to his dismissal.

The office was abolished after Parliament abolished the monarchy, established a republic, and appointed Prime Minister Bourguiba as the first president of the Republic of Tunisia. The office was not occupied until 1969 after the system was revised from presidential to semi-presidential.

== Appointment ==
After the election, the president nominate the candidate of the party which gained the most votes to form a government within a month. The nominee must submit its program to the Assembly of the Representatives of the People and get the trust of the majority of its members before being formally appointed prime minister by the president. If it fails to form a government or if it does not get the confidence, the president initiates consultations with the political parties to find the best candidate. If four months after the election, the Assembly did not give confidence in the prime minister, the president can call a new election.

The prime minister swears to the following oath in the presence of the president:

I swear by Almighty God to work faithfully for the good of Tunisia, to respect its Constitution and laws, scrupulously to their interests and serve loyally.

== Constitutional powers ==
The powers of the prime minister are established by the current Constitution of Tunisia of 2014. The prime minister is primarily responsible for domestic policy, while foreign policy, defense and domestic security are handled by the president.

The prime minister is responsible for:

- Creating, amending and dissolving ministries (Except ministries of Defence and Foreign Affairs which require the president's approval).
- Creating, amending and dissolving public institutions, public entities and administrative departments.
- Issuing governmental decrees after consulting the Council of Ministers.
- Shall endorse and sign, where appropriate, regulatory orders issued by ministers.
- Request the parliament to give vote of confidence to their government.

The prime minister, together with the president, represent Tunisia at home and abroad.

In the event the president is temporarily unable to carry out his duties, the prime minister serves as Acting President for a maximum of 60 days. If the disability is permanent or the result of the president's resignation or death, the president of the Assembly of the Representatives of the People becomes interim president for a period of 45 to 90 days pending new elections.

== See also ==
- Tunisia
  - List of Beys of Tunis
  - List of French residents-general in Tunisia
  - List of prime ministers of Tunisia
  - President of Tunisia
    - List of presidents of Tunisia
    - First Lady of Tunisia
- Lists of office-holders
- List of current heads of state and government
