= Makhzen (Algeria) =

Governing institution in Algeria

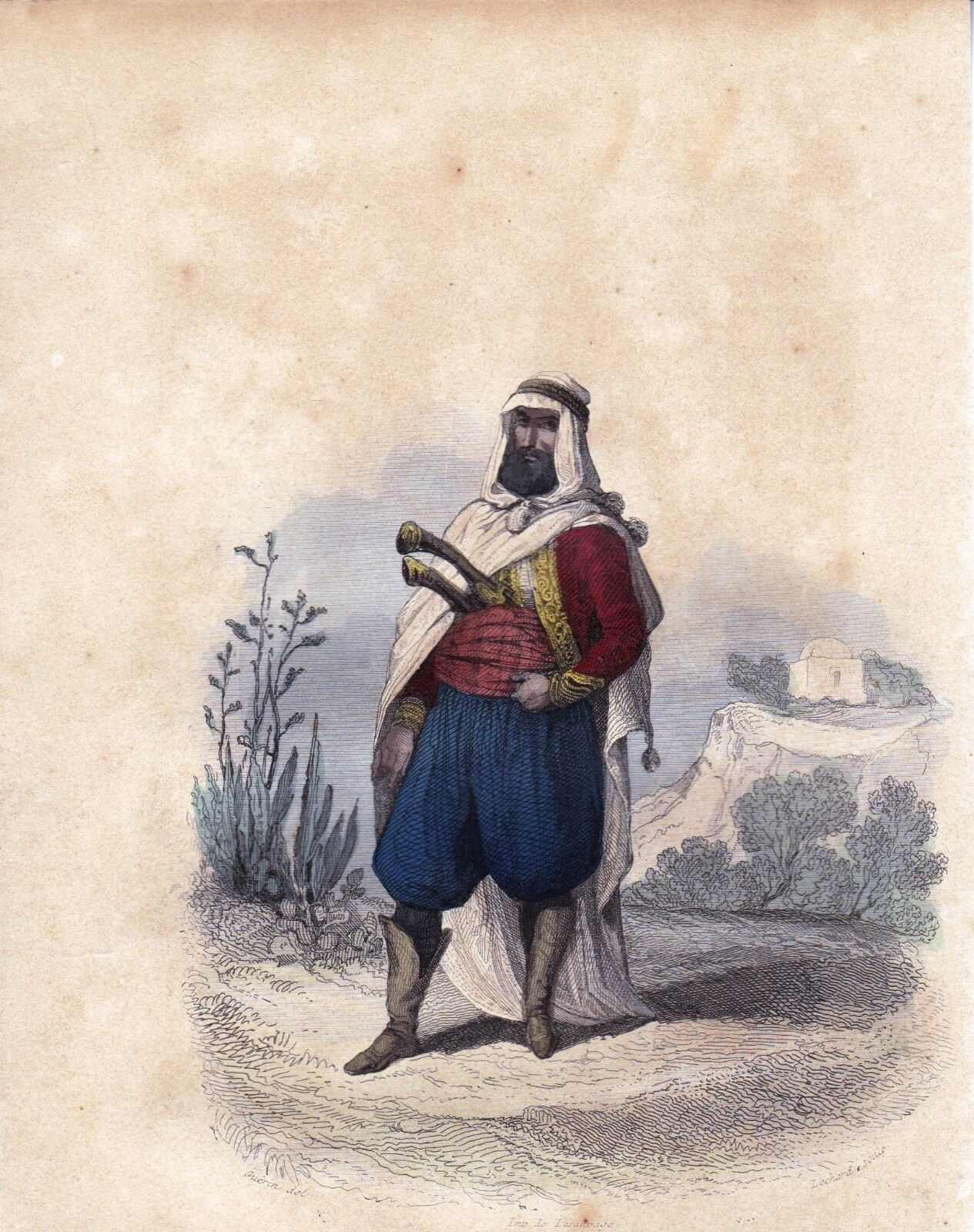
19th-century color engraving of a Kabyle chief

The makhzen (Arabic: مخزن) refers in Algeria to a doctrine of power and to the designation of a mode of state administration in force particularly during the period of the Regency of Algiers. It corresponds to a form of management of the link between tribe and central State in the Maghreb prefigured in its central part since the Fatimid era and developing particularly under the Zyyanides.

The origin of the “makhzen system” lies in the weakening of the Hafsid, Marinid and Zayyanid states towards the end of the Middle Ages linked to Spanish pressure in Andalusia and on the Maghreb coast, the Ottoman advance, and internal struggles. These dynasties called on the Hilalian Bedouin tribes to retain a minimum of power and delegated control of part of their territory to them. This is the iqta system: the tribes collect taxes, which they pay in part to their sovereign, to whom they also owe military service. This system, developed un these three dynasties, already existed under the Fatimids, and was particularly used by the Zayyanid dynasty, the Regency of Algiers, and during the colonial period.

The makhzen tribes were socially classified within the rural population of the Eyalet of Algiers, as they were strong supporters of the Ottoman Algerian administration in the countryside, where they were looking for strong local support that would enhance its influence and presence, and from the same rural community targeted in order to cover up the numerical weakness of the Ottomans who were confined to the main cities of the regency. the Historian Ahmed Tewfik El Madani (1899–1983) wrote:

The Ottomans were not colonizers since they were not land owners, The truth is that the Ottoman legitmacy was dependent on the one hand on the Algerian tribesmen, and on the other hand it was dependent on the Islamic unity represented by the Ottoman caliphate. And all power, under the direction of the Pasha and the Beys, was in the hands of the Algerian sheikhs, east and west, plain and mountain

The makhzen tribes played multiple important roles, whether in terms of military or economic support, for the benefit of the Ottoman administration in Algeria, in addition to imposing public order and the authority of the beylikson the population. They also became administratively framed by the Ottoman authority and enjoyed many privileges that ensured their loyalty.

== Recruitment ==
The makhzen tribes played an important role in the administrative aspect in service of the Ottoman Algerian authority, as they provided the agents charged with collecting taxes, counting the population and managing its affairs, the position of leader or a sheikh could give a hold on several numbers of makhzen tribes. The most notable of the sheikhs was the Kabyle leader Mohamed ben Zamoum.

Due to the importance and role of the makhzen tribes in expanding the control of the central authority, their presence and recruitment was throughout all parts of the regency, Georges Voisin referred to the formation and recruitment of these tribes in the vicinity of the capitals of the Beyliks, he wrote:

The beys summon men who have the willingness and will to cooperate with the Ottoman authority, as these come accompanied with their tents, families and herds, and those who do not own them are provided with horses and weapons, and they also cut lands for plowing and exploitation with the privilege of not paying taxes, These summons are addressed by the beys to the strongest tribes from a military point of view in particular.

and the situation of the Makhzen tribes developed until they became one of the organs of the Ottoman regime in Algeria, especially in its last stages, and the power of administration depended on the extent of its association with the Makhzen tribes.

== Military importance ==
The military importance of the makhzen tribes was evident in the fact that the Ottoman Algerians did not have regular cavalry, so they recruited only from the makhzen tribes. Saidouni also indicates that the Janissaries usually numbered less than 4,000, whilst the makhzen tribes enrolled 30,000 men in the countryside and cities, which went down to 15,000 in times of peace, in addition to the reserves that could be used in times of need such as wars and disciplinary campaigns to suppress rebellions. Their military importance also emerged in the western beylik in particular, the massive use of the makhzen tribes was due to the presence of imminent dangers represented essentially in Spanish Oran and the Sherifian Empire. In Mascara they formed the main body of the armies against the Spaniards in Oran and some of their allies, like the Banu Amer tribe. Al-Zamul and the Dway'ir were counted among the best of the makhzen knights, located mainly in the Orania region.

== Economical importance ==
As for the economic aspect, Saidouni points out that agriculture flourished during the era of the Beylerbayat (1518–1588) and the Pashas (1659–1588), which meant economic prosperity in the rural agricultural areas, which was a target for the control of the Ottoman Algerian administration through its working machine in the countryside, the makhzen tribes, which were in turn an attractive tax source for the authority, especially starting from the era of the pashas, and controlled production and obtaining in-kind and financial demands, because taxes imposed on agricultural properties and agricultural and animal production in the countryside represented a major financial resource for the Ottoman Algerian administration.

The imposed taxes and tithes were usually unfair and had no legal basis. Rather, they were determined by the officers of the locality and the knights of the makhzen.

Etymologically, makhzen means "store" or "tax", and by extension the entire state apparatus of the Regency of Algiers. Originally, it applied more precisely to the large coffers where tax revenues were deposited, then extended to everything that the central power could acquire with its own funds (palace, army, etc.); then to the tribes, who, from territory granted to them, rendered service to the power in place. It was in the division of society into tribes that some were called makhzen. Those tribes were privileged: they provided troops to the Regency, and were responsible for maintaining order and collecting taxes. The concept of makhzen tribe was opposed to that of raya tribes, taxable and subject. Later, Emir Abd el Kader removed the distinction between makhzen and raya tribes in order to unify his domain. Regarding the name of the government in Algeria, the Turkish word (beylik) replaced the old Arabic word (makhzen). This designated only the riders of the beylik.

== French Algeria ==
In colonial Algeria, from the 19th century, the makhzen constituted a mode of political domination attractive to the French who, in the continuity of the Regency, even reconstituted their old makhzen for a time. This “colonial makhzen” allows Arab offices to lay the foundations of a hierarchy of command, to have relays throughout the territory. In addition to the dignitaries recruited from the tribes (aghas, khalifas, caids, etc.), it made it possible to form a body of indigenous officials made up of subordinate groups. Thus, the khodja are responsible for correspondence in Arabic, the chaouchs take care of police and intelligence, the khiela and spahis who constitute a paid cavalry and the askars and goums form a troop reserve that can be mobilized at the request of the central power, as from the time of the regency of Algiers. The term makhzen gives the word mokhazni designating a body of auxiliaries of the colonial troops.

== Makhzen and contemporary politics ==
In the administration of independent Algeria, as in other Arab states, a bureaucratic culture tends to replace a patrimonial culture. The monopoly of the administrative apparatus by a politicized elite competes with the traditional model of the makhzen. The contemporary Arab State thus finds itself between two archetypes, that of the Makhzen State whose conditions no longer exist and that of the administrative State whose conditions are not yet completely in place.

The relationship between tribes and successive political powers allows us to understand and evaluate the role of the tribal structure in the context of contemporary Maghreb states.

== See also ==
- Makhzen (Tunisia)
- Makhzen (Morocco)
