= Albert Bessis =

Tunisian politician (1885–1972)

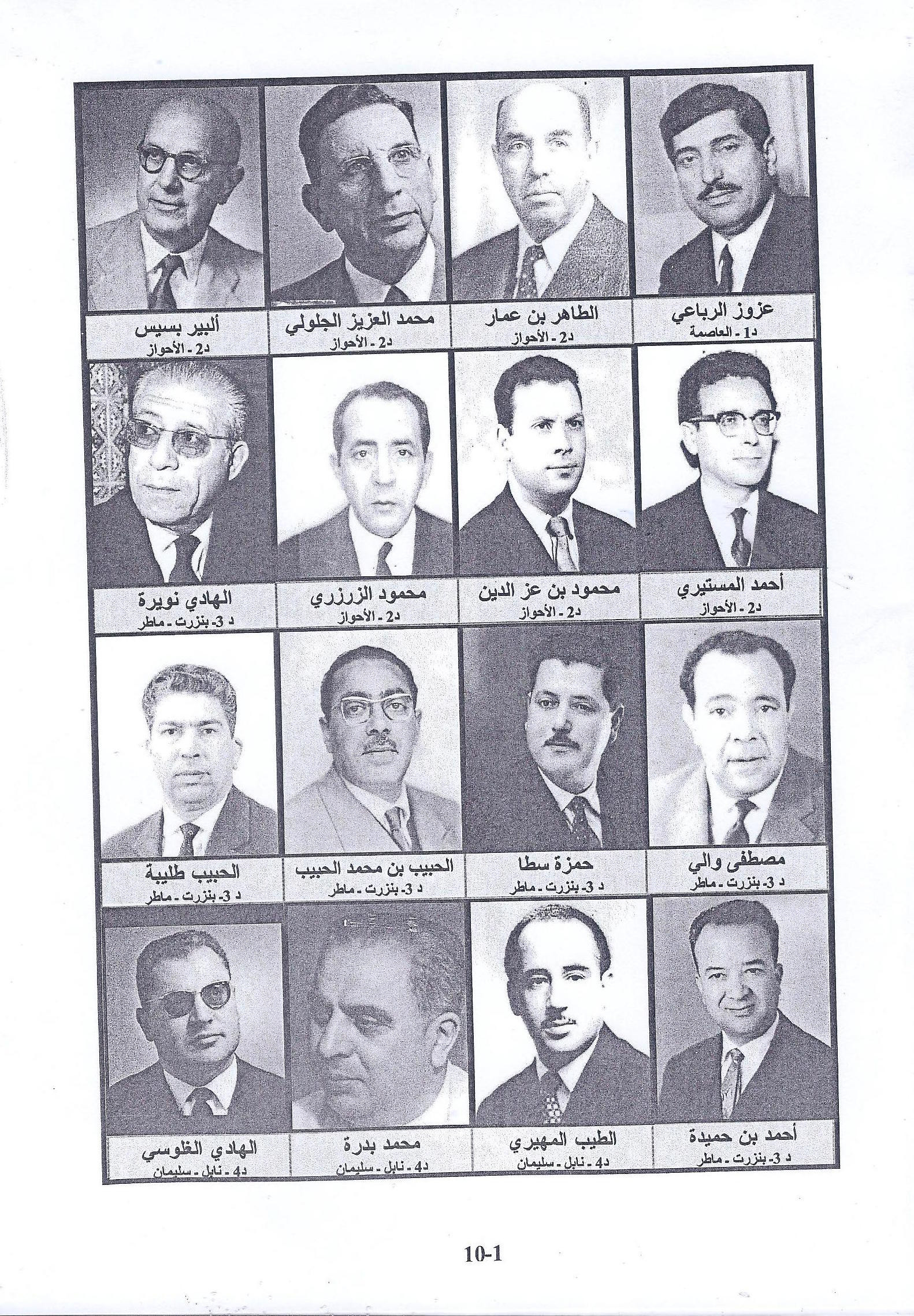
Albert Bessis (top left) listed among members of the 1956 Tunisian Constituent Assembly.

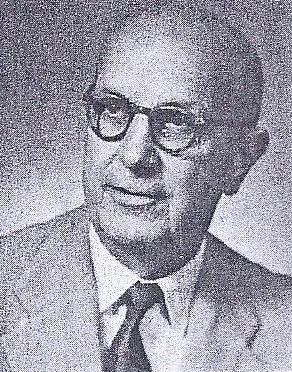
Portrait of Albert Bessis.

Albert Bessis (Arabic: ألبير بسيس) (1972–1885) was a Tunisian politician. He directed urban planning and housing for the country after its independence and also served as a member of its parliament until 1969.
