= Hachemi Baccouche =

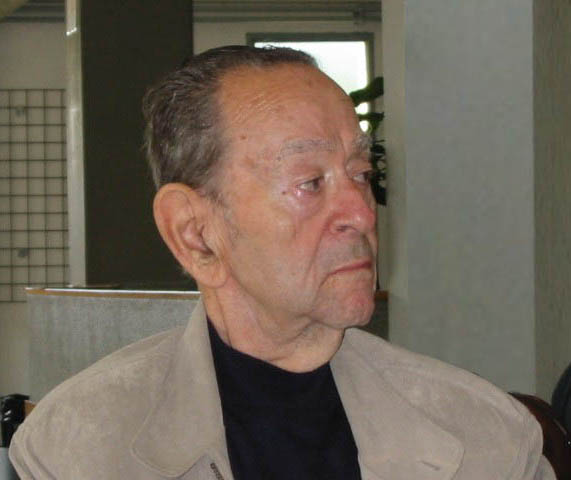
Mhamed Hachemi Baccouche

Mhamed Hachemi Baccouche, known as Hachemi Baccouche (Arabic: هاشمي بكوش), (Tunis, January 4, 1916 – Tunis, June 9, 2008) was a Tunisian writer, humanist, and psychosociologist. The nephew of former prime minister Slaheddine Baccouche, he was exiled in France from 1957 to 2000, but returned to Tunis in 2006. He was a communist in his youth.
