= Aziza Baccouche =

American physicist and science filmmaker (1976–2021)

- Born: November 25, 1972
- Died: June 11, 2021 (aged 48)
- Education: College of William & Mary (BSc, 1995); Hampton University (MSc, 1998); University of Maryland, College Park (PhD, 2002)
- Employers: CNN; AZIZA Productions
- Website: http://www.draziza.com/

Zohra Aziza Baccouche (November 25, 1972 – June 11, 2021) was an American physicist and science filmmaker. She was an American Association for the Advancement of Science Mass Media Science and Engineering fellow at CNN and founder and CEO of media company Aziza Productions. Baccouche lost her sight due to a brain tumor at eight years old.

== Early life ==
Baccouche was born to an African-American mother and Tunisian father on November 25, 1972 and brought up in Tunisia. She developed a brain tumor as a child, which caused a disorder called hydrocephalus when she was eight years old. Hydrocephalus blocks cerebral fluid in the brain and creates pressure within the ventricles. In Baccouche's case, that pressure damaged her optic nerve causing her to lose all but 9% of her vision by the age of eight.

== Education ==
Baccouche was the first blind person to study physics at the College of William & Mary, graduating in 1995 with a Bachelor of Science. Her undergraduate advisor suggested that because she was blind, she should not study physics. Baccouche earned her master's degree from Hampton University in 1998 and her PhD in theoretical nuclear physics from the University of Maryland, College Park, in 2002. Her dissertation entitled "Phenomenology of Isoscalar Heavy Baryons" focused on heavy baryons. She attended a private elementary school in Tunis named Jeanne D’Arc. The school was not equipped to teach visually impaired students. In the 6th grade a national exam that all elementary students had to pass in order to go on to secondary school would be administered at the end of the school year. Her school administrators were very concerned about her ability to pass the exam given her visual constraints. So a decision was made for me to enroll in the only elementary school for the blind in Tunis. She reluctantly transitioned to Bir El Kasaa. A few days before the beginning of her secondary school year, she started at her new school for the blind in Sousse, Tunisia. This was a boarding school like the one in Bir El Kasaa. There were no opportunities for extracurricular activities at the school. While many students were musically inclined, there were no instruments and no music returning to the United States instruction. She studied in Sousse for one year before her family returned to the United States.

== Career ==
As part of an American Association for the Advancement of Science Mass Media Fellowship in 1998, Baccouche joined CNN in Atlanta and was appointed the special science correspondent of the Washington Bureau. In 2000, she established Aziza Productions , a media production company that works with nonprofit organizations to make films that raise awareness about Black or disabled scientists. Baccouche would later preview the show Hanging With Dr. Z at a festival sponsored by the American Association for the Advancement of Science.

After completing her PhD, Baccouche continued her career in science communication. In addition to continuing to work at Aziza Productions, she became a science correspondent for Evening Exchange with Kojo Nnamdi on Howard University Television. Baccouche was involved with initiatives to increase the number of African-American women studying physics. She worked as a science media producer and was a frequent contributor to the National Society of Black Physicists (NSBP) conferences. In 2020 Baccouche authored a memoir titled "Seeking Vision," chronicling her life from when she was declared legally blind at the age of eight until her fifth brain surgery.

Shortly thereafter, she was in hospice for almost a week and lost her ability to speak and move. She developed dementia and died from complications from her brain tumor on June 11, 2021.

== Awards and distinctions ==
Baccouche received a HerStory Award at the Women's Federation for World Peace USA National Assembly in 2013.
