= Salah ben Youssef =

Tunisian politician

Salah Ben Youssef صالح بن يوسف
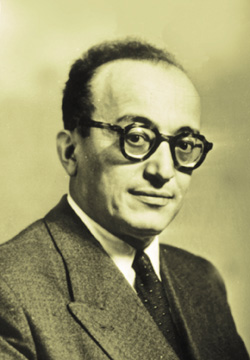
- Salah ben Youssef

Tunisian Minister of Justice
- In office 1950–1952
- Monarch: Lamine Bey
- Prime Minister: Mohamed Chenik
- Preceded by: Mohamed Abdelaziz Djaït

Secretary General of Neo Destour
- In office October 17, 1948 – October 8, 1955
- Preceded by: Habib Bourguiba
- Succeeded by: Bahi Ladgham

Personal details
- Born: October 11, 1907 Maghraoua, Djerba, French Tunisia
- Died: August 12, 1961 (aged 53) Frankfurt, West Germany
- Manner of death: Assassination
- Resting place: Djellaz Cemetery, Tunis
- Party: Neo Destour
- Profession: Lawyer

Salah Ben Youssef (Arabic: صالح بن يوسف, romanized: Ṣalāḥ ibn Yūsuf; October 11, 1907 – August 12, 1961) was a Tunisian politician and one of the key leaders of the Tunisian national movement.

== Early life and advocacy of independence ==
Born in Maghraoua, a small village near Midoun on Djerba, to a family of wealthy and influential merchants. He trained to be a lawyer, but became involved in politics where he was prized for his personal qualities. This would later lead to his ascension to being Habib Bourguiba's protégé.

He began his political career as the Secretary General of the Neo-Destour Political Party, a post where he played a role of key organizer during Bourguiba's exile. In August 1950, he was appointed as the Tunisian Minister of Justice in the government of Mohamed Chenik. Charged with bringing the Tunisian request for statehood to the United Nations, which was gathered in Paris in March 1952, he barely escaped arrest and deportation. He then traveled across the world for more than three years, during which he was received by Gamal Abdel Nasser, President of Egypt, Jawaharlal Nehru, Prime Minister of India, and Zhou Enlai, Premier of the People's Republic of China. Meanwhile, Bourguiba signed agreements with France on 3 June 1955 establishing internal autonomy for Tunisia.

== Confrontation with Bourguiba ==
Ben Youssef deplored the autonomy agreements, which took place without him, as "a step backwards and a setback". In his view, the wholesale evacuation of French Troops from the entirety of Tunisian territory was an indisputable prerequisite for genuine national independence.

Whereas Ben Youssef was previously a loyal friend of Bourguiba, when he returned to the country on June 1, 1955, he became Bourguiba's arch-enemy. According to Ben Youssef, his adversary was capable of practicing a "policy of denial and betrayal" of the Tunisian People and concerning the Algerian War. Having returned to Tunisia from Cairo on September 13, he began to organize unrest throughout the country.

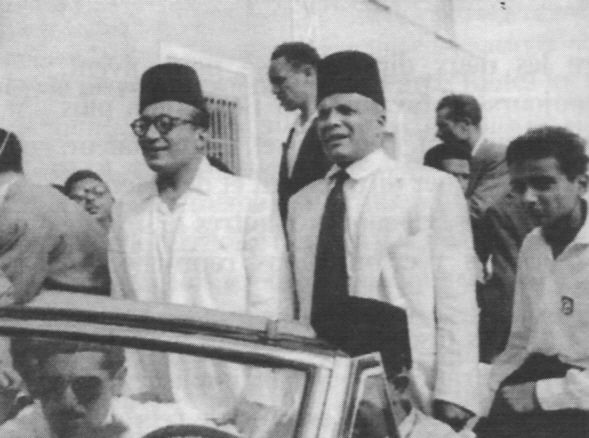
Arrival of Salah Ben Youssef to Tunis September 13, 1955.

Those aligned with Bourguiba, the "Bourguibists", and those aligned with Ben Youssef, the Youssefists, began to have numerous meetings to denounce and strike down the position of the opposing party. Convened on October 8, under Bourguiba's leadership, the Neo-Destour caucus decided to open session and thereupon demand that Ben Youssef be expelled from the party. Stripped of his roles and excluded from the party following the congress convened from November 15 to 19, Ben Youssef continued to campaign in the south of Tunisia where he organized a number of gatherings up to the end of November which resulted in clashes with Bourguiba supporters. He remained committed to his activism up until January 1958.

== Exile and assassination ==
On two occasions, in January 1957 and in November 1958, Ben Youssef was sentenced to death. However, he was able to escape on January 28, allowing him to avoid the realization of those sentences. Pursued, he fled to Tripoli, Libya and then to Cairo, Egypt where he was able to take advantage of a temporary estrangement between Bourguiba and Nasser. However, soon his presence became bothersome. He went to Zurich, Switzerland where he received Bourguiba one last time on March 3, 1961. Realizing that the relationship between Bourguiba and himself would forever be intractable, Ben Youssef, who was afflicted by eczema on his legs, took up residence in a hotel in Wiesbaden, West Germany on June 2, 1961, in order to use the local thermal baths. On August 12, he was assassinated in a Frankfurt hotel by two accomplices.

Some published sources advance the argument that the leaders of the conspiracy to eliminate Ben Youssef were Bourguiba himself, his wife Wassila Ben Ammar, Mohamed Masmoudi, Hassen Belkhodja, Taïeb Mhiri and Béchir Zarg Layoun. The Minister of the Interior Mehiri would have requested the use of two persons that Zarg Layoun had just recruited to see the plan through. After the work of The Truth and Dignity Commission, the Criminal Chamber specialized in transitional justice cases in the First Instance Court of Tunis began its work on May 16, 2019, with the following as accused: The Presidency of the Republic, the Presidential Guard, the Ministry of the Interior, the Ministry of Foreign Affairs, the Embassy of Tunisia in Germany, Germany, Habib Bourguiba, Bashir Zarg Layoun, Hsan Ben Abdelaziz Ouerdeni, Abdallah Ben Mabrouk Ouardeni, Mohamed Ben Khalifa Mehrez and Hmida Ben Tarbout. Noted that the case is classified because of the death of Habib Bourguiba, Bashir Zarg El Ayoun and Hsan Ouerdeni. For Abdallah Ouardeni and Khalifa Mehrez; They remain not found. Hmida Ben Tarbout was auditioned by the commission. The plan consisted of making Ben Youssef believe that these were officers of the Tunisian Armed Forces who wanted to see him in order to inform him of and request his presence in a Tunisian coup d'état.

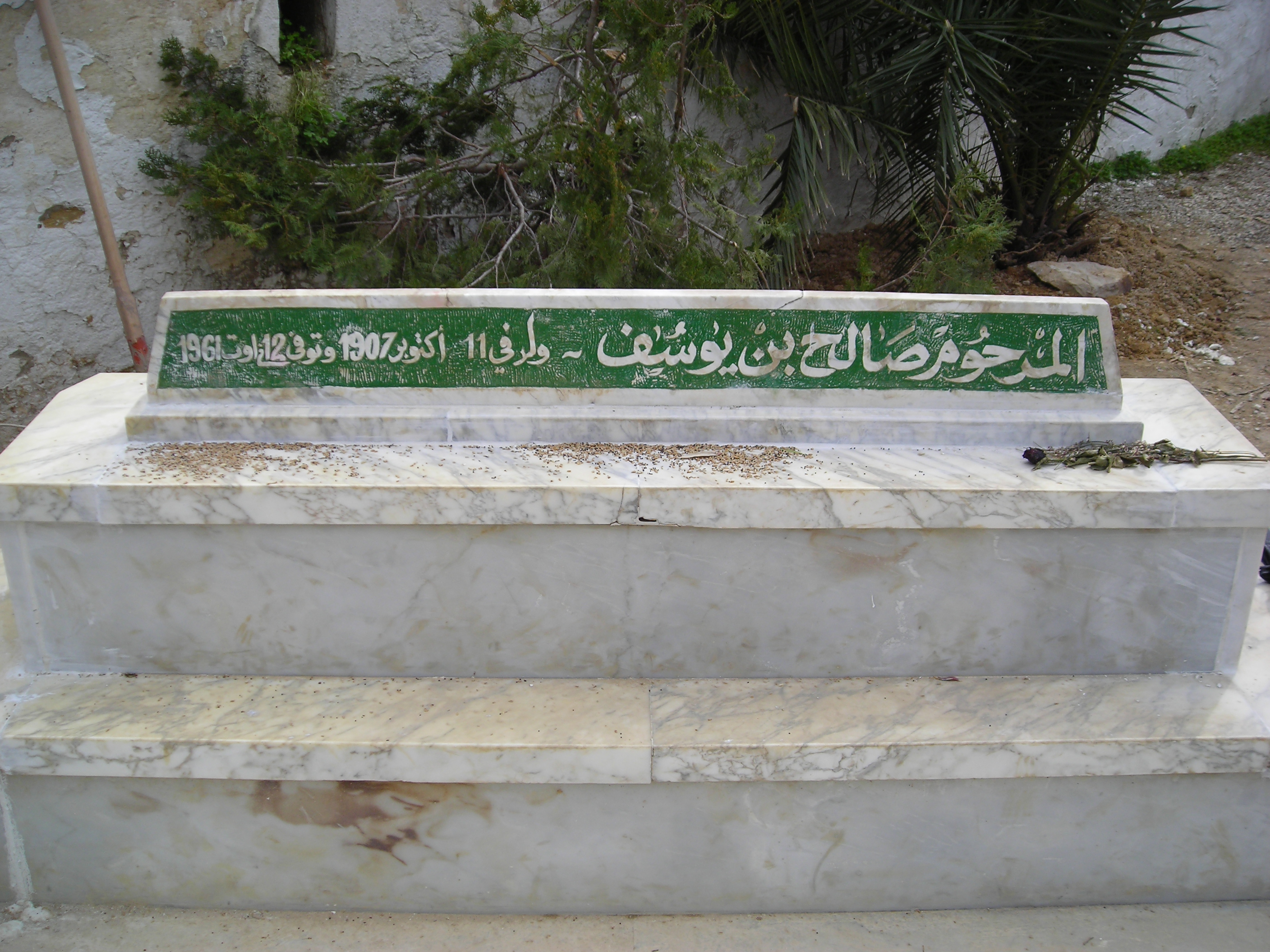
Tomb of Salah Ben Youssef

Less than twenty days after the conclusion of the Bizerte crisis and basking in patriotic fervour of the Tunisian people, Bourguiba judged that the moment had come to remove his principal political rival. Once Ben Youssef arrived in Frankfurt, he left his wife Soufia in a café on the Kaiserstrasse and went towards the Hotel Royal, situated on the same street. It was there that the two henchmen met him and brought him with them to their room to go over the plan for the coup d'état. One of them shot him at close range around 16:30. It was only three hours later that Soufia discovered her husband bathing comatose in his blood. He was taken to the University Hospital Frankfurt where he died around 22:45 without ever regaining consciousness

=== Afterwards ===
He was sent back to Cairo and entombed there, but his remains were later repatriated to Tunisia and re-interred in the Martyr's Square at Jellaz Cemetery. His widow Soufia only returned to Tunisia on December 22, 1987, after more than thirty years of exile in Cairo. She was received on January 2, 1988, by the President of Tunisia Zine el-Abidine Ben Ali. She died in 2016. His granddaughter, Leila Ben Youssef, is an athlete who performs pole vaulting.

In April 2012, Al Jazeera Documentary Channel put out a film produced by the Tunisian Jamel Dallali about Ben Youssef's life, titled Salah Ben Youssef, un crime d'État (which translates to "Salah Ben Youssef, a Crime of the State").

== Bibliography ==
- Omar Khlifi, L'assassinat de Salah Ben Youssef, éd. MC-Editions, Carthage, 2005. ISBN 9973807480.
