= Mohamed Chenik =

Tunisian politician and businessman

M'hamed Chenik
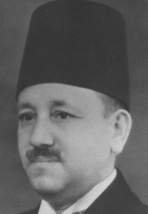

Prime Minister of Tunisia
- In office 1 January 1943 – 15 May 1943
- Monarch: Muhammad VII
- Preceded by: Hédi Lakhoua
- Succeeded by: Slaheddine Baccouche
- In office 17 August 1950 – 26 March 1952
- Monarch: Muhammad VIII
- Preceded by: Mustapha Kaak
- Succeeded by: Slaheddine Baccouche

Personal details
- Born: 1 May 1889 Tunis, French Tunisia
- Died: 20 November 1976 (aged 87) Radès, Tunisia
- Party: Destour
- Spouse: Essia Chelbi

Mohamed Chenik also known as M'hamed Chenik (محمد شنيق) (Tunis, May 1889 – Radès, November 20, 1976) was a Tunisian politician and businessman. He served as Prime Minister of Tunisia twice, in 1943 under Muhammad VII al-Munsif, and again from 1950 until 1952 under Muhammad VIII al-Amin.

== Biography ==
Born in May 1889 in Tunis to a bourgeois family, he studied at Sadiki College that he left after the brutal death of his father. Thanks to his paternal friend Abdeljelil Zaouche, he worked in his flour mill and obtained a diploma as a chartered accountant, which opened the doors of the Tunisian Trade Union, the first specifically Tunisian economic organization, founded by Djerbian traders in 1912 on the initiative of Zaouche. It is within this company that he gradually climbs the ladder: from simple accountant, he eventually became co-director in 1917. The young Chenik reveals a manager "serious and competent" and quickly acquires the esteem and the trust of its agents. Thus, in 1919, he was sent to Europe, visited Germany and France, and moved to Marseille, where he sold Tunisian products and bought colonial products; he was particularly familiar with import-export problems and stock market transactions.

It was during his stay in France that he met Abdelaziz Thâalbi in July 1919 at the Hotel de la Marne in Marseille. The latter informed him of the constitution of a new party, the Destour. Wrapped up by the news and convinced by the 18 demands of the party, Chenik adhered to it with the sponsorship of Thâalbi.

In 1922, he created the first specifically Tunisian bank with the assistance of a group of Tunisian traders, the Tunisian Credit Cooperative, of which he became the administrator until 1936. At that time, Tunisia only housed institutions of French, English and Italian banking.

In 1935, when the Tunisian economy was in great difficulty because of the fallout of the world economic crisis of the 1930s, Chenik undertook the construction of a modern economic network, along with the protectorate network, in a long-term strategy aimed at acquiring the economic emancipation of Tunisia in relation to France. For this, he organized a trip to Egypt, Syria, Palestine and Lebanon, aiming at the reopening of the Middle Eastern market which was the first trading partner of Tunisia before the protectorate. During his stay in Egypt, he met Talaat Harb, considered as the founding father of the Egyptian economy, who made him visit his main factories including Mehala Kubra (large center of spinning and weaving). In 1939, Chenik founded the second Tunisian factory, the Tunisian spinning and weaving company (STUFIT), which he headed until his death.

Chenik was also a farmer: he started very early in this field in the early 1920s. He was also one of the first Tunisian farmers to introduce the agricultural machine. Beginner with a simple plot, he quickly found himself at the head of more than a thousand hectares and a large livestock. He also remained active in this branch until his death.
