= Lotfi Baccouche =

Tunisian footballer

Personal information
- Date of birth: 19 June 1973
- Place of birth: Zaouiet Sousse, Tunisia
- Date of death: 15 May 1999 (aged 25)
- Place of death: Zaouiet Sousse, Tunisia

International career
| Years | Team | Apps | (Gls) |
- Tunisia

Lotfi Baccouche (19 June 1973 – 15 May 1999) was a Tunisian footballer. He competed in the men's tournament at the 1996 Summer Olympics.
