= Slaheddine Baccouche =

Tunisian politician

- صلاح الدين البكوش

Prime minister of Tunisia
- In office 15 May 1943 – 19 July 1947
- Monarch: Muhammad VIII
- Preceded by: Mohamed Chenik
- Succeeded by: Mustapha Kaak
- In office 26 March 1952 – 2 March 1953
- Monarch: Muhammad VIII
- Preceded by: Mohamed Chenik
- Succeeded by: Mohamed Salah Mzali

Personal details
- Born: 14 August 1883 Tunis, French Tunisia
- Died: 24 December 1959 (aged 76) Tunis, Tunisia
- Spouse: Amina Ben Ayed

Slaheddine Baccouche (August 14, 1883 – December 24, 1959) was a Tunisian politician. He served as Prime Minister of Tunisia under Muhammad VIII al-Amin, from 1943 to 1947 and again from 1952 to 1954. His nephew was the writer Hachemi Baccouche.

== Biography ==
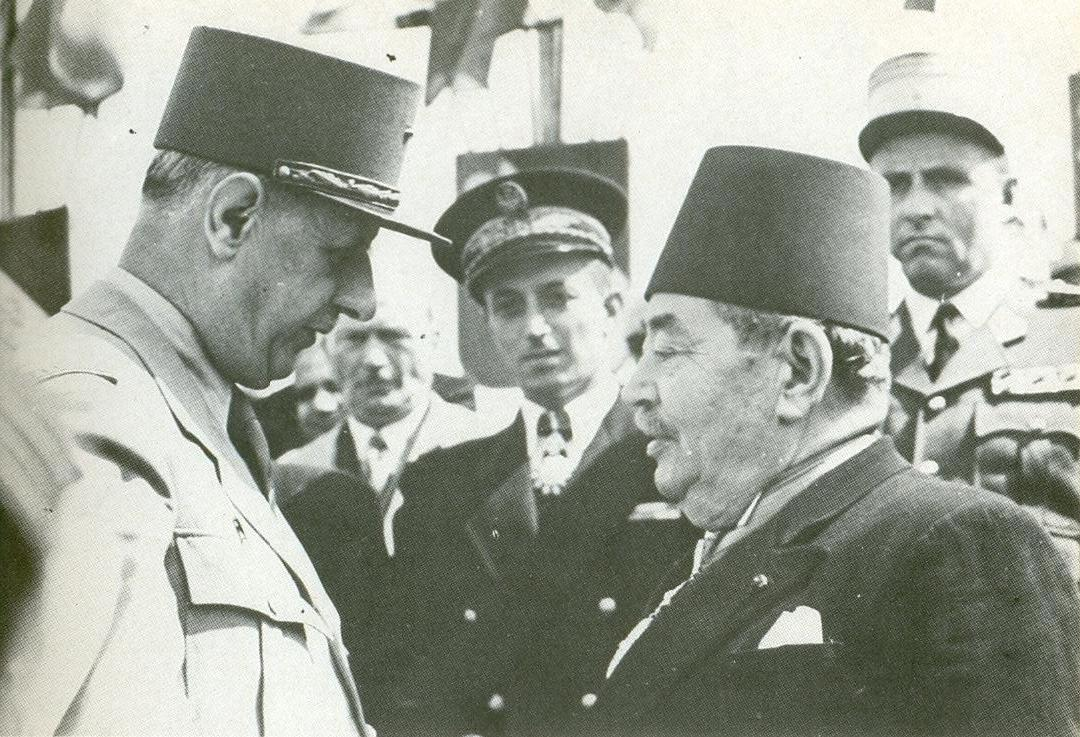
Charles de Gaulle and Baccouche in 1953.

He is the son of General Mohamed Baccouche, native of Cape Bon, Minister and Counselor beylical; his mother is Mamiya Ben Ayed, from a family of the Caidal aristocracy.

After having held several positions of caid in Sousse and Bizerte, he held the office of Grand Vizier twice during the reign of Lamine Bey from 15 May 1943 to 19 July 1947, and from 26 March 1952 to 2 March 1953.

He is often considered as one of the Tunisian personalities, who opposed the Tunisian national movement, with Mustapha Kaak, Abdelkader Belkhodja or Hédi Raïs.

He is the uncle of the writer Hachemi Baccouche.
