= Fellagha =

Faction of the Algerian War

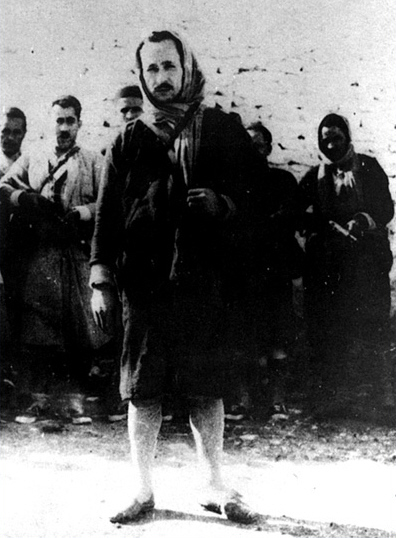
Group of fellaghas from the Tunisian Sahel region

The Fellagha, an Arabic word literally meaning "bandits" (الفلاقة, singular الفلاق), refers to groups of armed militants affiliated with anti-colonial movements in French North Africa. It most often is used to refer to armed Algerian nationalists who adopted violent means in order to push the French out of Algeria as well as groups in Tunisia who did the same. They were particularly important during the Algerian War (1954–1962) led by the National Liberation Front.

== Tunisian Fellagha ==
In Tunisia, Fellagha activity began after the assassination of labor leader Farhat Hached in late 1952. The fellagha attacked French colonial governance infrastructure as well as the property of French colons or settlers. The fellagha were somewhat disorganized but retained some links to the Hached's union, the UGTT, and the main national party, the Neo-Destour. The Neo-Destour was able to use its influence over the fellagha to convince France to guarantee Tunisia's internal autonomy.
