= Tahar Ben Ammar =

Tunisian politician

- الطاهر بن عما
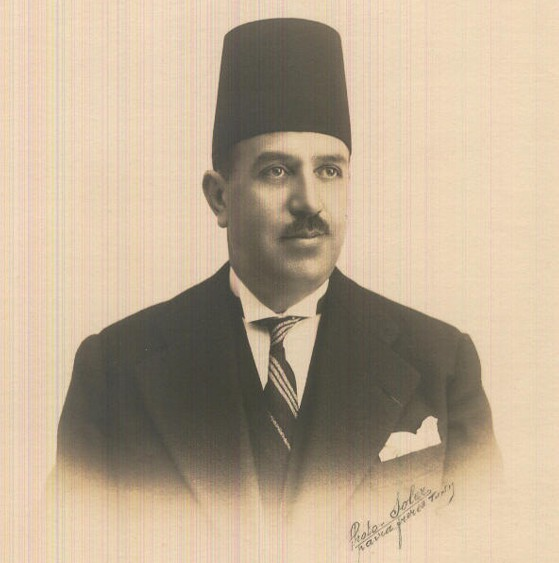
- Ben Ammar in 1916

Prime Minister of Tunisia
- In office 7 August 1954 – 11 April 1956
- Monarch: Muhammad VIII
- Preceded by: Mohamed Salah Mzali (Indirectly)
- Succeeded by: Habib Bourguiba

Personal details
- Born: 25 November 1889 Tunis, Tunisia
- Died: 10 May 1985 (aged 95)
- Party: Destour
- Profession: Farmer

Tahar Ben Ammar (25 November 1889 – 10 May 1985) (Arabic: الطاهر بن عمار) was a Tunisian politician.

== Biography ==
He was born in Tunis on 25 November 1889. He served as the last prime minister of Tunisia under French rule from 1954 to 1956, and was the first prime minister of the Kingdom of Tunisia, from 20 March to 11 April 1956.

Ben Ammar co-founded with Abdelaziz Thâalbi the Destour in March 1920. On 3 June 1955, he signed the first agreement for the internal autonomy of Tunisia and on 20 March 1956. Ben Ammar was the co- signatory of the official Memorandum of Understanding for Tunisia's independence with the French Foreign Minister Christian Pineau.

== Independence ==
On 20 March 1956 the Franco-Tunisian protocol was signed by the Grand Vizier Tahar Ben Ammar and the French Foreign Minister Christian Pineau. The new Tunisian government, led by Bourguiba, deemed the country to be independent by virtue of this protocol, and therefore refused to enter into the subsequent bilateral negotiations it provided for. Independence was regarded as a fait accompli, and for this reason the independence protocol was never ratified either by the Bey, or indeed by France, although this is what the protocol on internal autonomy required.

The process of Tunisian Independence occurred from 1952 to 1956 between France and a separatist movement led by Tahar Ben Ammar became the first Prime Minister. Habib Bourguiba. Bourguiba became the Two Prime Minister of the Kingdom of Tunisia after negotiations with France successfully brought an end to the colonial protectorate leading to independence.

His government resigned after the Constituent Assembly meeting on April 9, 1956. Habib Bourguiba was his successor until July 25, 1957; when he abolished the monarchy and proclaimed himself President of the first Republic of Tunisia. The newspaper is banned and, in solidarity with its director, Mohamed Masmoudi resigns from the Neo-Destour political office on September 8 . He was immediately relieved of his post of ambassador in Paris . Ben Yahmed ended up in exile in Paris where he created Afrique Action in October 1960, which will become Jeune Afrique.

The collectivization policy is used as a pretext to expropriate Tahar Ben Ammar from his property in Kharja in 1963. It was not until 1966 to see the former head of government again invited to the official ceremonies of the Republic. On 25 July 1969, he was decorated with the insignia of the great cordon of the Order of Independence. Victim of a cardiovascular accident in 1983, he died on 10 May 1985.
