= 1956 Tunisian Constituent Assembly election =

- 25 March 1956
- All 98 seats in the National Assembly; 49 seats needed for a majority
- Turnout: 83.56%
| Party | Leader | Vote % | Seats | +/– |
|---|---|---|---|---|
| National Union | Habib Bourguiba | 98.75 | 98 | New |
This lists parties that won seats. See the complete results below.
| Prime Minister after |
|---|
| Habib Bourguiba; RCD |

Constituent Assembly elections were held in Tunisia on 25 March 1956, five days after independence. The result was a victory for the National Union, an alliance of the Neo Destour party, the Tunisian General Labour Union, the National Union of Tunisian Farmers and the Tunisian Union of Craftsmen and Merchants, which won all 98 seats, with the opposition Communists and independents only receiving a combined 1% of the vote. Following the election, Habib Bourguiba was appointed Prime Minister of a Neo Destour-dominated government. Voter turnout was 84%.

== Results ==
| Party | Votes | % | Seats |
|---|---|---|---|
| National Union | 597,763 | 98.75 | 98 |
| Tunisian Communist Party | 7,352 | 1.21 | 0 |
| Independents | 235 | 0.04 | 0 |
| Total | 605,350 | 100.00 | 98 |
| Valid votes | 605,350 | 99.76 | |
| Invalid/blank votes | 1,447 | 0.24 | |
| Total votes | 606,797 | 100.00 | |
| Registered voters/turnout | 726,168 | 83.56 | |
Source: Nohlen et al.
