= Abdul Qadir Al Muhairi =

Tunisian linguist, politician

Abdelkader Mhiri
- Born: 7 August 1934
- Died: 13 May 2016 (aged 81)

Abdelkader Mhiri (Arabic: عبد القادر المهيري) (August 7, 1934 – May 13, 2016) was born in Sfax, Tunisia and died there. He was a linguist, politician, and an academic who is specialized in Arabic language and literature.

== Biography ==
Abdel Kader obtained his baccalaureate in 1951, a degree in French literature at the University of Paris in 1955, and a BA in Arabic language and literature in the same year from the same university. He obtained diplomas in French and Arabic literature, a Tabriz certificate in 1959, and a doctorate in 1970. He worked as a curator at the Carnot Institute in 1954, then a professor of higher education in 1974, then director of the Bourguiba Institute of Living Languages in 1986, appointed Dean of the Faculty of Humanities and Social Sciences in Tunisia, a position he occupied from 1970 to 1972, succeeding Muhamed Talbi.

Secretary of State in the Ministry of Higher Education from May 15 to November 7, 1987, he held the presidency of the Tunis University of Letters, Arts and Human Sciences between 1988 and 1995. He then chaired the Higher Education Evaluation Committee from 1995 to 1998.

He is a member of the Tunisian Academy of Sciences, Letters and Arts. In 2011, he received the Ibn Khaldoun Senghor Prize for translation from French into Arabic for the new encyclopedic dictionary of language sciences, and the King Abdullah bin Abdulaziz Prize for the English language, for his translation into Arabic, "Dictionary of Discourse Analysis" by Patrick Charodo and Dominic Mingueno. He is a Professor Emeritus at the University of Tunis, and for many years supervised the work of the second generation of Tunisian linguists.

== Publications ==
- A linguistic study of the first two readable books in Arabic in use in Tunisia. Center of Economic and Social Studies and Research, Tunisia, 1968.
- The most important linguistic schools. Center of Economic and Social Studies and Research, Tunisia, 119 pages, 1968.
- Theories of Ibn Jani Al-Nahwi. Faculty of Letters and Human Sciences, Tunis, 1973.
- Linguistic and poetic theory in the Arab heritage (with Hammadi Masoud and Abdel Salam Mesdi). Tunisian Company for Radio Broadcasting, 1988.
- Looks at the Arabic Linguistic Heritage. Dar al-Gharb al-Islami, Beirut, 260 pages, 1993.
- Autobiography. The Tunisian Linguistic Association of Tunis, 1997.
- From Word to Sentence. Institutions of Abdel Karim bin Abdullah, Tunisia, 1998.
- The Rhetorical Thinking of the Arabs. The National Pedagogical Center, Tunisia, 1998.
- Cultural Diversity and Cultural Rights (with Hammadi Masoud). Arab Institute for Human Rights, Tunisia, 2003.
- Linguistic Research. Faculty of Letters, Arts and Human Sciences, Manouba, La Manouba, 2008.
- The tiger and the fox by Sahl bin Harun.
