= Association Internationale des Musulmans Coraniques =

International Association of Quranic Muslims.
- الجمعية الدولية للمسلمين القرآنيين
- Abbreviation: AIMC
- Formation: 2013
- Founder: Mohamed Talbi
- Type: Non-governmental organisation
- Purpose: Promotion of a Quran-centric interpretation of Islam; opposition to salafism and takfir
- Headquarters: Tunisia
- Region served: International (primarily Tunisia)

The International Association of Quranic Muslims (AIMC; Arabic: الجمعية الدولية للمسلمين القرآنيين, French: Association Internationale des Musulmans Coraniques), is an organisation founded in Tunisia in 2013 by the Islamologist and historian Mohamed Talbi. It promotes an interpretation of Islam based solely on the Quran and opposes salafism and the practice of takfir.

== History ==
In early 2013 Mohamed Talbi announced plans to create the association. Its stated aims were to combat religious dictatorship and extremism, defend secularism (laïcité), and reject accusations of heresy (takfir). Talbi argued that the Quran unites Muslims while theological schools divide them.

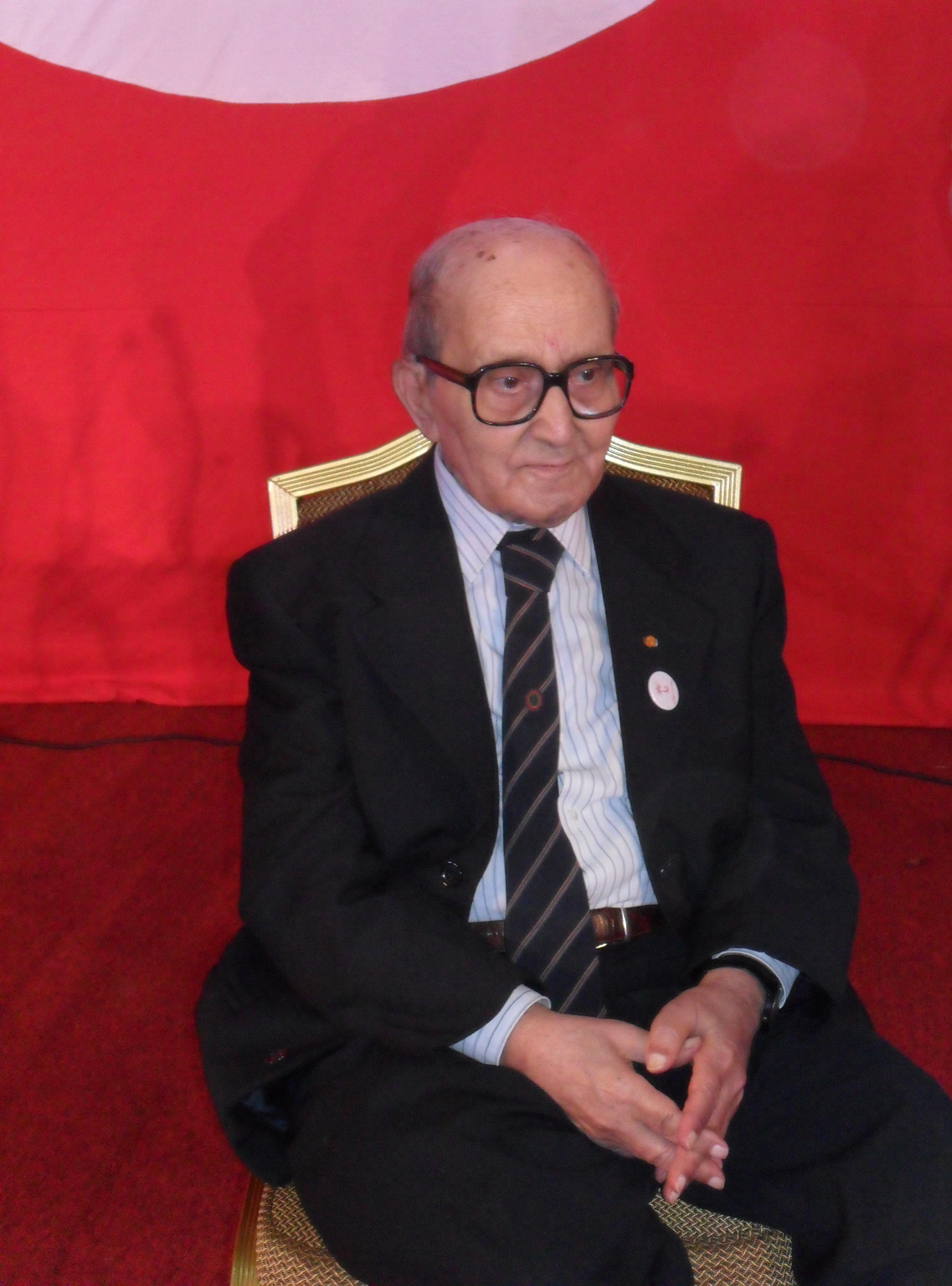
Mohamed Talbi

The Tunisian government secretariat initially refused to register the association under its chosen name. Officials required the removal of the words “coraniques”, “laïcité” and “salafisme” from the statutes, as well as revision of language describing the sharia as a non-binding human product dating from the third century of the Hijra. Talbi described the refusal as a political decision by the Ennahdha-led Troika government rather than a purely legal one.

Despite the registration difficulties, the association held its inaugural meeting on 11 April 2013 under Talbi’s direction. The session focused on Quranic interpretation and the concept of the “Quranic Muslim”.

== Objectives ==
According to contemporary statements by Talbi, the association’s principles included:

- Reliance on the Quran as the sole binding religious authority
- Rejection of sharia as a later human construct
- Intellectual opposition to salafism and takfir
- Promotion of freedom of thought, tolerance and the separation of religion and state
