= Hichem Djait =

Tunisian historian (1935–2021)

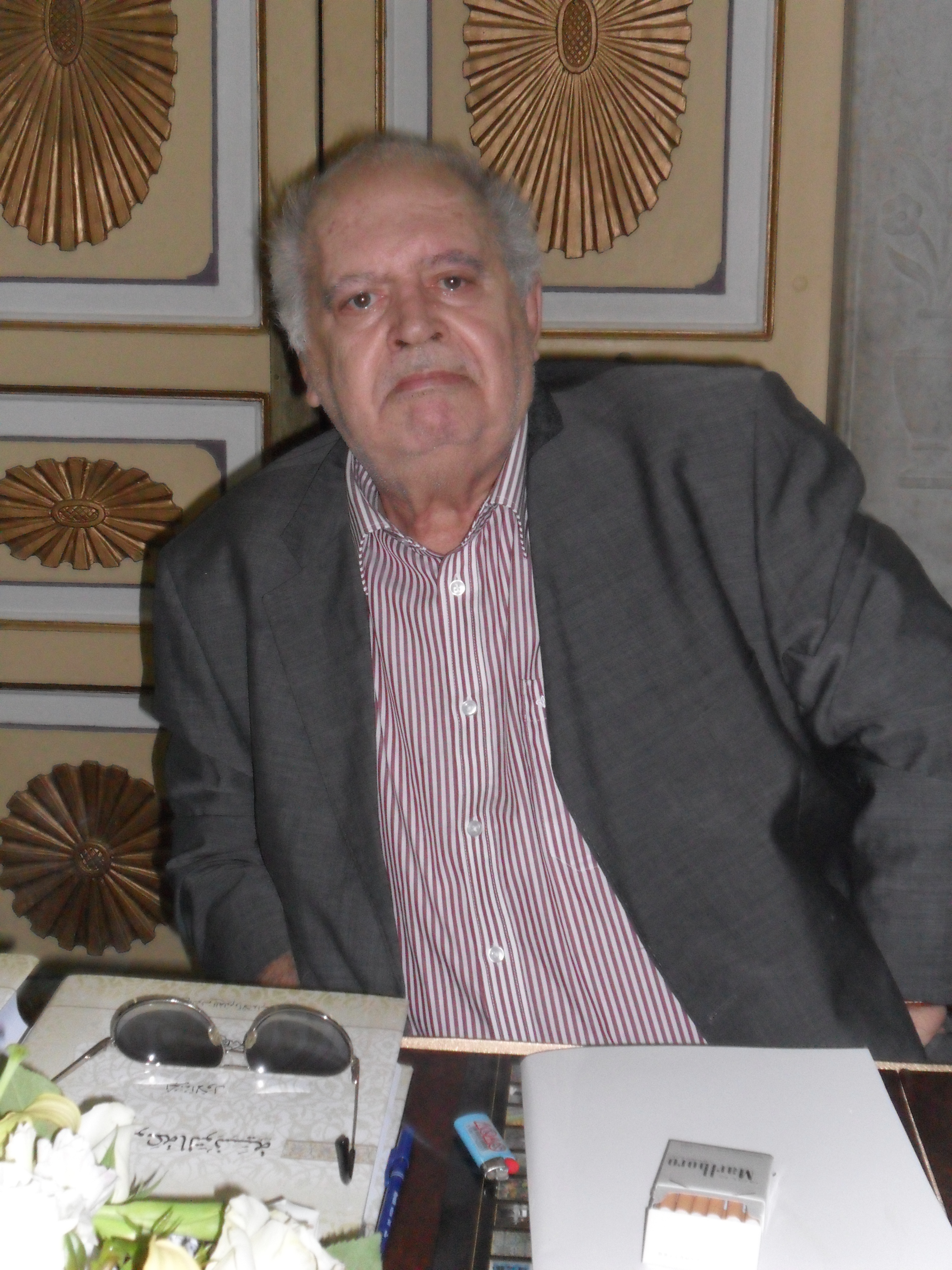
- Born: December 6, 1935; Tunis, Tunisia
- Died: June 1, 2021 (aged 85)

Academic work
- Era: 20th-century philosophy
- Main interests: Islamic studies
- Notable works: The Great Fitna (1989); The Life of Muhammad (2001–2012)

Hichem Djait (Arabic: هشام جعيط; December 6, 1935 – June 1, 2021), also known as Hichem Jaiet, was a prominent historian and scholar of Islam.

== Biography ==
Djait was born in 1935 in Tunis, Tunisia to a conservative upper-middle-class family. His father and some of his uncles and relatives were Islamic sages (or sheikhs), which made the name of the Djait family become traditionally associated with the Zeytouna Mosque as well as with Islamic Fiqh and Iftah (or jurisprudence). He completed his secondary education at Sadiki College, where he studied French, world literature, Western philosophy, Arabic, and Islamic Studies. This training made him discover Enlightenment thinkers and the ideals of the Renaissance and the Reformation, which were different from the teachings of his family's conservative milieu. Djait later travelled to France, where he received the "Aggregation" diploma in History in 1962. His completed his doctoral defense in Arts and Humanities in Paris in 1981.

He became an emeritus Professor at the University of Tunis. He was also a visiting professor at the McGill University and the University of California at Berkeley. In addition to the numerous honorary titles and awards he received, Djait was member of the European Academy of Sciences and Arts and was appointed president of the Tunisian Academy of Sciences, Letters, and Arts on February 17, 2012.

He was a specialist in Medieval Islamic history and member of the International Scientific Institute for the General History of Africa edited by the UNESCO. In the many books he published in Tunisia and France, he mainly deals with subjects related to Arab-Islamic culture, history, and philosophy, as well as to the relationship between Islam and modernity and the place of Islam in the contemporary world. He believed that national identity and religious culture may be related but are not mutually constitutive and supported the political principle of laicite (secularism) "which will not be hostile to Islam, and does not draw its motivation from anti-Islamic feeling." His 1989 publication The Great Fitna (or The Great Discord) came to be known as a seminal study and revolutionary reading of Islamic history following the death of Muhammad.The Great Fitna is often described by scholars and critics as the most influential reference on the subject. Other works include Europe and Islam (1978), The Revelation, the Quran and the Prophecy (1986), The Crisis of Islamic Culture (2004) and a ground-breaking study entitled The Life of Muhammad, first published in French between 2001 and 2007 and released in English in 2012. The three volumes of the latter study, which cover the itinerary of Muhammad and the concomitant evolution of Islam, are subtitled "Revelation and Prophecy," "Predication in Mecca," and "The Prophet’s Life in Medina and the Triumph of Islam."

Djait was also a chess grandmaster, and was president of the FTE, the Tunisian chess federation from 1980 to 1981.

== Awards and honours ==
- 1989: Tunisian National Humanities Award (Tunis)
- 1996: Commander of the Order of the Republic of Tunisia
- 2006: Al Owais Award (Dubai)
- 2016: Arab Book Award (Beirut)
- 2017: Tunisia's Comar d'Or Prize (Tunis)
- 2018: Tunisian University Medal (Tunis)
- 2018: Medal of the Arab World Institute (Paris)
- 2019: Grand Officier of the Order of the Republic of Tunisia
- 2023: Ibn Khaldun Award in Humanities (granted posthumously; Tunis)

== Main publications ==
=== In English ===
- Europe and Islam : Cultures and Modernity, Berkeley, ed. University of California Press, 1985
- Islamic Culture in Crisis : A Reflection on Civilizations in History, New Jersey, ed. Transaction Publishers, 2011
- The Life of Muhammad, 3 vols, Carthage, ed. Beït El Hikma, 2012

=== In French ===
- Histoire générale de la Tunisie. t. II : Le Moyen Âge, (with Mohamed Talbi), Tunis, ed. Société tunisienne de diffusion, 1965
- Rêver de la Tunisie, Paris, ed. Vilo, 1971
- La Personnalité et le devenir arabo-islamique, Paris, ed. Le Seuil, 1974
- L'Europe et l'Islam, Paris, ed. Le Seuil, 1978
- Al-Kūfa, naissance de la ville islamique, Paris, ed. Maisonneuve et Larose, 1986
- La Grande Discorde : religion et politique dans l'islam des origines, Paris, ed. Gallimard, 1989
- Connaissance de l'Islam, (with Mohamed Arkoun), Paris, ed. Syros-Alternatives, 1992
- La Vie de Muhammad. vol. I : Révélation et prophétie, Paris, ed. Fayard, 2001
- La Crise de la culture islamique, Paris, ed. Fayard, 2004
- La Fondation du Maghreb islamique, Tunis, ed. Amal, 2004
- La Vie de Muhammad. vol. II : La Prédication prophétique à La Mecque, Paris, ed. Fayard, 2008
- La Vie de Muhammad. t. III : Le parcours du Prophète à Médine et le triomphe de l'Islam, Paris, Fayard, 2012
- Penser l'Histoire, penser la Religion, Tunis, ed. Cérès, 2021
