= Jérôme Champagne =

French diplomat

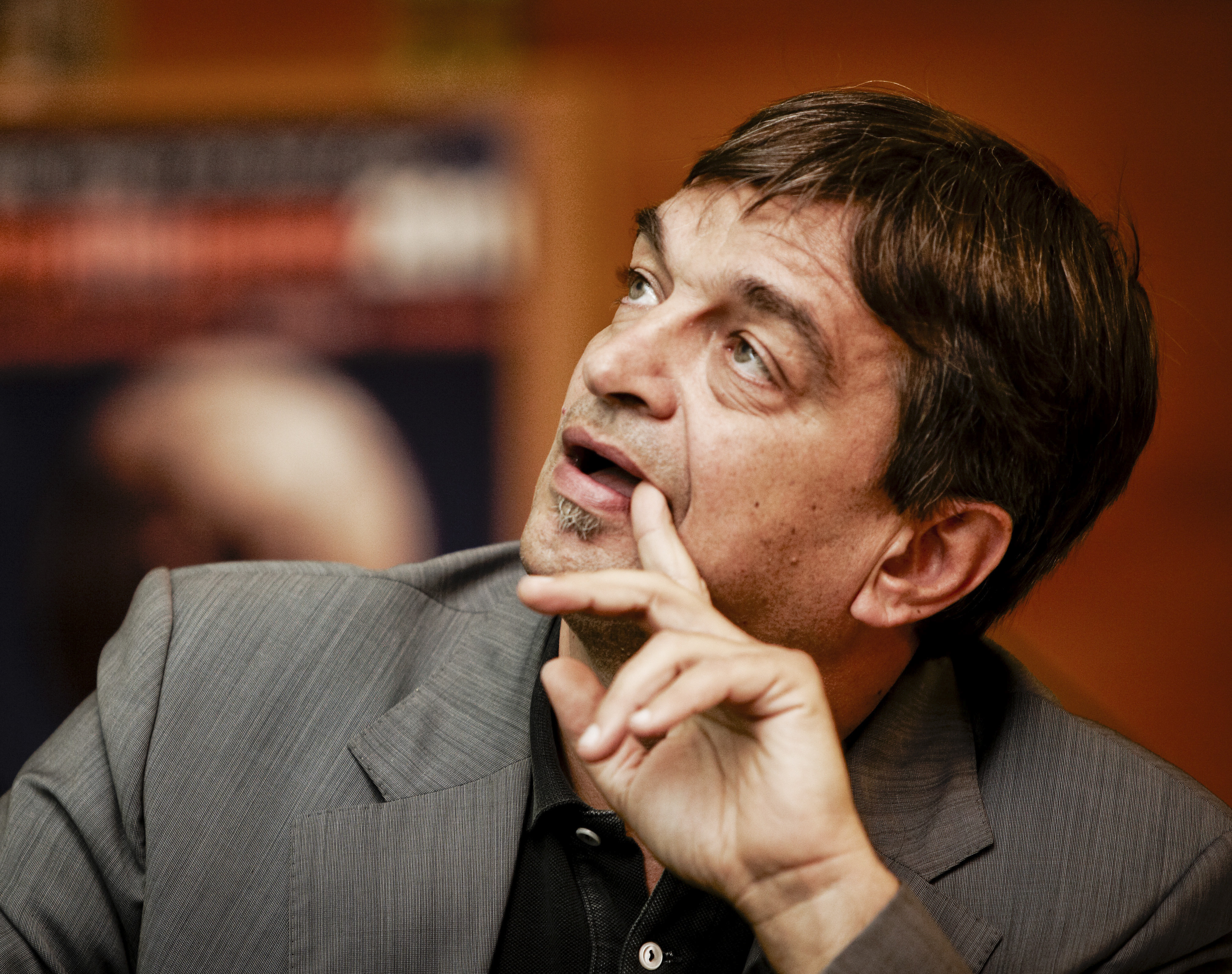
- Jérôme Champagne in 2011
- Born: June 15, 1958 (age 68); Paris
- Education: Paris Institute of Political Studies (Sciences-Po); the École Nationale des Langues et Civilisations Orientales (INALCO)
- Occupations: Diplomat; Consultant in international football Essayist; Speaker
- Children: 3
- Honours: National Order of the Southern Cross

Jérôme Champagne (born June 15, 1958) is a former French diplomat. He served from 1983 to 1998, and then became a consultant in international football, serving as an executive at FIFA from 1999 to 2010.

He transitioned from diplomacy to football as a result of the 1998 FIFA World Cup, where he was diplomatic advisor and chief of protocol of the French organizing committee. He then joined FIFA where he successively held the positions of international adviser to the president (1999–2002), deputy secretary general (2002–05), delegate of the president (2005–07) and finally director of international relations (2007–10) during the terms of President Sepp Blatter.

He left FIFA in 2010 and became football commissioner for the World Festival of Black Arts in Dakar (2010) and an adviser to the Palestinian Football Federation (PFA) and the Palestine Olympic Committee (POC), the Football Federation of Kosovo, the Cyprus Turkish Football Federation (CTFA) and finally the Congolese football club TP Mazembe of Lubumbashi.

Champagne was twice a candidate to replace Blatter in FIFA's presidency elections of 2015 and 2016. However, each time he failed to secure enough support.

== Youth and education ==
Jérôme Champagne was born on June 15, 1958 in Paris. He was educated at the Lycée d'Arsonval in Saint-Maur-des-Fossés (France) before entering in 1978 at the Paris Institute of Political Studies (Sciences-Po) where he graduated in 1981 as well as at the Ecole Nationale des Langues et Civilisations Orientales (INALCO). Eligible for the École nationale d'administration in 1982, he joined thereafter the Ministry of Foreign and European Affairs (France) with the rank of Secretary of Foreign Affairs.

Between 1976 and 1983, he was a freelancer for France Football where he wrote in "foreign pages" under the direction of Jacques Ferran, Jean-Philippe Rethacker and Jacques Thibert.

Since childhood, Champagne has been a strong supporter of AS Saint-Étienne.

He is married and has three children.

== Career ==
=== Diplomatic career ===
==== Councilor of foreign affairs ====
In 1983, Jérôme Champagne began a diplomatic career as secretary of foreign affairs. From 1983 to 1997, he was successively cultural and technical cooperation attaché with the Embassy of France in Oman (1983–1984), the third secretary at the Embassy of France in Cuba (1985–1987), technical advisor to the Department of Economic Affairs – section High Technologies – at the Quai d'Orsay (1987–1991), deputy consul general at the Consulate General of France in Los Angeles (1991–1995) and first secretary in charge of domestic policy at the Embassy of France in Brazil (1995–1997), where he received the National Order of the Southern Cross from the hands of Extraordinary Sports Minister at the time, Pelé.

==== Diplomatic advisor and chief of protocol of the CFO/LOC France 1998 ====
While he was deputy consul general in Los Angeles, Jerome Champagne met the leaders of the organizing committee of the 1998 FIFA World Cup, the co-chairs Fernand Sastre and Michel Platini and General Manager fr:Jacques Lambert. On behalf of the French Organizing Committee (CFO) and the Consulate General of France in Los Angeles, He organized the Bastille Day ceremony on July 14, 1994, in Los Angeles, three days before the final of the 1994 FIFA World Cup, the theme of which was the promotion of the 1998 FIFA World Cup.

In 1997, Champagne became diplomatic adviser and chief of protocol of the French Organizing Committee (CFO) of the 1998 FIFA World Cup. During that competition Champagne met Blatter, then secretary general of FIFA and the candidate to succeed João Havelange. Upon Blatter's election to the head of the institution in June 1998, he appointed Champagne as an international adviser, and Michel Platini as football adviser of the new president of the FIFA.

=== FIFA career ===
During the eleven years spent in FIFA, Champagne followed sport-political issues, relations with FIFA member associations as well as specific projects such as the FIFA Centennial, FIFA's relations with governments and the European Union including the defense of the specificity of sport at the EU, the Win in Africa with Africa initiative, FIFA's support for Palestinian football, the improvements in FIFA's relationship with FIFPro for the good of the governance of world football, the development of CIES Football Observatory, and FIFA's relations with the International Olympic Committee and other international federations.

He is also credited for having contributed to the reelection of President Sepp Blatter in 2002, supported the latter during the choice of South Africa in May 2004 for the 2010 FIFA World Cup and worked behind the scenes for the election in January 2007 of Michel Platini as president of UEFA.

In terms of football development, he was responsible in 2006 of the "Win in Africa with Africa" program, whose idea emerged after a meeting in 2005 between the President of South Africa, Thabo Mbeki and Sepp Blatter so that the whole continent would benefit from the first FIFA World Cup held in Africa. With a budget of $70 million voted in the FIFA Congress in Munich in 2006, this program will enable the construction of more than fifty synthetic fields, the computerization of players’ registration, the reorganization of the formats of many local leagues and the establishment of sports management courses in Egypt, Senegal and South Africa.

In addition, Champagne has led several draws for FIFA competitions including the draw in December 2003 of the 2006 FIFA World Cup qualification

Champagne had been suggested as a potential replacement for Blatter, and in September 2014 he declared he would run for the FIFA presidency at its 2015 election. In January 2015, he declared he would run a clean campaign and would consider taking the 2022 World Cup away from Qatar if he won the election. However, he failed to obtain enough support, and withdrew his candidacy in February 2015. In October 2015 he declared himself a candidate for the 2016 election for the presidency following the corruption investigation and Blatter's suspension, but again failed, only gaining seven votes in the election.

=== Consultant for international football ===
In 2010, Champagne leaves his position as director of international relations of FIFA. He explained his departure in describing himself as a "political fuse".

He then practiced as a consultant in international football individually and within the agency Football Future.

Appointed Adviser to Palestinian Football Association in 2010, he works with its president, Jibril Rajoub for the creation of a professional league, the development of women's football and the organization at home in 2011, the first time in history, of 2014 FIFA World Cup qualification (AFC) (against Afghanistan) and to the football tournament of the Olympic Games (against Thailand).

He plays an active role in the rapprochement between the two Palestinian and Israeli National Olympic Committees led by the International Olympic Committee after the visit to the region of Jacques Rogge in October 2010 and also in the negotiations conducted by FIFA President Sepp Blatter in 2013 for the establishment of a mediation mechanism between FIFA, the Palestinian Football Association and Israel Football Association.

Since 2011, he advises the Football Federation of Kosovo in its quest for international recognition.

In 2011, he became adviser to the Congolese club TP Mazembe (TPM), chaired since 1998 by Moïse Katumbi Chapwe. His mission is to work for the internationalization of the club and to help the club to become a model on the African continent.

In the summer of 2013, Jean-Marc Adjovi-Bocco, a former professional RC Lens and captain of Benin national football team, "The Squirrels of Benin ", he leads a consulting mission on behalf of the Government of Benin for the definition of a "modernization strategy" for local football.

Since autumn 2012, Champagne also plays a leading role in the rapprochement between the Greek Cyprus Football Association and Cyprus Turkish Football Federation. He contributes to the signing on November 5, 2013, in Zürich, of the first agreement since 1955 between the two football associations for a reunification.

== Ideas and key positions ==
Champagne is considered in the world of football as a reformist.

He has denounced the effects of individualism and short-termism on football:

Like the rest of the world and other human activities, football has been experiencing in the last twenty years a dangerous cocktail of deregulation, globalization in a context of systemic research of legal, tax, regulatory and judicial loopholes to escape from the football regulations

— Jérôme Champagne, Which FIFA for the 21st century?

Thus he addressed himself in 2012 to all 209 football federations through a 26-page document entitled "Which FIFA for the 21st century?". He explains his approach as "rather than a top-down approach, it is necessary to start from football and to be aware of these central issues to define what needs to be achieved and to determine what FIFA could become in the twenty-first century."

=== "The 7 Governance Challenges for the 21st Century" ===
Jérôme Champagne identifies seven challenges for tomorrow's football.

1. The imbalance between amateur football and professional football
2. The balance between club football and national team football
3. The divide between the European football and football around the world
4. The precarious relationship between players and clubs
5. The relationship of football with money between the need of it and the dangers of its excesses
6. The autonomy of football from political power
7. The excesses of economic deregulation in the economy of football

According to him, these substantive changes have produced "few winners but also many losers".

In face of this crisis of a rudderless globalization without governance, states lose ground to the markets and the stock exchanges. But take this sentence and replace the words "states", "markets" and stock exchanges" by "federations", "leagues" and "clubs" respectively, the similarity is even more striking.

— Jérôme Champagne, Which FIFA for the 21st century?

=== "The 11 concrete proposals" ===
According to Champagne, the debate on the future of FIFA should be around four axes: a global football governance dominated by a proactive FIFA, the repositioning football associations in the heart of decision-making process, a fairer distribution of revenues to compensate football existing inequalities and ultimately a governance based on modernity, transparency, democratic debate and ethics.

Taking into account these four axes, Champagne has outlined 11 concrete proposals in order to reform FIFA.

1. Revive the democratic debate within football pyramid
2. Increase even more development programs with new solidarity mechanisms
3. Involve leagues, clubs and players in the decision-making process
4. Restore the role and the centrality of the FAs while clarifying the relations with the confederations
5. Adjust FIFA to the evolutions of today's world to reflect them better
6. Reshuffle the power responsibilities between the FIFA president, the executive committee and the associations
7. Strengthen FIFA's governance structures
8. Reform FIFA's administration
9. Modify the insulation of refereeing debates
10. Define and implement a more comprehensive notion of autonomy
11. Reconnect FIFA with the "people of football"

Although he is favorable that the powers of the football associations be expanded, Champagne also suggests broadening the FIFA Executive Committee from 24 members to 31 members. It would include the president of the players union, FIFPro, and a representative of the clubs and of the leagues. Other additional seats would be allocated to areas in Africa, Asia, North America and Central America-Caribbean, South America and a seat reserved for women's football.

In his many public interventions, he is committed to the rebalancing of power between those involved in football but also between continents, and adapting FIFA to the changes of the 21st century (ethics and transparency requirement, role of new technologies including a modernized refereeing) and a stronger proactive approach in correcting imbalances football between continents, countries and clubs.

== Honours ==
- Officer of the Brazilian National Order of the Southern Cross (1997)
- Commander of the Moroccan Order of Ouissam Alaouite (2004)
- Knight of the French National Order of Merit (2005)
