= Kingdom of Tunisia =

1956–1957 monarchy in Northern Africa

Coordinates: 36°50′N 10°9′E

Kingdom of Tunisia Royaume de Tunisie المملكة التونسية
- 1956–1957
- Flag Coat of arms
- Motto: حرية، نظام، عدالة "Ḥurrīyah, Niẓām, 'Adālah" "Freedom, Order, Justice"
- Anthem: Salam al-Bey (Royal Anthem)
- Capital: Tunis
- Common languages: Tunisian Arabic, French
- Religion: Islam
- Government: Unitary parliamentary constitutional monarchy
- King
  - 1956–1957: Muhammad VIII
- Crown Prince
  - 1956–1957: Prince Husain
- Prime Minister
  - 1956 (first): Tahar Ben Ammar
  - 1956–1957 (last): Habib Bourguiba
- Legislature: Constituent Assembly
- History
  - Independence: 20 March 1956
  - Declaration of the republic: 25 July 1957
- Currency: Tunisian franc
Preceded by	Succeeded by
French protectorate of Tunisia	Republic of Tunisia

The Kingdom of Tunisia (French: Royaume de Tunisie; Arabic: المملكة التونسية el-Mamlka et-Tūnsīya) was a short-lived monarchy established after Tunisian independence and the end of the French protectorate period. It lasted for a period of one year and five months between 20 March 1956, the day of the independence, until 25 July 1957, the day of the declaration of the republic. Its sole monarch was Muhammad VIII al-Amin (also known as Lamine Bey) who appointed the prime ministers Tahar Ben Ammar and Habib Bourguiba.

On 25 July 1957, the monarchy was abolished with Tunisia reorganizing as a republic. The National Constituent Assembly, the country's legislature, appointed Bourguiba as head of state until the 1959 general elections, which Bourguiba won.

== History ==
An independence movement lasting many decades eventually prevailed, leading to the end of the French protectorate (commenced in 1881). In 1954 the Tunisian struggle and consequent civil disturbances resulted in the start of negotiations for autonomy between France and the Neo Destour political party (essentially under Habib Bourguiba) supported by the Tunisian labor unions and by the Arab League. The agreed Convention of April, 1955, stated that France would retain control of the army and foreign affairs while granting autonomy, which was to begin the following year. Bourguiba was released from prison by the French to a tumultuous welcome. This compromise, however, split the Neo Destour; eventually it led to suppression of its left wing, and expulsion of its radical, pan-Arab leader Salah ben Youssef, who later fled to Egypt. This resolution of intra-party strife signalled that Neo Destour would pursue a moderate path. The French then terminated their protectorate over Morocco, in order to concentrate their forces in Algeria. In reaction, and following the strong public opinion voiced by Tunisians, Bourguiba pressed for independence. The French, overcoming the heated objections of the French settlers, eventually acceded and protocols were drafted. On 20 March 1956, Tunisia achieved its full sovereignty. In July Tunisia's application for membership in the United Nations was accepted.

== Independence ==
The French conceived an independent Tunisia as a constitutional monarchy ruled by the Bey of Tunis, Muhammad VIII al-Amin.

The prior Bey Muhammad VII al-Munsif had been a popular nationalist, but Amin Bey was both considered by some to be compromised by the French, by others to be a youssefist, or follower of Ben Youssef. Already scheduled elections were held on 25 March 1956; due to secret arrangements negotiated by Bourguiba with the Bey the voters choose only party lists, not candidates. This arrangement made it easier for the Neo Destour party to keep out any youssefist or other dissidents, and to maintain party discipline. The elections were then swept by the Neo Destour party, whose leader Habib Bourguiba became prime minister.

== Government ==
King of Tunisia
- Royal Coat of arms

Details
- First monarch: Muhammad VIII
- Last monarch: Muhammad VIII
- Formed: 20 March 1956
- Abolished: 25 July 1957
- Residence: Royal Palace of Carthage
- Appointer: Hereditary
- Pretender: Prince Husain

The Kingdom of Tunisia was a constitutional and hereditary monarchy with legislative power being exercised by the Parliament.

=== King ===
The King is considered the leader of the Husainid dynasty that reigned over Tunisia since 1705. He is the head of state, the symbol of its unity, and the protector of its independence.

The King had a very limited role since the Parliament abolished all privileges, exemptions and immunities which had previously been accorded to the Ruling Family. They became simply ordinary citizens.

The Royal Family and the state were also separated by modifying the national emblems and removing any reference to the Husainid dynasty.

The government removed the King's prerogative to pass regulations, transferring this to the Prime Minister.

Other decrees followed, compelling the King to turn over various properties to the state. These measures served to greatly reduce the remaining prestige of the King. Nonetheless King Muhammad VIII was the first person to be honoured, on 19 December 1956, with the decoration of the new Order of Independence.

The king no longer had any significant role and he did not have any executive power, which all became in the hands of the government.

There is no longer a Royal Guard for the king also after it was replaced by the Tunisian armed forces by the government a few days before the proclamation of the republic.

=== Prime minister ===
After the declaration of independence, the role of the prime minister in Tunisia became very important, as he became the ruler of the country replacing the king, as he was the one who signed the independence treaty between Tunisia and France.

What increased its value was that it was named according to the elections that were held in March 1956, meaning that Tunisia became a constitutional parliamentary monarchy.

During the Kingdom era, the Prime Minister was able to start numerous reforms aiming to modernize Tunisian society and change their mentalities. On 31 May 1956, he abolished royal privileges, which made royal princes and princesses equal to other citizens and punishable by law. The same day, he suppressed the property legislation of habous, deeply rooted in Islamic traditions. He also ended Zitouna Mosque's education purposes by creating Zitouna University, which taught Islamic knowledge under the supervision of the ministry of Education. Likewise, Koranic schools were, from that moment on, under governmental oversight, the ministry preparing a detailed program and managing them. Furthermore, free education was proclaimed and teachers trained. He also started a gender equality campaign, advocating for women rights including: universal education for girls equally with boys, women admission to employment under the same conditions as men, free consent to marriage and veil removal. Even though, conservatives were strongly opposed to his reforms, the campaign ended to be a huge success. The prime minister's power was confirmed successfully by the adoption of the Code of Personal Status, a major legislation that reorganized families. Therefore, repudiation was replaced with divorce while woman had to consent to their marriages, suppression paternal agreement. In addition, Polygyny was prohibited and equality between fathers and mothers but also between children was part of the law. The government also reformed the judicial system, suppressing religious courts and initiating governmental ones.

== Legislature ==
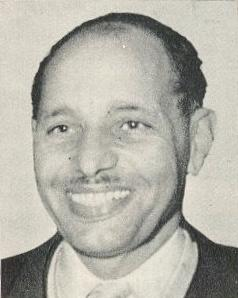
Jallouli Fares, Speaker of the Constituent Assembly of Tunisia.

The National Constituent Assembly (Arabic: المجلس القومي التأسيسي) was the legislature of Tunisia during the monarchy. It served as a unicameral parliament consisting of 98 members elected on 25 March 1956, five days after the proclamation of the independence of Tunisia.

The National Union, an alliance of the Neo Destour led by Habib Bourguiba, the Tunisian General Labour Union, the Tunisian Union of Agriculture and Fisheries and the Tunisian Confederation of Industry, Trade and Handicrafts, won all the seats, with 98% of the votes cast for a participation of 83.6%.

The speaker of the Constituent Assembly have to the apply of the rules of procedure, the decisions taken during the plenary sessions and the decisions of the office. He chairs the meetings of the office of the assembly as well as the plenary sessions.

The first incumbent was Habib Bourguiba, elected by the constituent assembly on 9 April 1956. On 15 April, following the assembly's decision to appoint him as Prime Minister, he was replaced by Jallouli Fares, until the adoption of the constitution on 1 June 1959.

This proved the importance given to the Constituent Assembly since the appointment of the prime minister came from it.

In addition to its duties of adopting a constitution for the country, the Assembly took on decisive decisions in the country's history, including voting unanimously for the abolition of the monarchy, and the proclamation of the Republic on 25 July 1957 and the appointment of Bourguiba as the first president of the Tunisian Republic.

== Subdivisions ==
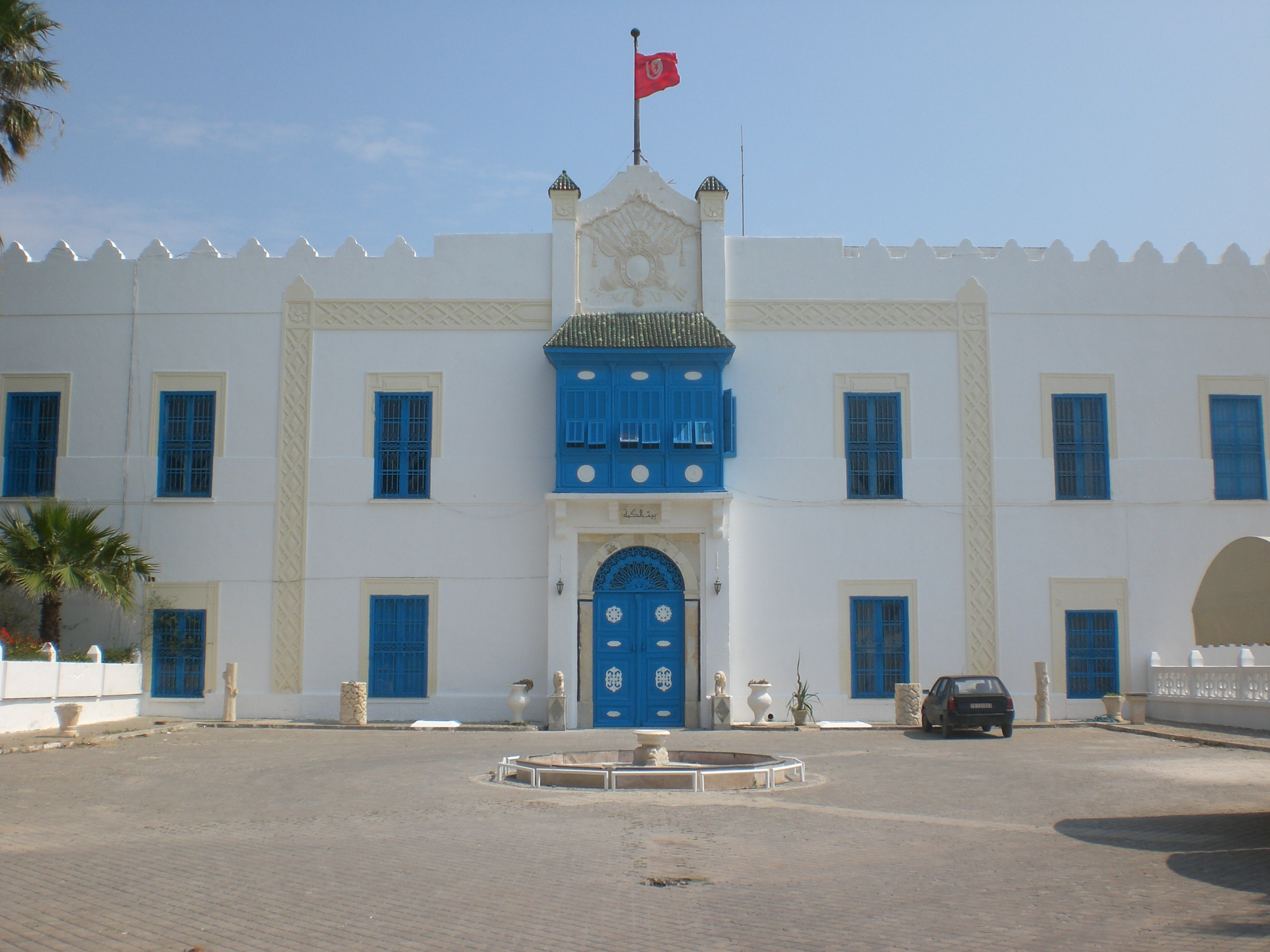
Royal Palace of Carthage.

The governorate system was set up by the decree of June 21, 1956 by the Prime minister of the Kingdom of Tunisia Habib Bourguiba. The latter organized the regional administration, henceforth carried out by governors, general secretaries and delegates. The framework law, adopted accordingly, removes the charges for:

- 38 caïds in office including Sheikh El Medina of Tunis;
- 49 kahias in office and five in excess;
- 77 active khalifas and 18 in excess.

The body of governors which takes over from the Caidal authorities is chosen from among the Neo-Destour executives. The Makhzen, made up of families who controlled the regional administration, is dismantled. Justifying the decision, Prime Minister Habib Bourguiba declared, before the National Council of Neo-Destour, on June 23, 1956:

"We felt it necessary to purify these frameworks to ensure cooperation based on reciprocal respect between the State personified in its representatives and the people who must respect in them, no longer the agents of colonization, but the servants of the public interest. For the vast majority of executives affected by the cleansing, the blow was hard. Some suffer terribly from it. But we were in an inescapable necessity."

Fourteen governorates emerged with independence which are:

- Béja Governorate
- Bizerte Governorate
- Gabès Governorate
- Gafsa Governorate
- Jendouba Governorate
- Kairouan Governorate
- Kasserine Governorate
- Le Kef Governorate
- Médenine Governorate
- Nabeul Governorate
- Sfax Governorate
- Sousse Governorate
- Tozeur Governorate
- Tunis Governorate

== Reforms of the kingdom ==
Prime Minister Bourguiba, since the first months of independence, carried out radical reforms in Tunisian society. On 13 August 1956, he issued the Code of Personal Status in Tunisia that banned polygamy and mandated the courts to consider divorce requests while endowments were dissolved and the judiciary unified. On the administrative level, in June 1956, the "al-Kiyadat" (Caïds) was abolished and replaced by 14 governorates consisting of delegations. In the same month, the National Army was dispatched and, before that, in April 1956, security came under Tunisian leadership. The government also made relentless efforts to rest the state structures. He also issued an order on 31 May 1956, which stipulated the suspension of the financial privileges that were spent on members of the royal family.

On 21 June of the same year, an order was issued to alter the emblem of the Kingdom of Tunisia, according to which all references to the Husainid dynasty were deleted. On 3 August 1956, another order was issued transferring the executive powers from the king to his prime minister. The Royal Guard was also replaced by a unit of the newly formed Tunisian army.

On confirmation of this, Bourguiba worked to gradually reduce the influence of the king, who by this point only exercised ceremonial functions and a small part of the legislative authority, such as putting his stamp on and signing orders, decisions and decrees presented to him by his prime minister every Thursday, thus leading to a type of governance resembling a parliamentary system similar to the British monarchy.

== Declaration of the republic ==
Following his return from France and the conclusion of the internal independence agreements in 1955, Bourguiba sought to reassure members of the royal family and ambassadors of great powers accredited to Tunisia that a constitutional monarchy would be adopted. On the other hand, he was alluding to these with some counter-references, similar to what was stated in his inaugural speech at the Constituent Assembly on 8 April 1956, in which he praised Muhammad VII, acknowledging that he was a strong Republican.

On 15 July 1957, security forces imposed a guard on the royal palace, preventing entry and exit from it. The police also imposed surveillance on all roads leading to the royal palace. On 18 July, Bourguiba launched an attack on the royal family, focusing on their disdain for the law. The next day, the police arrested the youngest son of the king, Prince Slah Eddine (32 years old), and he was imprisoned in the civilian prison of Tunis. Then the Prime Minister Bourguiba and the Minister of Foreign Affairs met on 23 July with the Tunisian ambassadors in Paris, Washington, Cairo, Rome, London, Madrid and Rabat, asking about the expected reactions from these countries if the king will be deposed. It appeared that these diplomats advised Bourguiba to seek moderation. The Tunisian ambassador to Rabat informed the attendees that such an act would be viewed with suspicion in Morocco and might be met with disapproval due to the friendship between the Tunisian and Moroccan royal families.

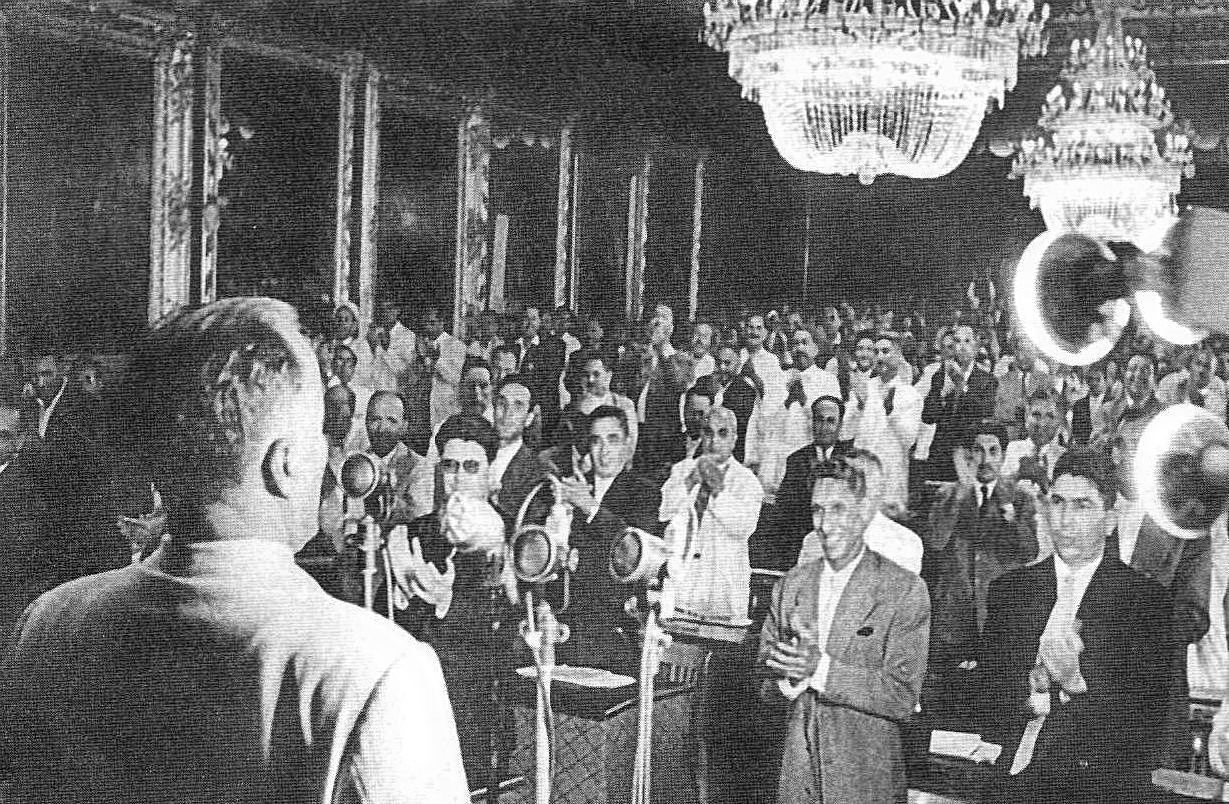
Proclamation of the republic in the constituent assembly.

On the evening of 23 July, the political office of the Neo Destour Party decided to call the Constituent Assembly to convene on 25 July to consider the form of the state and entrusted it, implicitly, with the task of declaring the republic. On the day of the session, Tunisian and foreign media, including radio and written press, were invited to attend the events, in addition to an invitation to the diplomatic corps. At half past nine in the morning, the National Constituent Assembly opened its works. From the start, the speaker defined the topic of the session by saying that its agenda was to consider the form of the state. After calling the deputies, the interventions focused on the need to define the form of the state, highlight the faults of the monarchy, and call for a republican system.

At six o'clock in the evening, the National Constituent Assembly voted unanimously to abolish the monarchy and establish the Republic of Tunisia. The Assembly then made Bourguiba its first president.

=== Text of the declaration of the Republic ===
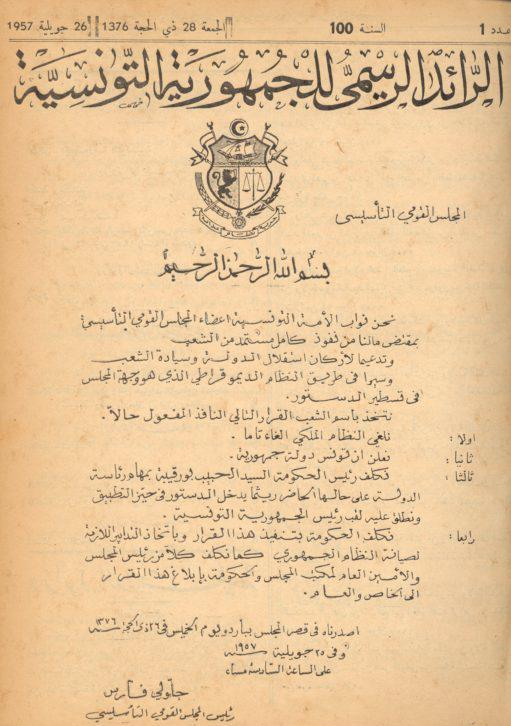
Text of the declaration of the Republic (in Arabic).

In the name of God the Merciful

We, the representatives of the Tunisian nation, members of the National Constituent Assembly, by virtue of the full influence we have derived from the people, in support of the pillars of the independence of the state and the sovereignty of the people, and on the path of the democratic system, which is the assembly's point of drawing the constitution, we take the following decision in force immediately:

First: We completely abolish the monarchy.

Second: We declare that Tunisia is a republic

Third: We assign the Prime Minister, Mr. Habib Bourguiba, with the duties of the presidency of the republic in its present state, pending the entry into force of the constitution, and we call it the title of President of the Republic of Tunisia.

Fourth: We instruct the government to implement this decision and to take the necessary measures to maintain the republican system. We also instruct the Speaker of the Assembly, the Secretary General of the Assembly's office and the government to report this decision to the private and public.

We issued it in the Palace of Bardo on Thursday at six in the evening on the 26th of Dhu al-Hijjah 1376 and on the 25th of July 1957

Signature: Jallouli Fares

== Aftermath ==
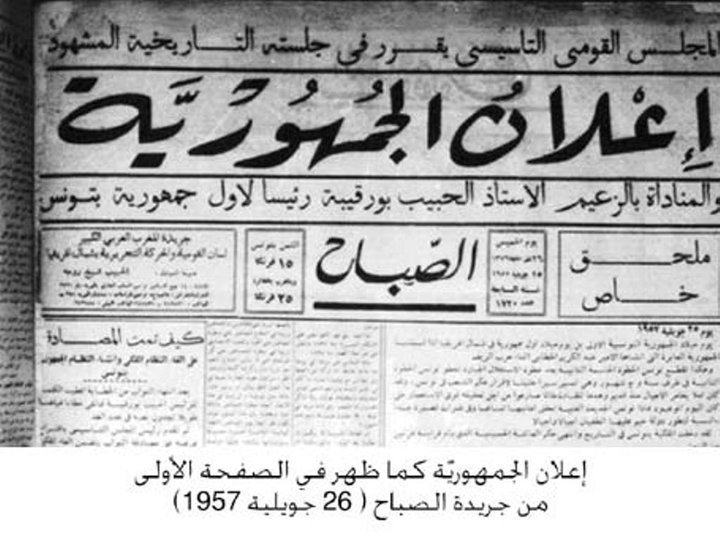
Tunisian newspaper announced the next day the establishment of the republic (in Arabic).

Bourguiba was preoccupied with the reservations of Libya, Morocco and Saudi Arabia, as well as some Western circles, about declaring the republic in Tunisia. In confirmation of this, the ambassador of the Kingdom of Libya left the headquarters of the Constituent Assembly in protest against the declaration of the republic by virtue of the treaty that had bound the two countries during the state visit of the Libyan Prime Minister, Mustafa Ben Halim to Tunisia in the beginning of 1957, and the signing of Bourguiba and Mustafa bin Halim of the Treaty of Brotherhood, Cooperation and Good Neighborliness between Tunisia and Libya on 6 January 1957. On 21 February of the same year, King Saud bin Abdulaziz visited Tunisia and met the King. This prompted Bourguiba to assign the foreign minister to contact the ambassadors of the two countries in Tunisia and to reassure them of the fate of their relations with them.

On the same day of the proclamation of the Republic, a delegation of several personalities was assigned to inform the ousted king of the requirements of the Constituent Assembly's decision and to invite him to comply with it. The delegation included Ali Belhouane, (General Secretary of the National Constituent Assembly), Taïeb Mhiri (Minister of Interior), Ahmed Mestiri (Minister of Justice), Driss Guiga (Director of National Security), Abdelmajid Chaker (member of the political bureau of the party), Ahmed Zaouche (Mayor of Tunis), Tijani Ktari (commander of the National Guard).

'We went into the throne room right away, and without being announced, as we were already expected. Lamine Bey, wearing a jebba and with his hair undressed, stood there, dignified, without saying a word. Belhouane called out in his theatrical voice As-Salamou Alaikum and then read out the resolution of the Constituent Assembly. A photographer had come with us, and wanted to start working, but straight away the King broke his silence. Ah no, not that! he said, making a gesture of refusal, the last reflex of his authority. We did not want to deny the wishes of the old man, or humiliate him further. Then Ali Belhaouane made a gesture of salute with his hand, repeated As-Salamou Alaikum in his stentorian voice, and turned on his heels. As we withdrew, police commissioner Driss Guiga presented himself and advised the fallen ruler of an order from the Minister of the Interior placing him in isolation. In the course of this, hearing the name of his father spoken, the King reacted again, saying Allah Yarhamou (May God save his soul) clearly out loud as he left the room. It was over. The whole thing had not even lasted three minutes.'

The king was taken with his wife Lalla Jeneïna, to be placed with his family under house arrest in the Hashemite Palace in Manouba. In October 1958, the Bey and his wife were transferred to a house in the suburb of Soukra, and he was only released in 1960, to move to live freely in an apartment in Lafayette, with his son, prince Salah Eddine, until his death on 30 September 1962.

== See also ==
- History of modern Tunisia
- List of beys of Tunis
- Husainid dynasty
- Makhzen (Tunisia)
- Beylik of Tunis
