= Order of the Republic (Tunisia) =

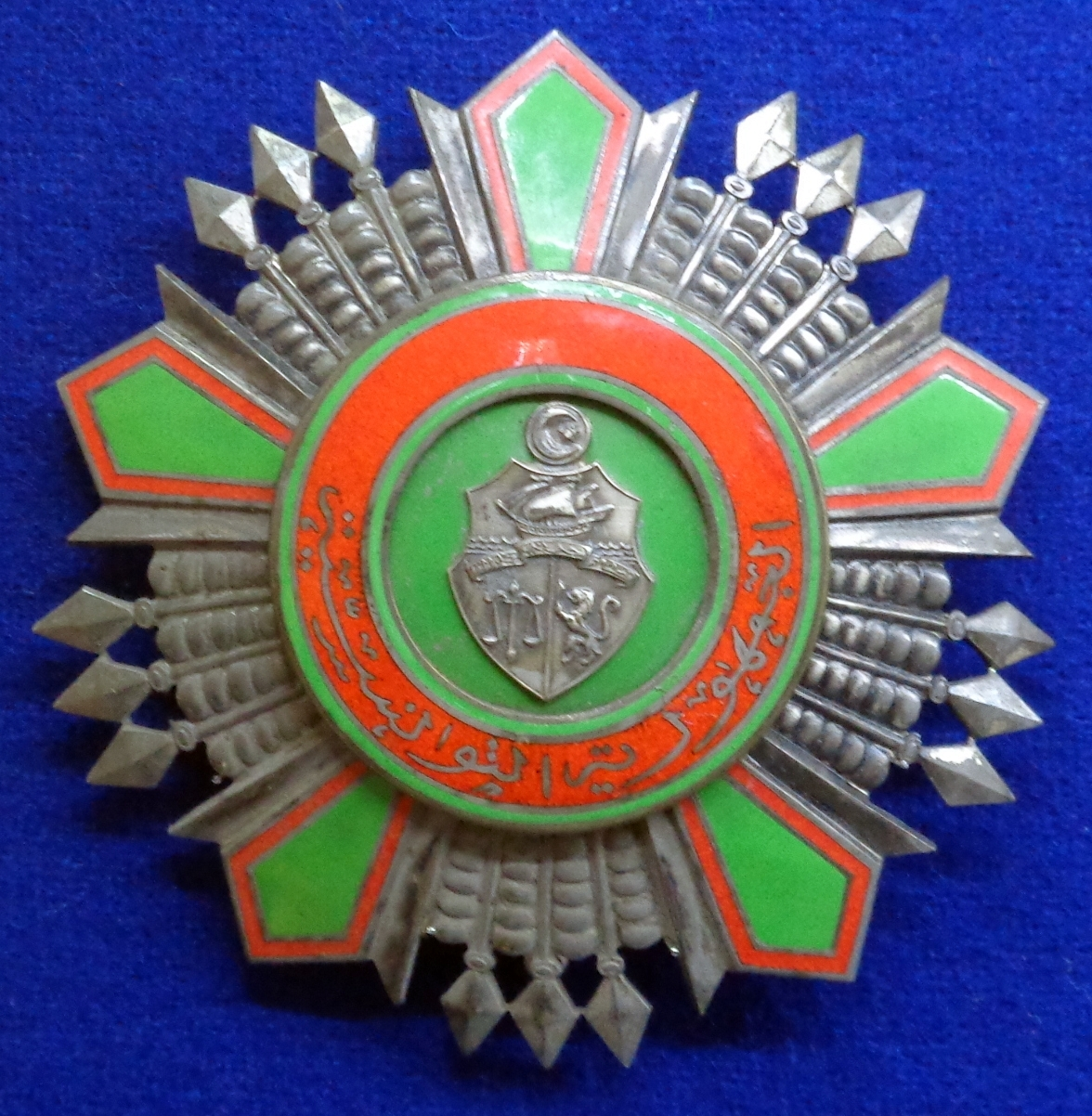

Awarded by The President of The Republic of Tunisia
- Established: 16 March 1959
- Ribbon
- Status: Currently constituted
- Grand Master: President of Tunisia
- Grades: Grand Cordon; 1st Class; 2nd Class; 3rd Class; 4th Class

Precedence
- Next (higher): Order of Independence
- Next (lower): National Order of Merit

The Order of the Republic is an order of Tunisia, founded 16 March 1959.

== Some major recipients ==
=== Grand Cordon ===
==== National ====
- Mohamed Ennaceur
- Beji Caid Essebsi

==== Foreign ====
- Algeria: Abdelaziz Bouteflika
- Argentina: Carlos Menem
- Egypt: Gamal Abdel Nasser
- Egypt: Anwar Sadat
- Egypt: Hosni Mubarak
- Egypt: Taha Hussein
- Egypt: Umm Kulthum
- Ethiopia: Haile Selassie
- France: Jacques Chirac
- France: François Hollande
- France: Emmanuel Macron
- Italy: Giorgio Napolitano
- Japan: Akihito
- Jordan: King Abdullah II
- Jordan: Princess Muna, Princess Mother
- Morocco: Abd el-Krim (1960)
- Morocco: King Mohammed VI (Grand Cordon 1987; Collar 2014)
- Morocco: Moulay Hassan, Crown Prince of Morocco (2014)
- Morocco: Prince Moulay Rachid of Morocco (2014)
- Netherlands: Beatrix of the Netherlands
- Palestine: Yasser Arafat
- Palestine: Mahmoud Abbas
- Saudi Arabia: Prince Al-Waleed bin Talal
- Saudi Arabia: Prince Sultan bin Salman Al Saud (1985)
- Saudi Arabia: Mohammed bin Salman (2018)
- Saudi Arabia: Salman of Saudi Arabia (2019)
- South Africa: Nelson Mandela
- Senegal: Léopold Sédar Senghor
- Spain: Juan Carlos I
- Sweden: King Carl XVI Gustaf
- Turkey: Recep Tayyip Erdoğan (2017)
- United Kingdom: Elizabeth II
- United Kingdom: Prince Philip, Duke of Edinburgh

=== 1st Class ===
==== National ====
- Mohamed Habib Gherab
- Kamel Morjane
- Mohamed Talbi
- Hichem Djait

==== Foreign ====
- Algeria: Djamila Bouhired
- Algeria: Mohamed Belhocine
- Egypt: Amr Moussa
- Denmark: Princess Benedikte
- Sweden: Crown Princess Victoria, Duchess of Västergötland

=== 2nd Class ===
- Serbia: Milica Čubrilo
- France: Benoît Puga
- Tunisia: Yadh Ben Achour
- Egypt: Ahmed Zewail
