= Carthage Royal Palace =

Former beylical Palace in Carthage, Tunisia

Coordinates: 36°51′07″N 10°19′57″E

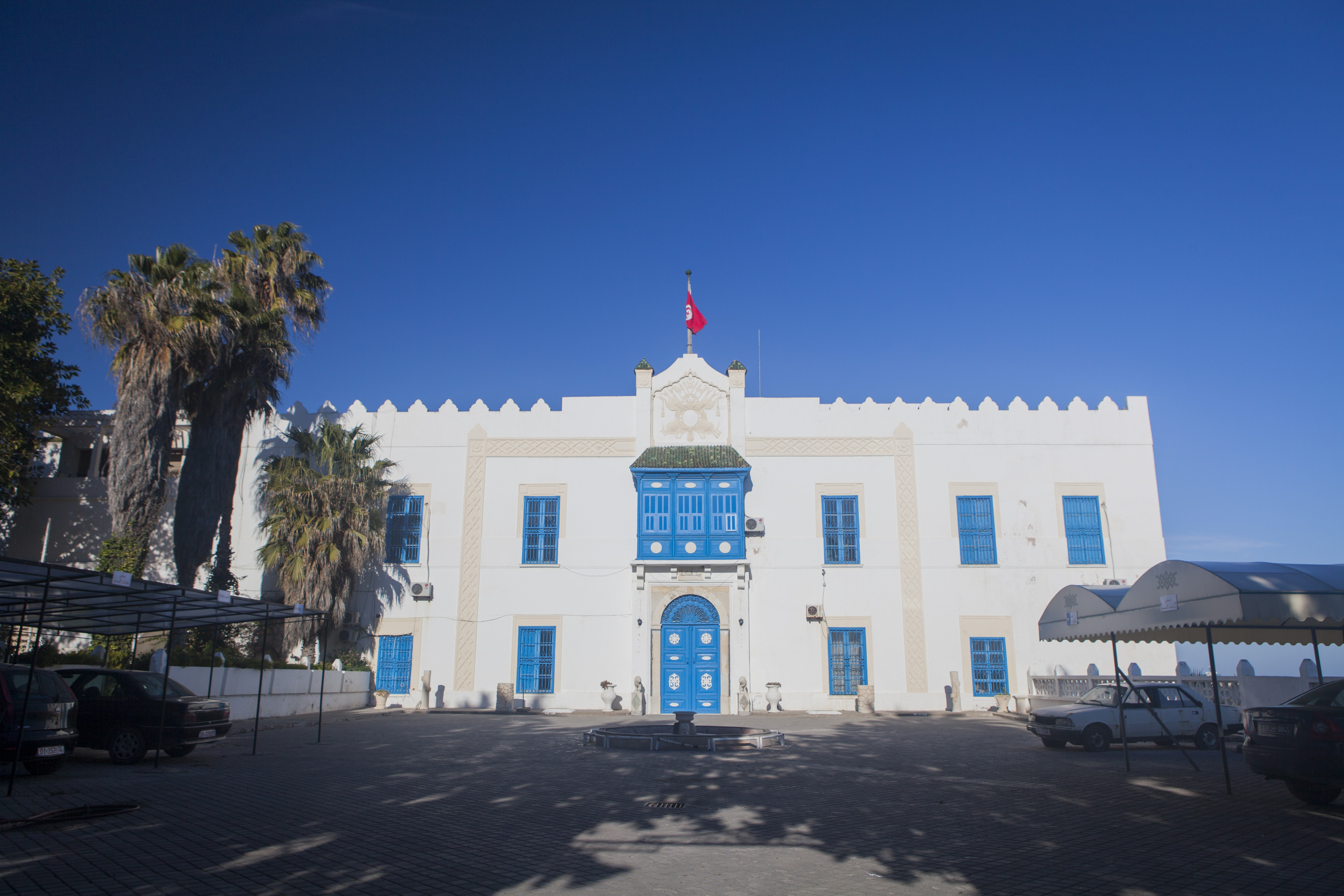
Zarrouk palace, the former Royal Palace of Carthage

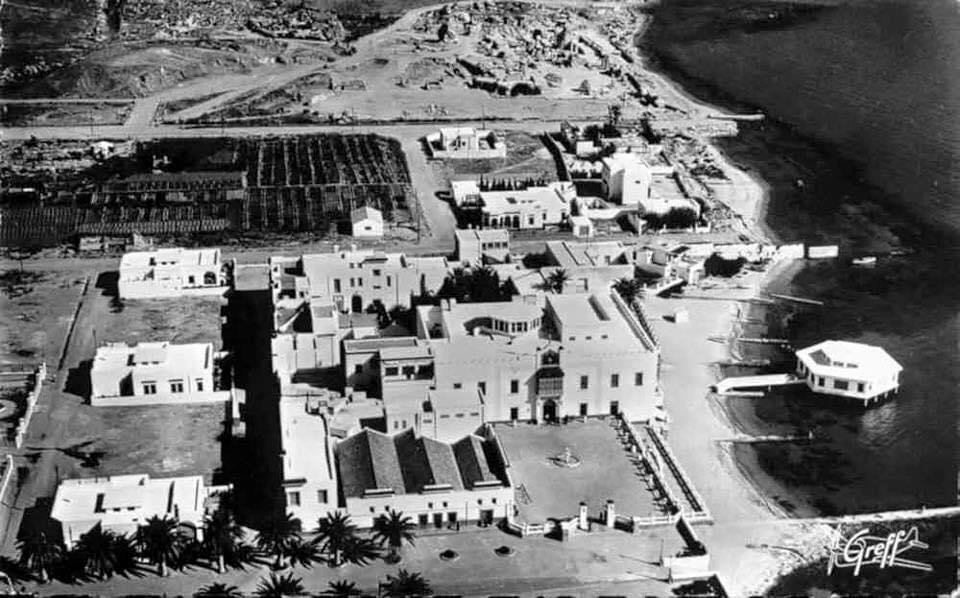
Carthage Royal Palace

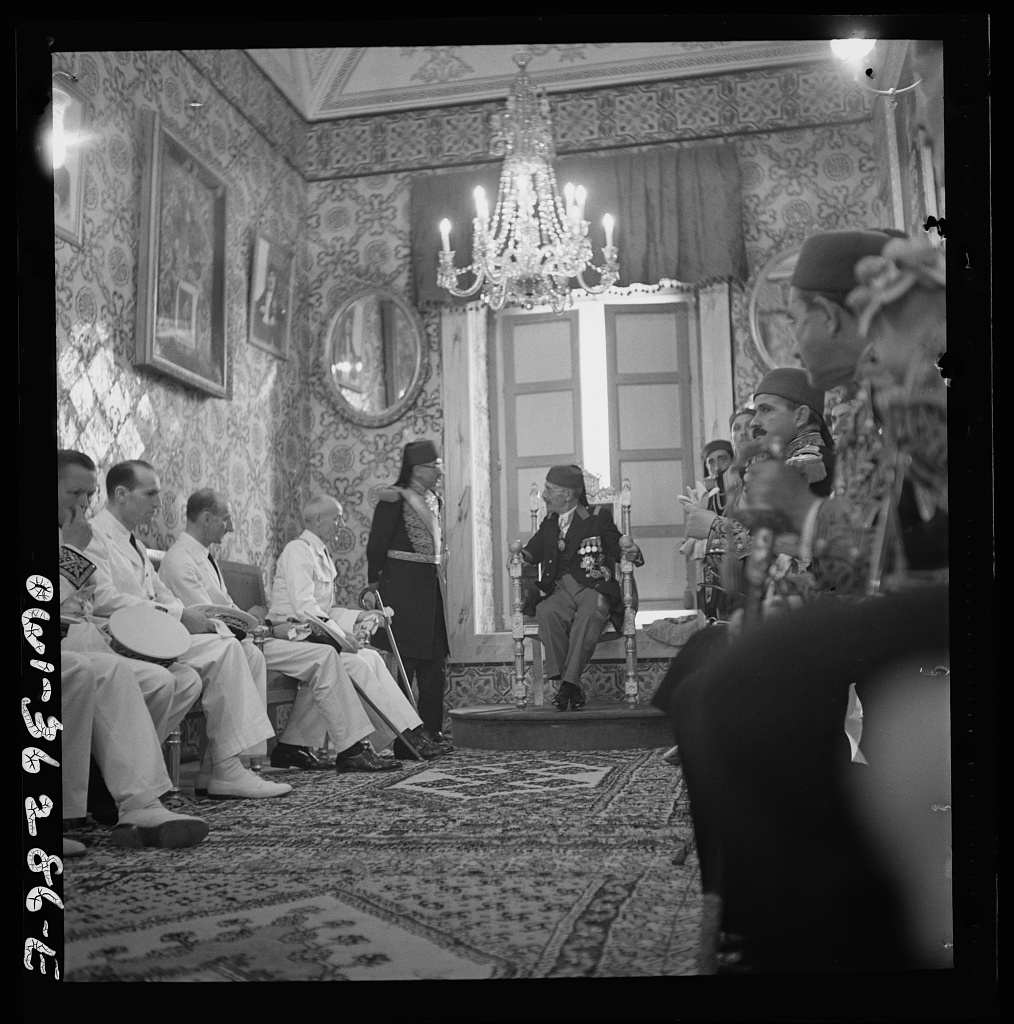
General Mast paying his respects to the King

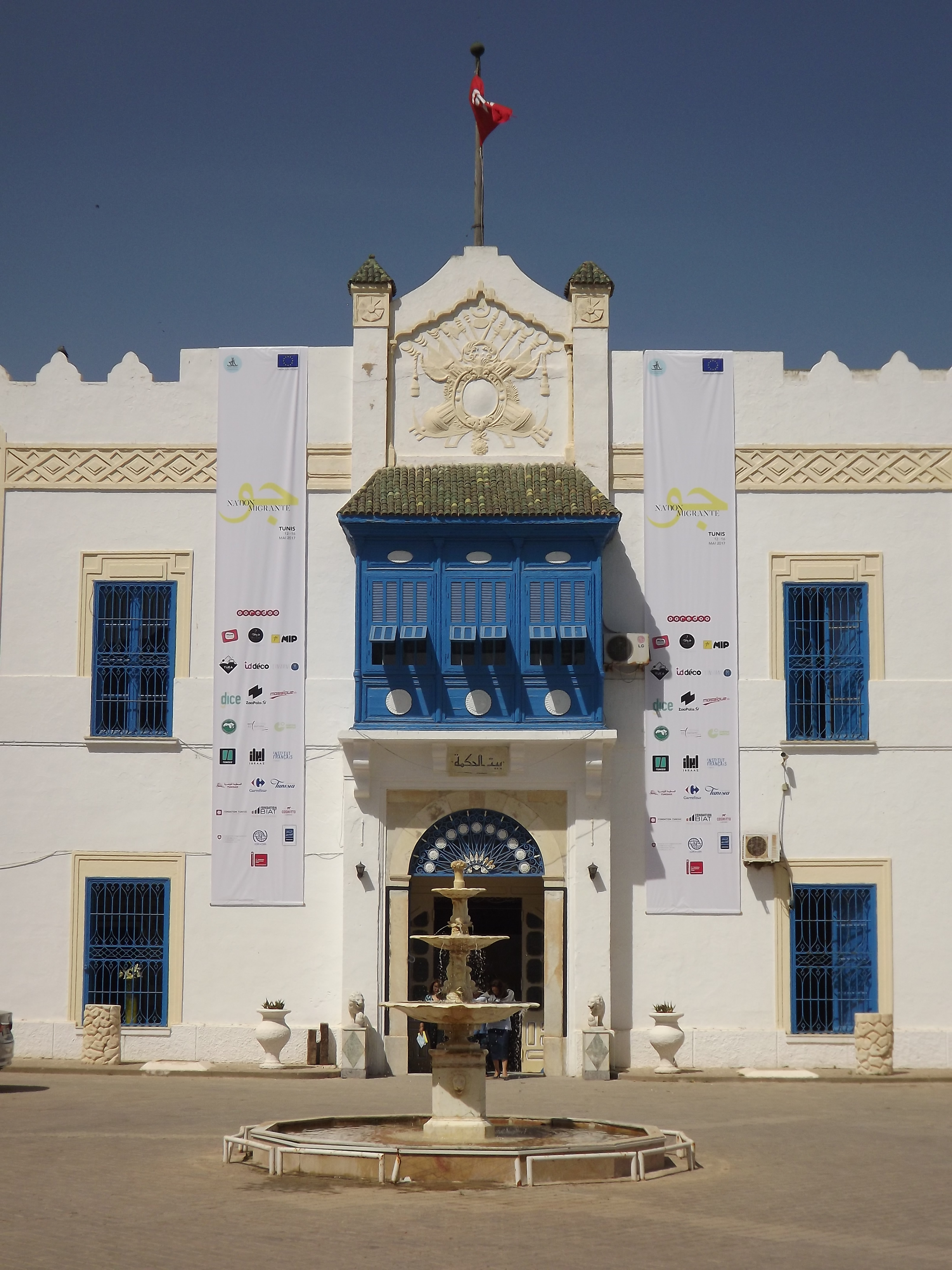
Entrance to the palace

The Royal Palace of Carthage or nowadays Zarrouk Palace was a residence of the Tunisian Kings, in Carthage, Tunisia. It was the last Royal Palace in the Kingdom of Tunisia before the declaration of the Republic in 1957.

== History ==
General Ahmed Zarrouk, son in law of was renowned for his actions during the Mejba Revolt in 1864. Around 1860, he constructed a palace in Carthage, which he used as his residence. The General's son expanded the estate around the palace. In 1922, the palace was acquired by the Bey of Tunis, Muhammad VI al-Habib (1858–1929), where he spent his last years by the sea. In 1943, Muhammad VIII al-Amin (1881–1962) choose it as one of his main royal palaces, making multiple transformations and enhancements.

On 31 July 1954, Muhammad VIII al-Amin welcomed the new French prime minister, Pierre Mendès France in his Carthage palace, who announced internal autonomy for Tunisia.

After the monarchy was abolished in 1957, the palace was confiscated by the Tunisian state. It was initially used as the first headquarters for the Tunisian Office of Handicrafts and later for the Tunisian Institute of Archaeology and Art, before being abandoned. It became the seat of the Tunisian Academy of Sciences, Letters, and Arts (Beit al-Hikma Foundation) in 1983.

On 21 January 2021, the palace was classified as a historical monument.

== Literature ==
- Revault, Jacques (1974). Palais et résidences d'été de la région de Tunis (XVIe-XIXe siècles) (in French). Paris: Editions du Centre National de la Recherche Scientifique. pp. 414–426. ISBN 2-222-01622-3.
