= Mohamed Habib Gherab =

Tunisian diplomat

Mohamed H. Gherab

Personal details
- Born: 8 May 1926 Tunis, Tunisia
- Died: 17 March 2011 (aged 84) Tunis, Tunisia

Mohamed Habib Gherab (8 May 1926 – 17 March 2011) (Arabic: محمد الحبيب غراب) was a United Nations Under Secretary-General, Tunisian diplomat, and senior government official.

== Education ==
Amb. Gherab was educated at Sadiki College in Tunis and is a graduate of the Faculty of Law of Paris.

== Career ==
After joining the Neo Destour Party as a young militant for the independence of Tunisia, in 1955 he became a member of the cabinet of Mongi Slim, the Interior Minister in the government of Prime Minister Tahar Ben Ammar as it negotiated the process that led to the effective independence of Tunisia on 20 March 1956. Gherab later became the only chief of staff to Taieb Mehiri, the first Interior Minister of independent Tunisia during his entire tenure from 1956 until 1965. President Habib Bourguiba appointed him Ambassador to Spain from 1965 to 1967 and Ambassador to the Soviet Union from 1981 to 1987, where he became the longest serving Ambassador of Tunisia. In between his two ambassadorial terms, he served as the first high-ranking Tunisian in the cabinet of the United Nations Secretary-General when Secretary-General U Thant appointed him in 1969 as the Assistant Secretary-General, Director of Personnel of the United Nations. UN Secretary-General Kurt Waldheim confirmed him in the same office from 1972 until 1979 when he was promoted to the rank of Under Secretary-General of the United Nations and appointed the first Secretary-General of the United Nations Conference on New and Renewable Sources of Energy from 1979 to 1981.

=== Criticisms ===
As director of personnel, Gherab was accused of appointing un- and under-qualified applicants from Arab countries, discriminating against women in hiring, and hiring men for high-salaried positions where lower-paid female employees did the majority of the work.

== Honours ==
Amb. Gherab was the recipient of a number of Tunisian and foreign honours, including the Grand Cross of the Order of Isabel La Catolica of Spain, the Grand Officier of the Order of the Republic of Tunisia, and the Grand Officier of the Wissam Alaouite of the Kingdom of Morocco. He was a Commandeur of the francophone Order of La Pléiade.

== Personal life ==
Amb. Gherab married Fawzia Ladjimi on 22 June 1958. They have three children: Habib, Fawzy and Noha.
