= Husain Bey, Crown Prince of Tunisia =

Husain III De Tunisia
- King of Tunisia
- Period: 30 September 1962 – 22 April 1969
- Predecessor: Muhammad VIII
- Successor: Mustafa II
- Born: April 22, 1893; Sidi Bou Said, Regency of Tunis
- Died: April 22, 1969 (aged 76); Sidi Bou Said, Tunisia
- Spouse: Lalla Aicha
- Issue: Sidi Ali Bey; Lalla Husn al-Ujud; Sidi Murad Bey; Sidi Muhammad al-Afif Bey; Sidi Muhammad Bey
Names
- Husain Bey Gouta
- Dynasty: Husainid Dynasty
- Father: Muhammad V al-Nasir
- Mother: Lalla Husn ul-Ujud
- Religion: Sunni Islam

Husain Bey Gouta, Crown Prince of Tunisia (22 April 1893 – 22 April 1969) was the titular head of the Husainid Dynasty. He was the third son of Muhammad V al-Nasir, Bey of Tunis, by his second wife, Lalla Husn ul-Ujud, from 1906 until 1922.

== Biography ==
Husain Bey Gouta was born in Sidi Bou Said. He was educated at the Prytanée National Militaire school situated in the city of La Flèche in western France. At the time of attending the Prytanée National Militaire school, Tunisia was a French protectorate.

On 1 October 1955, Husain Bey Gouta was invested as the heir apparent of the Beylik of Tunis, receiving the title Bey al-Mahalla, meaning Bey of the Camp. This is a title used for the most senior member of the Beylical family after the reigning Bey. In addition to becoming Bey al-Mahalla, he also became a Lieutenant General in the Beylical Army. Following Tunisia's independence from France on 20 March 1956, Husain Bey received the new title of Crown Prince following its independence as a Kingdom.

Husain Bey Gouta's chances of ascending the throne came to an end on 25 July 1957, when the prime minister, Habib Bourguiba, usurped power and abolished the monarchy. Following the death of King Muhammad VIII al-Amin on 30 September 1962, Husain Bey Gouta succeeded as head of the Husainid Dynasty as Head of the Royal House of Tunisia, and of the Nishan ad-Dam, Nishan al-Ahad al-Aman, and the Nishan al-Iftikhar and remained so until his death, when he was succeeded by Prince Mustafa Bey Gouta.

Husain Bey, Crown Prince of Tunisia
- Royal Family of Tunisia

He was Sovereign and Grand Master of the Nishan al-Ahad al-Aman, Nishan ad-Dam, and Nishan al-Iftikhar.

He was decorated with the Nishan al-Ahad al-Aman al-Murassa on 1 October 1955, Nishan ad-Dam, Grand Cross of the Nishan al-Iftikhar, Grand Officer of the Order of the Legion of Honour of France, the Sharifian Order of Al-Alaoui of Morocco, etc.

He died in Sidi Bou Said. Some sources stated he died in October 1964.

== Marriage and children ==
Husain Bey Gouta was married on 22 July 1914, at the Dar al-Taj Palace in La Marsa as his only wife to Lalla Aisha Maria, the daughter of Si Ahmad bin Abdullah Maria, an Italian convert to Islam, and his wife Princess Traki, eldest daughter of Sidi Husain Bey, Bey al-Taula. Husain and Aisha had five children:

- Prince Ali Bey Gouta (1915–1945).
- Princess Husn al-Ujud Gouta (born 1918).
- Prince Murad Bey Gouta (1919–2005).
- Prince Muhammad al-Afif Bey Gouta (1926–1985).
- Prince Muhammad Bey Gouta (1934–1934).

== Ancestry ==
Ancestors of Husain Bey, Crown Prince of Tunisia

16. Mahmud bin Muhammad
8. Al-Husayn II bin Mahmud
17. Lalla Amina Beya
4. Muhammad II bin al-Husayn
2. Muhammad V al-Nasir
1. Husain Bey, Crown Prince of Tunisia
3. Lalla Husn ul-Ujud

Preceded by Prince Muhammad as-Sadiq, Bey al-Mahalla	Bey al-Mahalla; 1955–1956	Independence from France
New title Previously Bey al-Mahalla	Crown Prince of Tunisia; 1956–1957	Monarchy abolished
Preceded by King Muhammad VIII al-Amin	Head of the Husainid Dynasty; 1962-1964/9	Succeeded by Prince Mustafa Bey
