= Order of Ouissam Alaouite =

Moroccan royal decoration

Order of Ouissam Alaouite الوسام العلوي الشريف
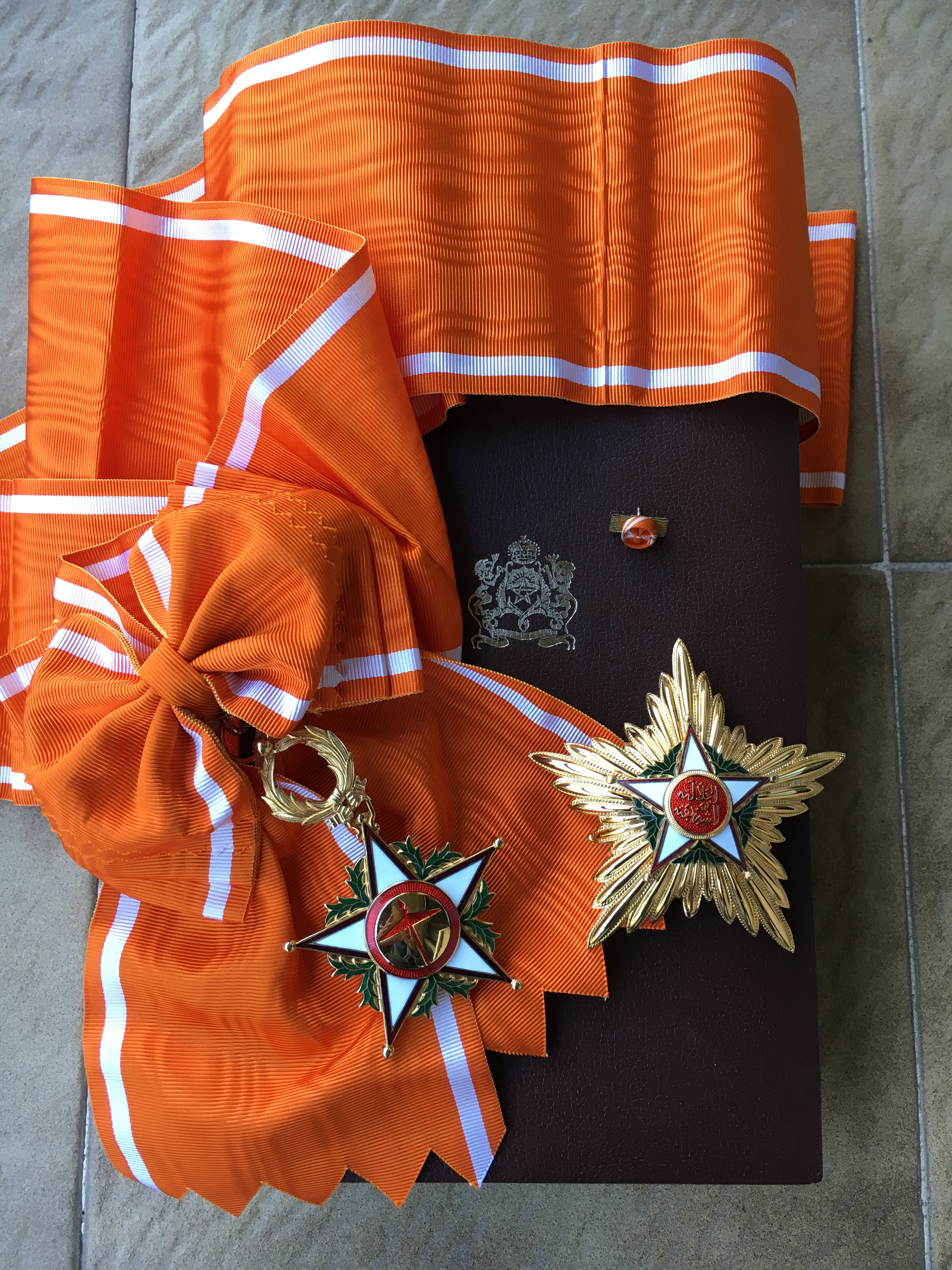
- Grand Cordon Extraordinary grade (golden star) set of the Order

Awarded by The King of Morocco
- Established: 11 January 1913
- Royal house: Alaouite
- Religious affiliation: Islam
- Awarded for: Displaying heroism in combat or contributing meritorious service to the Moroccan state
- Status: Currently constituted
- Sovereign: King Mohammed VI
- Grades: Grand Cordon; Grand Officer; Commander; Officer; Knight

Precedence
- Next (higher): Order of Muhammad
- Next (lower): Order of Fidelity
- Ribbon bar of the Order

The Order of Ouissam Alaouite (Arabic: الوسام العلوي الشريف) or the Sharifian Order of Al-Alaoui is a military decoration of Morocco which is bestowed by the King of Morocco upon those civilians and military officers who have displayed heroism in combat or have contributed meritorious service to the Moroccan state. The decoration was established on 11 January 1913 in replacement of the Order of Ouissam Hafidien. It is awarded in five classes: Grand Cordon (Grand Cordon), Grand Officer (Grand Officier), Commander (Commandeur), Officer (Officier) and Knight (Chevalier).

The Order of Ouissam Alaouite is similar to the Legion of Merit, awarded by the United States military.

== History ==
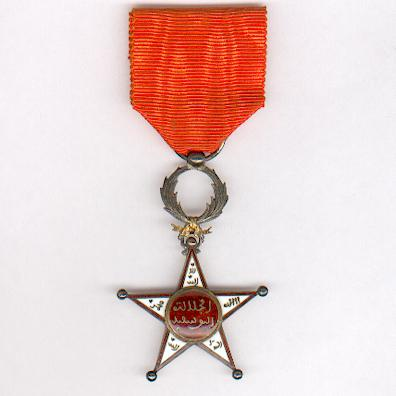
The 1913 to 1934 Knight of the Order of Ouissan Alaouite Medal.

The establishment of the Order was a significant result of the establishment of full French influence in Moroccoas a result of the activities of French banks, and the Order, similar to the of the Légion d'Honneur in Paris., was included in the system of French colonial awards.

The ribbon of the order during this period was a shade of orange or pumpkin-coloured. In 1934, a white stripe was added on each side of the ribbon.

During the Second World War, the Order of Ouissam Alaouite was awarded frequently to United States military personnel who had participated in the planning and execution of Operation Torch, the invasion of French Morocco. Morocco was a protectorate of France from 1912 to 1956, and the decoration was bestowed frequently on French military officers during that period.

After Moroccan independence in 1956, the Alawid Order became a prerogative of the Alawid King and his heirs.

The Order continues through the present day, the original medal and the 1934's ribbon unchanged.

Ribbons (1913–1934)
Knight	Officer	Commander	Grand Officer	Grand Cordon

Ribbons (1934–present)
Knight	Officer	Commander	Grand Officer	Grand Cordon

== Recipients ==
=== Grand cordon ===
1916

- Henri Gouraud: acting French resident-general in Morocco.

1922

- Laurent Eynac: undersecretary of state for aeronautics.

1926

- José Sanjurjo: High Commissioner of Spain to Morocco.

1929

- Hédi Lakhoua: Tunisian Minister of the Pen.

1930

- Louis-Athanase Dubois: French counter admiral.
- André Maginot: French minister of war.
- Jacques-Louis Dumesnil: French naval minister.
- Louis Rollin: French minister of merchant marine.
- Léon Baréty: undersecretary of state for the budget.

1931

- Luciano López Ferrer: Spanish high commissioner in Tétouan

1941

- Charles Platon: French admiral.

1943

- Dwight D. Eisenhower: US General.
- George C. Marshall: Chief of Staff of the United States Army.
- George S. Patton: US General.

1945

- Jean de Lattre de Tassigny: French general.
- Antoine Béthouart: French general.
- Émile Bollaert: regional commissioner of the Republic in Strasbourg
- Georges Bidault: chief of the French delegation to the San Francisco Conference.

1946

- Edmond Michelet: French army minister.
- Philippe Leclerc de Hauteclocque: French general.
- Vincent Auriol: President of France.

1950

- De Blesson: general delegate at the residence.

1952

- Jacques Gavini: French secretary of state for the Navy.
- Roger Duchet: French Minister of Posts, Telegraphs, and Telephones.

1953

- Matthew Ridgway: Supreme Allied Commander Europe.
- Louis Christiaens: secretary of state for aeronautics.

1954

- William Fechteler: American admiral
- Carleton H. Wright: American Rear Admiral.
- Georges Hutin: secretary general of the protectorate.
- Ludovic Chancel: general delegate at the residence.
- Jacques Chevallier: French secretary of state for war.

1955

- Gilbert Grandval: French resident-general in Morocco.
- André-Louis Dubois: French resident-general in Morocco.
- Pierre Boyer de Latour du Moulin: French resident-general in Morocco.
- Jacques-Louis Murtin: air commander in Morocco.
- Burgund: French general and senior commander of French troops in Morocco
- Hassan El Bakouri: Egyptian Minister of Wakfs.
- Émile Roche: president of the French Economic Council.
- Si Sayed Hassan Ibrahim: minister of state of Yemen.

1956

- Rafael García Valiño: high commissioner of Spain to Morocco.

1957

- Eduardo González-Gallarza: Spanish Air minister.
- Habib Bourguiba: President of Tunisia.
- Giorgio La Pira: Mayor of Florence.
- Louis Massignon: French Islamologist.

1962

- Roger Seydoux: French ambassador to Morocco.

1970

- Jacques Gillet: French doctor.

1980

- David C. Jones: chairman of the Joint Chiefs of Staff.

1987

- Walter Jesser: German ambassador to Morocco.

1988

- William Henry Draper III: administrator of the United Nations Development Programme.
- Aníbal Cavaco Silva: Prime Minister of Portugal.

1990

- Colin Powell: chairman of the Joint Chiefs of Staff.

1992

- Jacques Lanxade: chief of staff of the French armies.

1993

- Édouard Balladur: Prime Minister of France.

1994

- Philippe Morillon: French general.

1996

- Helmut Kohl: Chancellor of Germany.
- Philippe Séguin: President of the National Assembly of France.
- José María Aznar: president of the Spanish government.

1997

- Lionel Jospin: French Prime Minister.

1999

- James Gustave Speth: Administrator of the United Nations Development Program.
- Atal Bihari Vajpayee: Prime Minister of India

2000

- Sepp Blatter: president of FIFA
- Nicole Fontaine: President of the European Parliament

2001

- Doudou Sala Diop: ambassador of Senegal to Morocco.
- Suleiman Ibrahim All Marjan:: ambassador of Kuwait to Morocco.
- Indrajit Singh Rathor: ambassador of India to Morocco.
- Jordi Pujol: President of the Government of Catalonia.

2002

- Michel de Bonnecorse: French ambassador to Morocco.
- Husein Naci Akinci: Turkish ambassador to Morocco.

2003

- James Wolfensohn: president of the World Bank Group
- Allan Wagner Tizon: Minister of Foreign Relations of Peru.
- Mahmoud Ben Ali Ben Mohamed Al Rahma: ambassador of Oman to Morocco.
- Isabel Allende: President of the Chilean Chamber of Deputies.
- Moustapha Hassan Moustapha: ambassador of Lebanon to Morocco.

2004

- Mohamed Daoudia: Jordanian ambassador to Morocco.
- Khalifa bin Salman Al Khalifa: prime minister of Bahrain
- Edith Lucie Bongo Ondimba: first lady of Gabon.
- Ántero Flores-Aráoz: President of the Congress of the Republic of Peru.

2005

- Wu Bangguo: Chairman of the Standing Committee of the National People's Congress
- Boualem Bessayah: Algerian ambassador to Morocco.
- Cristina Funes-Noppen: Ambassador of Belgium to Morocco.
- Wajih Hassan Ali Kassem (Abou Marouane): Palestinian ambassador to Morocco.

2006

- Óscar Maúrtua: Minister of Foreign Relations of Perú.
- Siriwat Suthigasame: Ambassador of Thailand to Morocco.
- Mamadou Saliou Sylla: Ambassador of Guinea to Morocco.

2007

- Ahmed Ben Bella: former President of Algeria.
- Mærsk Mc-Kinney Møller: chairperson of Maersk.
- John Danilovich: chief executive officer of the Millennium Challenge Corporation
- Carlos Ghosn: chairman and CEO of Renault and Nissan.
- Issa Hamad Abou Chihab: Ambassador of UAE to Morocco.

2008

- Dominique Strauss-Kahn: Managing Director of the International Monetary Fund
- Armand De Decker: president of the Belgian Chamber of Representatives.
- Arne Aasheim: ambassador of Norway to Morocco.
- Alexandre Tokovinine: ambassador of Russia to Morocco.
- Mauricio Torbay Hachem: Venezuelan businessman.
- Carlos Alberto Simas Magalhaes: ambassador of Brazil to Morocco.

2009

- Thomas Riley: ambassador of the United States to Morocco.
- Cheyakh Ould Ely: ambassador of Mauritania to Morocco.
- Saleh Bekkari: ambassador of Tunisia to Morocco.
- Jean-François Thibault: ambassador of France to Morocco.
- Kobina Annan: ambassador of Ghana to Morocco.
- Hassan Abdelkader: ambassador of Palestine to Morocco.
- Georgios Georgountzos: ambassador of Greece to Morocco.
- Kadri Fathi Abdelmottalab: ambassador of Egypt to Morocco.
- Vercauteren Drubbel: ambassador of Belgium to Morocco.
- Salah Mohamed Saoud Al-Baïjane: ambassador of Kuwait to Morocco.
- Mohamad Ben Abdellah Al Farissi: ambassador of Oman to Morocco.
- Adolfo Zaldivar: president of the Chilean senate.
- Sigmund Sternberg: president of the Three Religions Forum.
- Paulette Brisepierre: honorary president of the France-Morocco Friendship Group.

2010

- Sepp Blatter: president of FIFA.
- Alberto de Núnez: ambassador of Argentine to Morocco.
- Robert Zoellick: President of the World Bank.

2011

- Issa Hayatou: president of CAF.
- Al Waleed bin Talal Al Saud: Saudi prince.
- Vasile Gheorge Popovici: former ambassador of Romania to Morocco.
- Luis Planas: ambassador of Spain to Morocco.
- Ibou Ndaye: former ambassador of Senegal to Morocco.
- Charles Aké Tchimou: former ambassador of Ivory Coast to Morocco

2012

- Ibrahim Traore: ambassador of Burkina Faso to Morocco
- François Banga Eboumi: ambassador of Gabon to Morocco
- Timothy Colin Morris: ambassador of United Kingdom to Morocco.
- Mamadouba Diabaté: ambassador of Guinea to Morocco
- Bruno Joubert: ambassador of France to Morocco
- Sakr Ben Moubarak Al-Mansouri: ambassador of Qatar to Morocco.
- Fayçal Al Choubaki: former ambassador of Jordan to Morocco.
- Joao Rosa Là: former ambassador of Portugal to Morocco

2013

- Khaled Ben Salmane Ben Ahmed Al Khalifa: ambassador of Bahrain to Morocco.
- Ahmed Hassan Sobh: ambassador of Palestine to Morocco.
- Boris Bolotine: ambassador of Russia to Morocco.
- Shlomo Amar: Chief Rabbi.
- Jean-Luc Bodson: ambassador of Belgium to Morocco.
- Clifford Nii Amon Kotey: ambassador of Ghana to Morocco.
- Moussa Ben Hamdan Attaai: ambassador of Oman to Morocco.
- Alberto Navarro: ambassador of Spain to Morocco.

2014

- Mohammed Ben Abdurahman Al Becher: ambassador of Saudi Arabia to Morocco.
- Fred Harald Nomme: ambassador of Norway to Morocco.
- Toumani Djimé Diallo: former ambassador of Mali to Morocco
- Jack Lang: president of the Arab World Institute in Paris and former French Minister of Culture.
- Tosari Widjaja: ambassador of Indonesia to Morocco.
- Kundalee Prachimdhit: former ambassador of Thailand to Morocco.

2015

- Bertrand Louis: ambassador of Switzerland to Morocco.
- Witold Spirydowicz: ambassador of Poland to Morocco.
- Christina Harttil: ambassador of Finland to Morocco.
- Charles Fries: ambassador of France to Morocco.
- Antonio Sozzo: apostolic nuncio in Rabat.

2016

- Al Asri Said Ahmed Al Dahiri: UAE Ambassador to Morocco.
- Michaela Froňková: ambassador of Czech to Morocco.
- Pierre Bergé: president of Majorelle Garden Foundation
- José Luis Rodriguez Zapatero: former Prime Minister of Spain
- Raymond L. Conner: president of Boeing
- Simona Ioan: ambassador of Romania to Morocco

2019

- Tarek Aliev: former Azerbaijani ambassador to Morocco.
- Boriana Ivanova Simeonova: Bulgarian Ambassador to Morocco.
- Abdu Razzaq Guy Kambogo: former ambassador of Gabon to Morocco
- Abdullah Falah Bin Abdullah Al Dosari: Qatari Ambassador to Morocco.
- Jean-François Girault: French Ambassador to Morocco.
- Ousmane Amadou Sy: ambassador of Mali to Morocco

2020

- Sladjana Prica Tavciovska: former Serbian ambassador to Morocco
- Maria Rita da Franca Sousa Ferro Levy Gomes: former Portuguese ambassador to Morocco.

2021

- Fernando Affonso Collor de Mello: former Brazilian president
- Óscar Rodolfo Benítez Estragó: former ambassador of Paraguay to Morocco
- Soultana Leila Houssain: former ambassador of Bangladesh to Morocco

2023

- Cheikh Saeed bin Mohammed bin Ali Albarami: former Omani ambassador to Morocco.
- Klaus Kogeler: former Austrian ambassador to Morocco
- Julio Bitelli: former Brazilian ambassador to Morocco.
- Vito Rallo: former apostolic nuncio in Rabat.

2024

- Nell Stewart: former Canadian ambassador to Morocco
- Idrissa Traoré: former ambassador of Ivory Coast to Morocco
- Astanah Abdul Aziz: former Malaysian ambassador to Morocco.

=== Grand officer ===
1920

- Sabino Rinella: Consul General of Italy in Tangier.
- Khelil Bouhageb: President of the Municipality of Tunis.
- Chedly El Okby: Governor of Cap-Bon in Nabeul.

1926

- Duvernoy: Secretary General of the Protectorate.
- Bertrand: French General and Commander of the Coastal Troops.

1927

- Léon Champion: General Councillor of the Seine Department and Mayor of Maisons-Alfort.

1930

- Henri Gamard: French Member of Parliament.

1932

- Bénazet: Director of Indigenous Affairs
- Colombani: Director of Public Health and Hygiene.

1933

- Ernesto Burzagli: Commander-in-Chief of the First Italian Squadron.

1952

- Soulmagnon: Director of Agriculture, Trade and Forestry.
- Nguyễn Văn Thiệu: Minister of National Defense of Vietnam.

1954

- Christian Fouchet: French Minister of Tunisian and Moroccan Affairs.

1955

- Lamy: Finance Director
- Jean Marin: Director General of Agence France-Presse.
- Germaine Peyroles: Vice President of the National Assembly.

1956

- Jean de Lipkowski: French deputy.

1999

- Charles Josselin: Minister Delegate for Cooperation and Francophonie.

2002

- Mohamed Amamou: Secretary General of the Arab Maghreb Union.
- Abdeljabar Omar Addouri: Iraqi Ambassador to Morocco.

2004

- Mohammed bin Hammam: President of the Asian Football Confederation.

2006

- José Manuel de Carvalho Lameiras: Portuguese Ambassador to Morocco.

2007

- Akin Algan: Turkish Ambassador to Morocco.
- Christine Lagarde: French Minister of Economy, Finance and Employment.

2008

- Bernard Rudolph Bot: former Dutch Minister of Foreign Affairs.
- Hans Dijkstal: former Dutch Deputy Prime Minister and Interior Minister.
- Sjoerd Leenstra: Dutch Ambassador to Morocco
- Charles Gray: British Ambassador to Morocco.
- Eleonora Urbanova: Czech Ambassador to Morocco.

2009

- Brice Hortefeux: French Minister of Labor, Social Relations, Family, Solidarity and the city.
- Bruno Dethomas: Head of the European Commission delegation to Morocco.
- Yahia Abdeljalil Mahmoud: Sudanese Ambassador to Morocco.
- Gong Yuanxing: Chinese Ambassador to Morocco.
- Oswaldo Rivera: former minister and director of the cultural institute of Providencia.

2010

- Haruko Hirose: Japanese Ambassador to Morocco.
- Rachida Dati: former French Minister of Justice
- Raymond Safia: former inspector general of the French national police.
- Othmane Ben Samine: Malaysian Ambassador to Morocco

2012

- Rafii Ben Achour: Tunisian Ambassador to Morocco.

2013

- Santiago Marcovich:former Peruvian ambassador to Morocco.
- Malcolm Hoenlein: Vice President of the Conference of Presidents of Major Jewish Organizations of the United States
- Mautner Markhof: former Austrian ambassador to Morocco
- Alberto Navarro: former Spanish ambassador to Morocco.

2014

- Navanethem Pillay: United Nations High Commissioner for Human Rights.

2016

- Chafik Hajji: Tunisian Ambassador to Morocco.
- Alex Geiger Soffia: former Chilean ambassador to Morocco.
- Ronald Gerard Strikker: Dutch Ambassador to Morocco.
- Jose Gutierrez Maxwell: former Argentine ambassador to Morocco.

2017

- Dwight. L. Bush: U.S. Ambassador to Morocco
- Carlos Manuel Alfredo Velasco Menidiola: former Peruvian ambassador to Morocco.
- Carlos Charme Silva: former Chilean ambassador to Morocco.
- Pham Truong Giang: former Vietnamese ambassador to Morocco.
- Luis Maria Linde de Castro: governor of the Bank of Spain.

2018

- Zvonimir Frka Petesic: former Croatian ambassador to Morocco.′
- Suphorn Pholmani: former Thai ambassador to Morocco

2019

- Marek Ziolkowski: former Polish ambassador to Morocco.
- Anne Vasara: former Finnish ambassador to Morocco

2020

- Tran Quoc Thuy: Vietnamese Ambassador to Morocco.
- Yeshi Tamrat Bitew: former Ethiopian ambassador to Morocco.
- Ethem Barkan Öz: former Turkish ambassador to Morocco.
- Alex Geiger Soffia: former Chilean ambassador to Morocco
- Jacobo Cuyún: former ambassador of Guatemala to Morocco

2021

- Daniela Bazavan: former Romanian ambassador to Morocco.

=== Commander ===
1919

- René Thiérry: Secretary of the Embassy at the French Legation in Portugal.

1920

- Neigel: Director of the Muslim College of Rabat.

1922

- Pierre-Georges Latécoère: airline operations manager Latécoère.

1926

- Louis Jean Martin: Inspector General of Bridges and Roads.

1937

- François-Didier Gregh: financial inspector.

1948

- Marcel Cerdan: French boxer

1950

- Harold D. Harris: United States Marine Corps general.

1953

- John Utter: Director for Africa at the US State Department.
- Duchateau: President of the Moroccan Association of Former Students of C.E.F Italy.

1955

- Monroe L. Nute: President of the Lions Clubs.
- Bouillot: director of the BRPM.

1970

- Jean-Claude Winkler: French chargé d'affaires in Morocco

1971

- Vassili Nesterenko: Soviet physicist.

1995

- Stevie Wonder: American singer.

2000

- Victor J.B. Pastor.
- John Duke Anthony: chairman of the U.S.-Morocco Affairs Council.

2002

- Nabil Khoury: Consul General of the United States in Casablanca.
- Chira Ratanarat: consul général honoraire du Maroc en Thaïlande.

2003

- Xiong Zhanqi: Chinese Ambassador to Morocco.
- Alaiin Delon: French actor and singer.
- Oliver Stone: American filmmaker.
- Ridley Scott: British film director and producer.
- Margaret Debardeleben Tutwiler: U.S. Ambassador to Morocco.

2004

- Jean Roatta: President of the France-Morocco friendship group at'Assemblée nationale française.
- Ramiah Rajagopalan: Indian Ambassador to Morocco.
- Jérôme Champagne: FIFA Deputy Secretary General.

2005

- Gérard Pélisson: Founding co-president of the group Accor.
- Mohamed Abdallah Guergaoui: Chairman of Dubai Holding.
- Corinne Breuzé: Consul General of France in Casablanca.
- Norman Baker: Heroes of the Odyssey RA II.
- John McCain: United States Senator.
- Lincoln Diaz-Balart: U.S. House of Representatives.
- Richard Lugar: United States Senator and Chairman of the Senate Foreign Relations Committee.

2006

- Philippe Faure: French Ambassador to Morocco.
- Abdulaziz Othman Altwaijri: general manager of the ISESCO.
- Mohamed El Abar: Chairman of the Emirati Group Emaar.
- Nabil Cherif: Jordanian Ambassador to Morocco.
- Christian de Boissieu: president of the Conseil d'Analyse Économique (CAE)and professor at the Université Paris-1 (Panthéon-Sorbonne).

2007

- Enrique Mugica: Spanish Ombudsman (Mediator), former minister and historical figure of the PSOE.
- Maria Rosa de Madariaga: historian and specialist in Moroccan-Spanish relations and the Rif War.
- Carmen Romero López: former deputy and activist for the rapprochement between Morocco and Spain.
- Juan Goytisolo: the great friend of Morocco, writer and citizen of Marrakech.
- Paquita Rumbao: assistant to several Moroccan ambassadors since independence.
- Juan Antonio Mateos: Former Mexican Ambassador to Morocco

2008

- Fatoumata Diakité Ndaye: mediator of the republic of Mali
- Jean-Paul Delevoye: Mediator of the French Republic.
- Gottfrid Haas: German Ambassador to Morocco.

2009

- Nicolas Merindol: former CEO of Groupe Caisse d'Epargne and current chairman of the Board of Directors of Crédit Foncier de France.
- Frédéric Jousset: founder and co-chairman of Webhelp.
- Warda Al Jazairia: Musical artist.
- Nour Eccharif: Egyptian actor.

2011

- Mohamed Saleh Ahmed Al-Tuwaikh: Kuwaiti Ambassador to Morocco.
- Manuel Valls: Mayor of Évry.and member of the National Assembly for Essonne.
- Patrick Kron: chairman and chief executive of Alstom.

2012

- Jacques Bourdillon: former manager at the national irrigation office.
- Tunç Ugdul: former Turkish ambassador to Morocco.

2013

- Francis Gurry: director general of the World Intellectual Property Organization.
- Christian Cambon: Senator and President of the France-Morocco Friendship Group in the French Senate
- Gilles Pargneaux: president of the EU-Morocco friendship group at the au European parliament and member of the Progressive Alliance of Socialists and Democrats.
- Abdelaziz Abderrahman Tourki Assbii: former Qatari ambassador to Morocco.
- Jacqueline Boix: official at the Royal Palace.
- Pedro José Pico: former Argentine ambassador to Morocco.
- Mohamed Ould Talba & Mohamed Ould Mouâouia: former ambassadors of Mauritania to Morocco.

2014

- Irina Bokova: Director General of UNESCO.
- Mo Ibrahim: businessman and entrepreneur, president of the "Mo Ibrahim Foundation for Better Governance in Africa".
- Mamadou Diagna Ndiaye: President of Senegalese National Olympic and Sports Committee.

2015

- Ugur Ariner: former Turkish ambassador to Morocco.
- Jean-Paul Carteron: Honorary Consul of Bulgaria in Monaco
- Jamil Soulaymane Hamza Jalal: Moutaouif at Al-Haram Ashcharif in Mecca.
- Bruce Lustig: of the Hebrew Congregation of Washington.
- Théodore Edgar McCarrick: Archbishop of Washington, D.C.
- Talib M. Shareef: President of the Nation's Mosque, Masjid Mohammed in Washington.
- Arthur Schneier: founder of the Appeal of Conscience Foundation.
- Timothy M. Dolan: Archbishop of New York.
- Demetrios: Archbishop of America.
- Clive Alderton: Ambassador of the United Kingdom to Morocco.

2016

- Abderrahmane ben Mohamed Al Jedaia: Saudi Arabian Ambassador to Morocco.
- Md Monirul Islam: Bangladesh Ambassador to Morocco.

2017

- Luc Chatel: president of the France-Morocco friendship group at the National Assembly.

2020

- Baba Garba: Nigerian Ambassador to Morocco.

2021

- Dam Boontham: former Ambassador of Thailand to Morocco
- David T. Fischer: former US Ambassador to Morocco.
- Bérénice Owen Jones: former Australian Ambassador to Morocco.
- LI Li: former Chinese Ambassador to Morocco.
- Mónica Renata Bolaños Pérez: former Ambassador of Guatemala to Morocco.
- Grecia Fiorda Pichardo De Camps: former Ambassador of the Dominican Republic to Morocco

2022

- Takashi Shinozuka: former Japanese Ambassador to Morocco.

2024

- Mohamed Ould Hanani: Ambassador of Mauritania to Morocco
- Keeyong Chung: former Ambassador of South Korea to Morocco
- Đặng Thị Thu Hà former Vietnamese ambassador to Morocco.

=== Officer ===
1927

- Risterucci: civil controller.

1975

- Pelé: Brazilian footballer

1978

- Attilio Gaudio: Journalist and professor at the École d'anthropologie de Paris.

1992

- Rudy Boschwitz: United States Senator.

1994

- Torsten Wolfgramm: member of the Parliamentary Assembly of the Council of Europe.

1995

- Nikolaus Voegeli: Honorary Consul General of Morocco.

1999

- Emilio Martínez Rosales: Chamber of Representatives of Colombia.

2001

- Mohamed Lemine Ould Cheiguer: President of the Mauritanian Football Federation.

2002

- Situ Shuang: Doctor of Letters from the Sorbonne University who wrote a book on Morocco in Chinese.
- Haj Imam Hilaludine: President of the Islamic Association of China.
- Xu Zhihong: President of Peking University.
- Saïd Kamilov: Russian scholar who translated Hassanian talks into Russian.

2004

- Bernard Kasriel: CEO of Lafarge.

2005

- Juan Pena Fernandez.

2007

- Spanish consul general in Morocco.
- Manuel Palomo Romero: President of the Association of Former Residents of Al-Hoceima in Spain.
- Fréderic Damgaard: gallery owner, art critic and historian.

2008

- Hans Van Baalen: member of the Foreign Affairs commission
- Mohamed Aïssa Al-Adoaune: Director of the Jordanian Documentation Center
- David Messas: Chief Rabbi of Paris.
- John Van Ameijden.
- José Monleon: director of the International Institute of Mediterranean Theater.
- Maria Dolores Lopez Enamorado: current director of the Cervantes Institute of Marrakech.
- Gonzalo Fernandez Parilla: one of the founders of the School of Translators of Toledo.
- Enrique Cascallana: socialist mayor of Alcorcon.
- Imanol Arias: actor.

2009

- Dimitris Haholiades: honorary consul of Morocco in Cyprus.

2010

- Jean-Paul Herteman: CEO of the group Safran.

2011

- Stefaan Vandevelde: President of the electrical and electronic distribution networks at the American group "Delphi" in Tangier.
- Meté Esin: Chairwoman of the Board of Directors of the Turkish company Toros.

2012

- Bertrand Piccard: pilot of the solar plane and founder of Solar Impulse.
- André Borchberg: pilot of the same plane and co-founder of Solar Impulse.
- Gerard Detourbet: director of the "Logan World" program.
- Richard Weber: former Deputy Director General of EuropeAid.

2013

- Amani Abou Zeid: resident representative of the African Development Bank in Morocco.
- Ishtiaq Baig: honorary consul general of Morocco in Karachi.
- Horst Rudolph: executive chairman of the group "Yazaki Europe Limited".

2014

- Akihiko Tanaka: president of Japan International Cooperation Agency.
- Pier Antonio Panzeri: member of the European Parliament and former chairman of the Committee on Relations with the Maghreb Countries in the European Parliament.
- Vanessa Branson: president and founder of the Arts Festival in Marrakech, now known as the Marrakech Biennale.
- Elisabeth Bauchet Bouhlal: artist and art collector.

2015

- José Alberto Alegria: Honorary Consul of Morocco in the Algarve.
- Dalila Araujo: former Portuguese Secretary of State for the Interior.
- Jean-Luc Martinez: President of the Louvre
- Eve Branson: Founder and director of the Eve Branson Foundation Philanthropist

2016

- William E. Heinecke: chairman of Minor International
- Bariza Khiari: vice-president of the France-Morocco friendship group of the Senate.

2020

- Panayotis N. Sarris: former Greek ambassador to Morocco

2021

- Barbara Bregato: Italian former ambassador to Morocco.

=== Knight ===
1931

- Robert Vaucher: Swiss journalist.

1933

- René Lepage: owner of the tanneries René Lepage.

1955

- Marcel Lepainteur: French Gendarme.

2002

- George François: former president of the Sylea Group
- Wieland Neuberth: President of the Roesner Company.

2007

- Dominique Nadjilla Mehadji: painter

2012

- Margareth Obank: director of the British magazine Banipal.

2013

- Honorary Consul of Morocco in Hong Kong.

2014

- Yannick Lintz: Director of the Department of Islamic Arts at the Louvre Museum in Paris.

2017

- Pham Truong Giang: former Vietnamese ambassador to Morocco.
- Albert I of Belgium
- Anthony Bailey (PR advisor)
- Paul Biya
- Prince Dominique de La Rochefoucauld-Montbel
- Wesley Clark
- Ernest J. Dawley
- Thomas Scheen Falck
- Mohamed Habib Gherab
- Jean Gilles (French Army officer)
- Edvard Hambro
- René Imbot
- Jared Kushner
- André Malraux
- Miguel Ángel Moratinos
- Michel Raingeard
- Elliott Roosevelt
- Arthur Tedder, 1st Baron Tedder
- Officers
  - Dimitri Amilakhvari
  - Paul Arnaud de Foïard
  - Serge Dumont
  - Henri Honoré d'Estienne d'Orves
  - Abdelkader Mesli
  - Xavier Rolet
  - Yuri Senkevich
- Knights
  - Gustave Daladier
- Commanders
  - Andrew Cunningham
  - Marcel Alessandri
  - Georges Bergé
  - Gaston Billotte
  - Pierre Billotte
  - Pierre Clostermann
  - Jean-Paul David
  - Harold D. Harris
  - Antoine Huré
  - Georges Journois
  - Curtis LeMay
  - John A. Lynn
  - Yves Pouliquen
  - Peter Sutherland
  - Joseph Vuillemin
- Grand Officers
  - Cristian Barros
  - Dominique de La Rochefoucauld-Montbel
  - Avi Berkowitz
  - Eugène Claudius-Petit
  - Willy Coppens
  - Andrew Cunningham, 1st Viscount Cunningham of Hyndhope
  - Jean-Philippe Douin
  - Robert de Foy
  - Ernest N. Harmon
  - Thor Heyerdahl
  - Raoul Magrin-Vernerey
  - Maurice Pellé
  - Benoît Puga
  - Josef Šnejdárek
  - Mariano Hugo, Prince of Windisch-Graetz
- Grand Crosses
  - Hubert Lyautey
  - Abbas II of Egypt
  - Kenneth Anderson (British Army officer)
  - Henry H. Arnold
  - Bảo Đại
  - René Pleven
  - Jean-Bédel Bokassa
  - Mark W. Clark
  - Henri Claudel
  - Ferdinand Foch
  - Jaime Gama
  - Alexander Godley
  - Fortune FitzRoy, Duchess of Grafton
  - Henrik, Prince Consort of Denmark
  - Charles Huntziger
  - Joseph Joffre
  - Alphonse Juin
  - Marie-Pierre Kœnig
  - Lucien Loizeau
  - Margrethe II of Denmark
  - Pakubuwana X
  - Muhammad VIII al-Amin
  - Friis Arne Petersen
  - Jagatjit Singh
  - Walter Bedell Smith
  - Witold Spirydowicz
  - Jan Syrový
  - Maxime Weygand

== 1943 ceremony ==
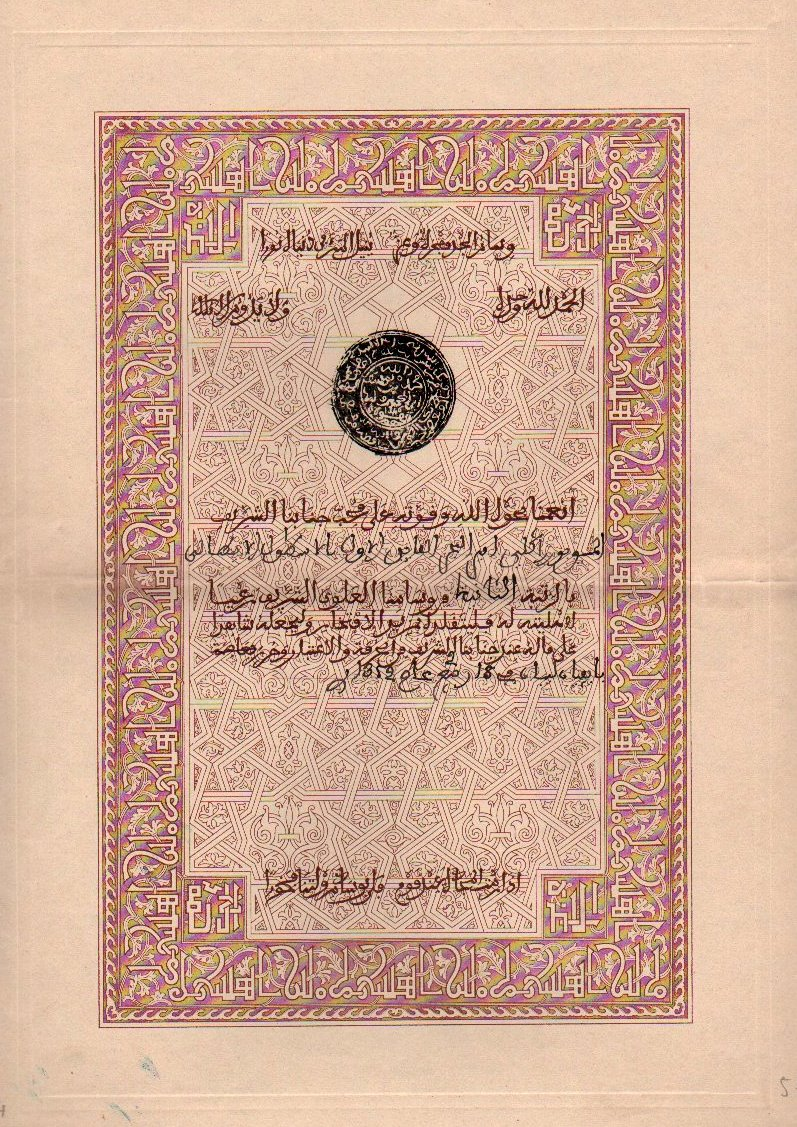
Moroccan decree (dahir) which proclaims and confirms that the Order of Oissam Alaouite is conferred on Ernesto Burzagli in 1922.

In the opening scene of the film Patton, George C. Scott, portraying then-Major General Patton, is shown receiving the Grand Cross of the Order of Ouissam Alaouite. This was no mere Hollywood contrivance. Under Patton's command, Allied forces took Casablanca after only four days of fighting. So impressed was the Sultan of Morocco that he presented Patton with the special Order of Ouissam Alaouite, with the citation: "Les Lions dans leurs tanières tremblent en le voyant approcher" (The lions in their dens tremble at his approach). Patton wryly described the ceremony as a "non-military activity," but in his memoirs, he does not fail to note the Operation Torch staff officers who were similarly honored on that occasion.
