= Beit al-Hikma Foundation =

National academy in Tunisia

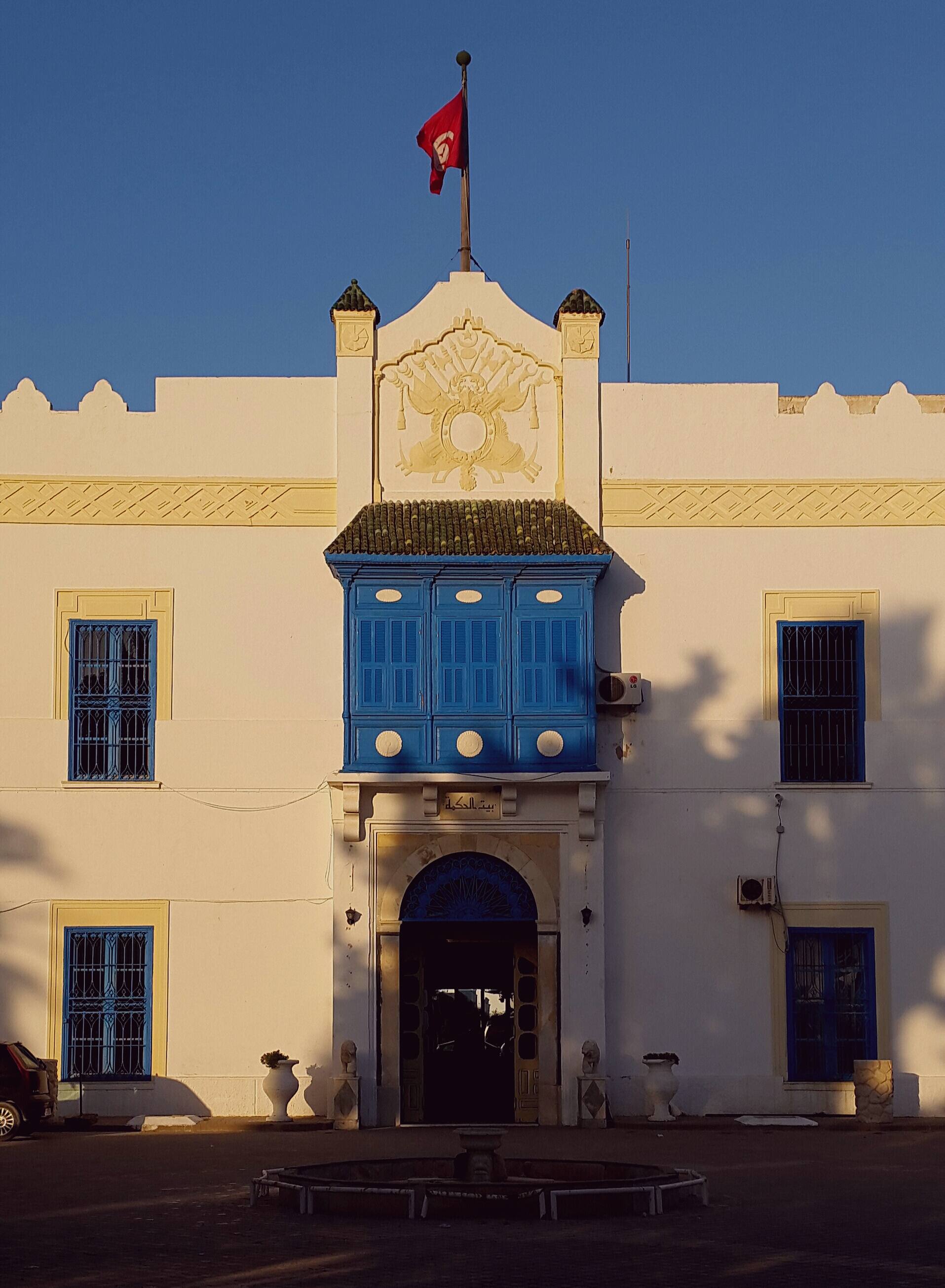
Tunisian Academy of Sciences, Letters, and Arts

The Beit al-Hikma Foundation (shortened to Beit al-Hikma) or Tunisian Academy of Sciences, Letters and Arts is a scholarly national academy based in Tunis. It is housed officially in a mid-19th-century palace, Zarrouk Palace, a former royal palace, situated on the Mediterranean coast at the base of the ruins of ancient Carthage. It is a member academy of the Union Académique Internationale.

== History ==
The Academy was founded in 1992 as a successor to the National Foundation for Translation, Establishment of Texts and Studies, which had been founded in 1983. The Academy was reorganized and re-initiated in July 2012.

== Objectives ==
The Academy lists its objectives as:

- to serve as a meeting-place for scholars and to provide them with the opportunity for promoting research and for exchanging ideas and experience;
- to contribute to the enrichment of the Arabic language, helping it to keep abreast with current developments in the sciences and arts;
- to help safeguard national heritage through research and publication;
- to compile dictionaries and encyclopaedias and to translate works from and into Arabic;
- to organize symposia and conferences;
- to encourage creativity and the distribution of intellectual and artistic works;
- to advise government or official bodies.

== Governance ==
The Academy is composed of a President, a Scientific Council, and a Board of Directors.

The Presidents of the Academy (and its predecessor, since its foundation in 1983) serve for life, or until resignation, and comprise the following:

- Ahmed Abdessalem (1983–1987)
- Azeddin Beschaouch (1987–1991)
- Saad Ghrab (1991–1995)
- Abdelwahab Bouhdiba (1995–2011)
- Mohamed Talbi (2011)
- Hichem Djait (2011–2015)
- Abdelmajid Charfi (2015-).

The Scientific Council consists of members, appointed for life, organized into Mathematical and Natural Sciences, Humanities and Social Sciences, Islamic Sciences, Letters and Arts. Membership is limited to 80: 50 active Tunisians resident in Tunisia; 10 active Tunisians resident abroad; 15 associate foreign national members; and 5 Tunisian honorary members.

The Board of Directors is chaired by the president and consists of the heads of the Scientific Council's five departments, a representative of the Tunisian president and one each from the Tunisian Ministries of Finance, Culture, Education and Higher Education and Scientific Research, plus one appointed by virtue of his or her administrative and financial management abilities. The ministerial representatives are appointed by the head of the government of Tunisia for terms of three years, renewable no more than twice.

== Publications ==
The Academy has published extensively, many items resulting from its conferences. The majority are in Arabic. Fuller information on the Academy, its programs and its publications can be found on the Academy's website.
