= Jean-Marc Adjovi-Bocco =

Beninese footballer

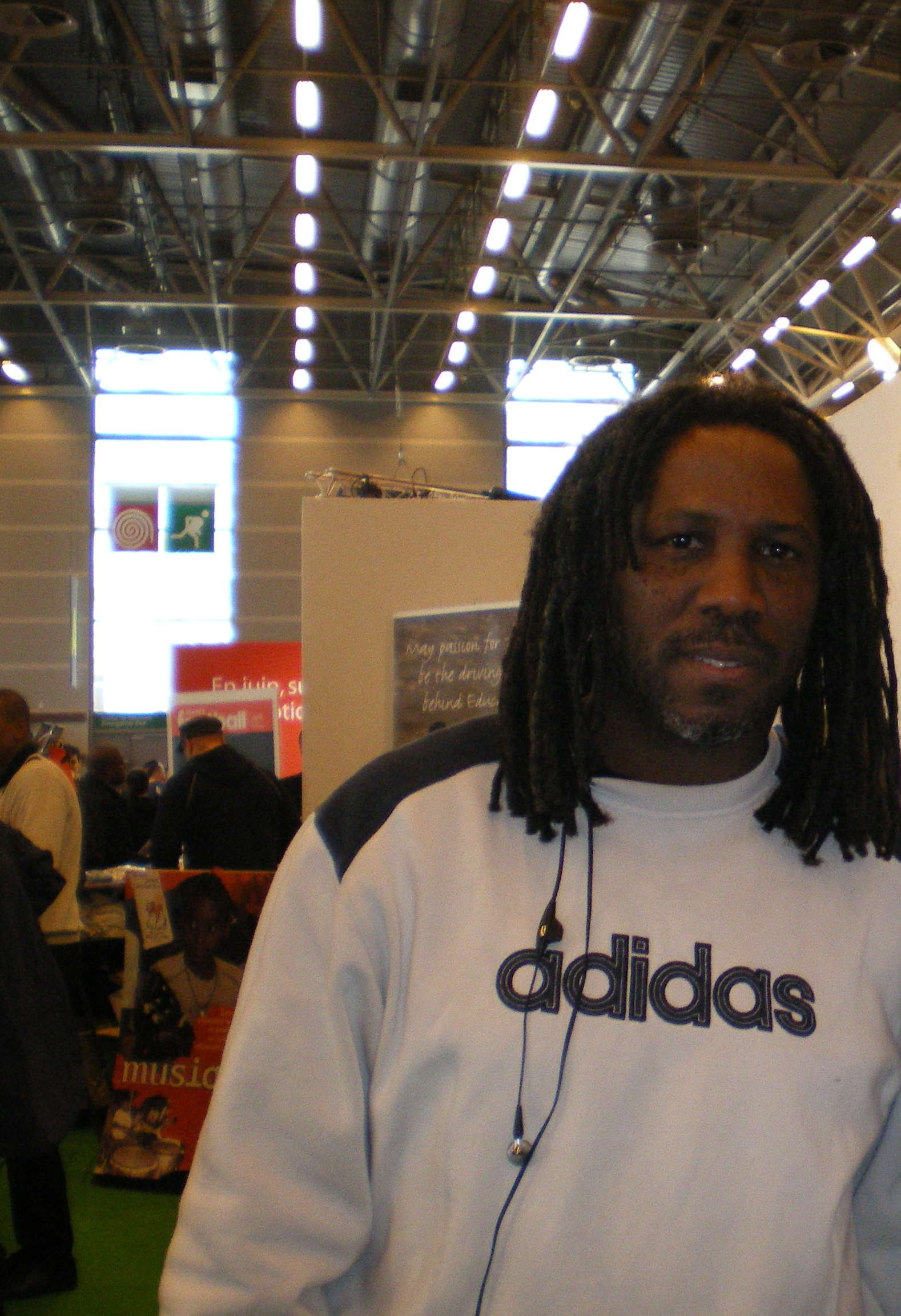
- Adjovi-Bocco in 2008

Personal information
- Full name: Jean-Marc Adjovi-Bocco
- Date of birth: 22 December 1963 (age 62)
- Place of birth: Cotonou, Benin
- Height: 1.84 m (6 ft 0 in)
- Position: Defender

Senior career*
Years	Team	Apps	(Gls)
1983–1984	US Chantilly		
1984–1986	AS Creil		
1986–1987	Amiens	22	(0)
1987–1988	FC Rouen	28	(0)
1988–1991	Tours	93	(0)
1991–1997	Lens	195	(0)
1997–1998	Hibernian	29	(0)

International career
- Benin
- * Club domestic league appearances and goals

Jean-Marc Adjovi-Bocco (born 22 December 1963) is a Beninese former professional footballer who played as a defender. Bocco captained the Benin national football team, until he retired from international football in the summer of 1997.

In a 2020 interview, Bocco reflected upon his time at Hibernian, saying that he would love to have played for another season in Scotland, but left to make room for younger players following the dismissal of manager Jim Duffy.
