= Mohamed Talbi =

Tunisian academic, historian and Islamologist (1921–2017)

Doctor of History Mohamed Talbi
- محمد الطالبي
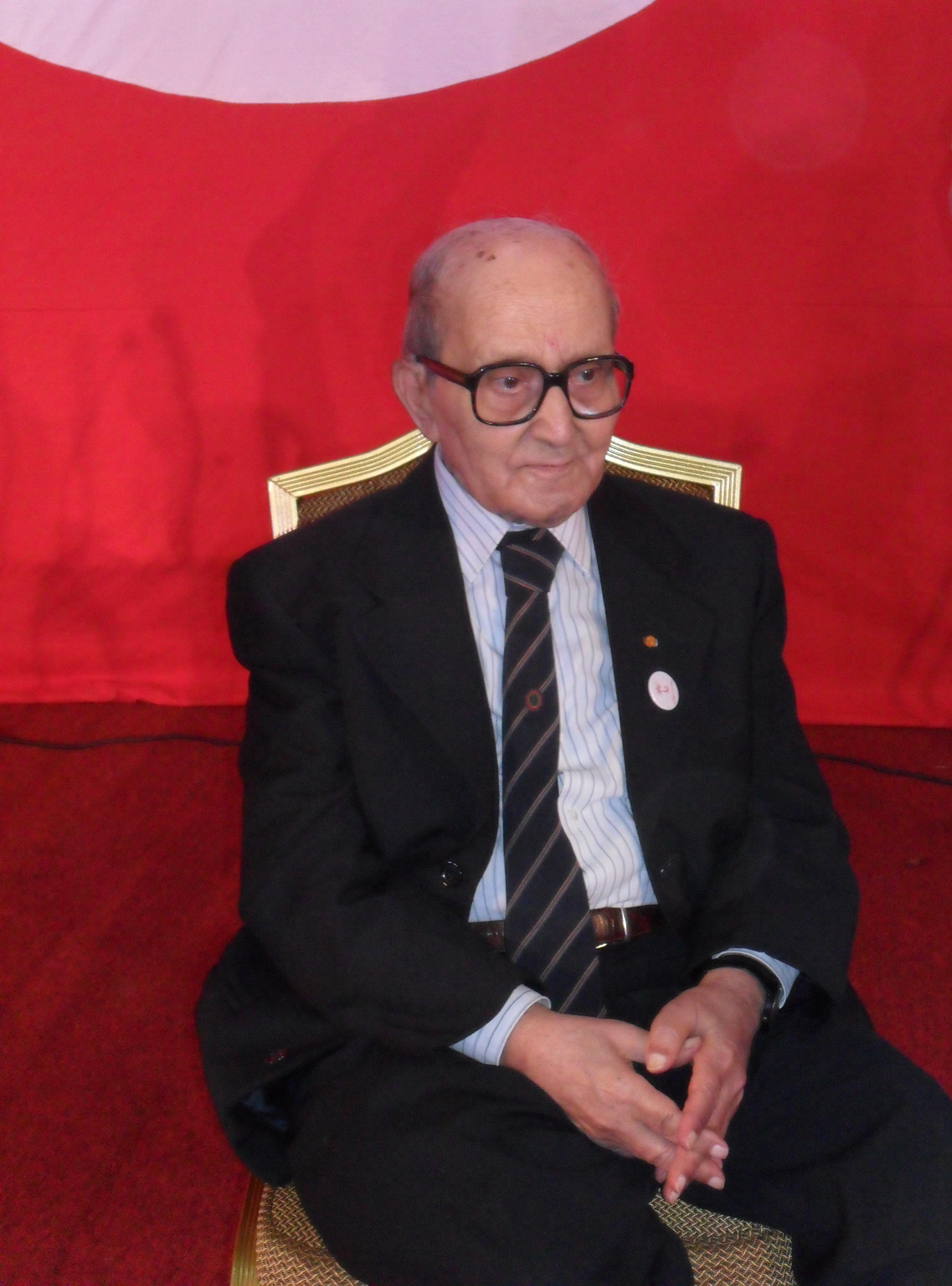
- Talbi in 11 November 2012
- Born: 16 September 1921; Tunis, Tunisia
- Died: 1 May 2017 (aged 95); Tunis, Tunisia
- Education: Doctorate in History from the Sorbonne University
- Occupations: author, professor, Islamologist
- Employer(s): University of Tunis, Tunisian Academy of Sciences and Arts (2011-2012)
- Known for: Islamic studies
- Title: Professor
- Movement: Islamic democracy

Mohamed Talbi (Arabic: محمد الطالبي), (16 September 1921 – 1 May 2017) was a Tunisian author, professor, and Islamologist.

== Biography ==
Talbi was born in Tunis on 16 September 1921, attending school there and going on to study in Paris. Talbi wrote prolifically on a wide range of topics, including the history of the medieval Maghreb, Islam and its relationship with both women and democracy, and Islam's role in the modern world.

Talbi died in Tunis on 1 May 2017.

== Career ==
Talbi spent most of his educational career teaching Mediterranean and North African history. He taught the Institute of Higher Education of Tunis. In 1966, he became the first dean of the School of Letter and Human Sciences of Tunis, as well as chairing the school's history department. He later directed the scientific journal Les Cahiers de Tunisie.

In 1968, Talbi defended his Ph.D. thesis, The Aghlabid Emirate, a political History, at the Sorbonne. It was focused on Tunisia's first Muslim dynasty, addressing especially the history and key role of slavery in the Emirate’s agriculture and economy.

Talbi was appointed president of the Tunisian Academy of Sciences, Letters, and Arts between 2011 and 2012.

== Views ==
On the subject of Islam and democracy, Talbi rejected any direct association between Shura and democracy. He argued that shura originated before Western and Islamic concepts of democracy had even developed, and that the two were not analogous . Talbi also argued that democracy as rule by the people and notions of human rights, religious pluralism, and equality under the law, embodies values which Talbi believed constituted authentic Islam.

Talbi participated in a number of interfaith dialogues with North African and European Christians, but also criticized the practice often. In a 1987 article, Talbi criticized the (at the time) current poverty of Muslim initiatives or even responses to Euro-Arab or Muslim-Christian dialogue. Talbi also explicitly declared Islam to be open to dialogue with other faiths and cultures. Talbi viewed Muslim-Christian dialogue as a significant religious matter.

== Awards ==
Ribbon bar	Country	Honour
	Tunisia	Grand Officer of the Order of the Republic
	Tunisia	Commander of the Order of Merit
	Tunisia	Officer of the Order of the Independence
	France	Officer of the Legion of Honour
	Spain	Commander of the Order of Civil Merit

== Administrative positions ==
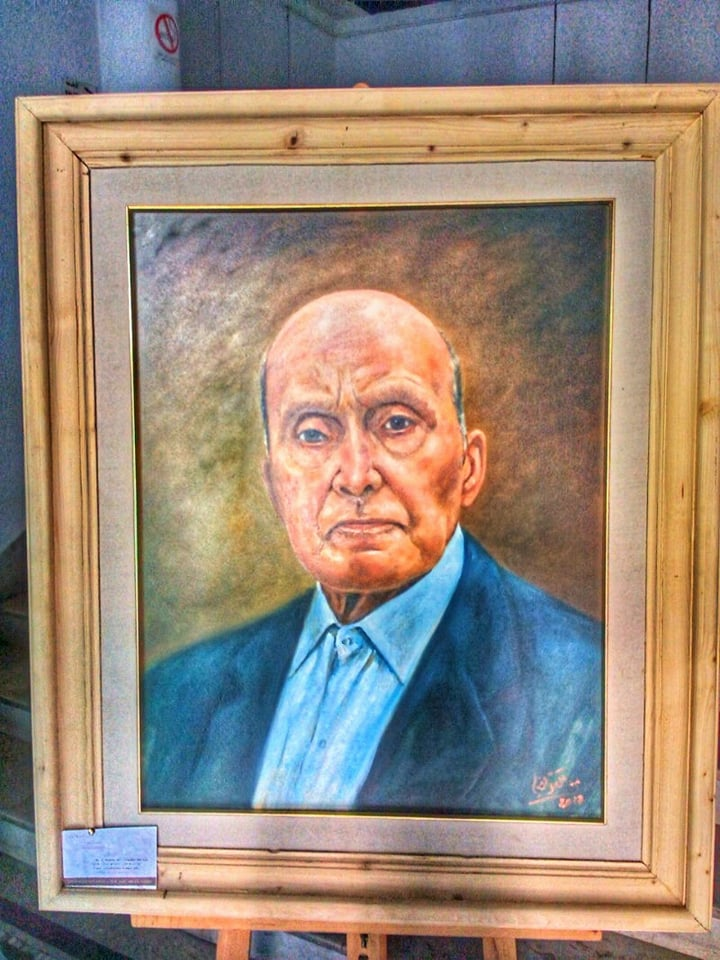
Portrait of Talbi, artist unknown

- Member of the Real Academia de la Historia (1970)
- Member of the editorial team of the Encyclopaedia of Islam (1978)
- Member of the Universal Academy of Cultures (1994)
- President of the Tunisian Academy of Sciences, Letters, and Arts (2011-2012)

== Other acknowledgements ==
- 1979 : Premio letterario internazionale del Mediterraneo (Italy)
- 1985 : The Léopold Lucas Prize (Germany)
- 1987 : The Cultural National Prize (Tunisia)
- 1991 : The Literature National Prize (Tunisia)
- 1994 : Hiroshima Prize for Peace and Cultural (Sweden)
- 1997 : The Senator Giovanni Agnelli International Prize (Italy)
- 2017 : Ibn Khaldun Award in Humanities (granted posthumously; Tunisia)
- 2024 : Prix Fondation de la Maison de Tunisie (granted posthumously; Tunisia)

== Bibliography ==
=== In French ===
- Al-Mukhassass d'Ibn Sïda : études et index, ed. Imprimerie officielle, Tunis, 1956
- Histoire générale de la Tunisie (collective book), tome II « Le Moyen Âge », ed. Société tunisienne de diffusion, Tunis, 1965
- L'émirat aghlabide (186-296/800-909) : histoire politique, ed. Adrien Maisonneuve, Paris, 1966 (ISBN 2-7200-0493-6)
- Biographies aghlabides extraites des Madarik du Cadi Iyād (critical edition), ed. Imprimerie officielle de la République tunisienne, Tunis, 1968
- Ibn Khaldûn et l'Histoire, ed. Société tunisienne de diffusion, Tunis, 1965, republishing. Maison tunisienne de l'édition, Tunis, 1973, republishing. Cartaginoiseries, Carthage, 2006
- Islam en dialogue, ed. Maison tunisienne d'édition, Tunis, 1970
- Islam et dialogue, réflexion sur un thème d'actualité, ed. Maison tunisienne d'édition, Tunis, 1972
- Étude d’histoire ifrîqiyenne et de civilisation musulmane médiévale, ed. Université de Tunis, Tunis, 1982
- Réflexions sur le Coran (with Maurice Bucaille), ed. Seghers, Paris, 1989 (ISBN 2-232-10148-7)
- Études sur la tolérance (collective book), ed. Beït El Hikma, Carthage, 1995
- Un respect têtu (with Olivier Clément), ed. Nouvelle Cité, Paris, 1995 (ISBN 2-85313-188-2)
- Plaidoyer pour un islam moderne, ed. Desclée de Brouwer, Paris, 1998 (ISBN 2-220-04251-0)
- Penseur libre en islam. Un intellectuel musulman dans la Tunisie de Ben Ali (with Gwendoline Jarczyk), ed. Albin Michel, Paris, 2002 (ISBN 2-226-13204-X)
- Universalité du Coran, ed. Actes Sud, Arles, 2002 (ISBN 2-7427-3605-0)
- Oriente-Occidente : cartografías de una distancia [Direction], ed. Fondation Marcelino Botín, Santander, 2004
- Réflexion d'un musulman contemporain, ed. Fennec, Casablanca, 2005
- Afin que mon cœur se rassure, ed. Nirvana, Tunis, 2010
- Gaza, barbarie biblique ou de l'extermination sacrée et humanisme coranique, ed. Mohamed Talbi, Tunis, 2010
- L'Islam n'est pas voile, il est culte : rénovation de la pensée musulmane, ed. Cartaginoiseries, Carthage, 2010
- Goulag et démocratie, ed. Mohamed Talbi, Tunis, 2011
- À Benoît XVI, ed. Mohamed Talbi, Tunis, 2011
- Ma religion c'est la liberté : l'islam et les défis de la contemporanéité, ed. Nirvana, Tunis, 2011 (ISBN 978-9973-855-35-0)
- Histoire du Christ. Histoire d’une fraude textes à l’appui, s. ed., Tunis, 2011
- Méditations sur le Coran : Vérité, rationalité, I'jaz scientifique, ed. Mohamed Talbi, Tunis, 2016
- Dieu est amour : guide du musulman coranique, ed. Nirvana, Tunis, 2017

=== In Italian ===
- Rispetto nel dialogo. Islamismo e cristianesimo (with Olivier Clément), éd. San Paolo, Roma, 1994
- Un'urgenza dei tempi modern : il dialogo fra gli universi culturali (with Giovanni Agnelli & Marcello Pacini), ed. Fondation Giovanni Agnelli, Turino, 1997
- Le vie del dialogo nell'Islam, ed. Fondation Giovanni Agnelli, Turino, 1999
- Islam e libero pensiero. Laicità e democrazia nel mondo musulmano, ed. UTET Università, Milano, 2005
- Università del Corano, ed. Jaca Book, Milano, 2007

=== In Dutch ===
- Dialog mit Afrika und dem Islam (with Léopold Sédar Senghor), ed. Mohr Siebeck, Tübingen, 1987

=== In Arabic ===
- Al-Turtûshî, al Hawâdith wa-l-Bida (تحقيق الحوادث و البدع لمحمد بن الوليد الطرطوشي أبو بكر), ed. Imprimerie officielle, Tunis, 1959
- Tarājim Aghlabīyah : mustakhrajah min Madārik al-Qādī ʻIyāḍ (تراجم أغلبيّة مستخرجة من مدارك القاضي عياض), ed. Imprimerie officielle, Tunis, 1968
- Manhajiyyat lbn Khaldûn al-Tâ'rîkhiyya (منهجية ابن خلدون التاريخيّة), ed. Dâr al-Hadathâ, Beyrouth, 1981
- Dirāsāt fī tārīkh Ifrīqīyah wa-fī al-ḥaḍārah al-Islāmiyah fī al-ʻaṣr al-wasīṭ (دراسات في تاريخ إفريقيا في الحضارة الإسلاميّة في العصر الوسيط), ed. University of Tunis, Tunis, 1982
- Al-dawlaẗu al-aġhlabiyyaẗ (184-296/800-909) : Al-tārīkẖ al-siyāsī (الدولة الأغلبيّة : 296 - 184 / 909-808 : التاريخ السياسي), ed. Dār al-Gharb al-Islāmī, Beyrouth, 1985
- Nahnou wa al-ġharb (نحن و الغرب), ed. Abdelkarim Ben Abdallah, Tunis, 1992 (Collective Work)
- Iyal Allah : Afkar Jadidah fi 'Alaqat al-Muslim bi-nafsihi wa bi al-Akharin (عيال الله : أفكار جديدة في علاقة المسلم بنفسه و بالآخرين), ed. Cérès, Tunis, 1992
- Fi Tārīkh Ifrīqīyah (في تاريخ إفريقية : أعلام – مواقع – قضايا), ed. Beït El Hikma, Carthage, 1994
- Ummat al-Wasat (أمة الوسط : الإسلام و تحديات المعاصرة), ed. Cérès, Tunis, 1996
- Al-Islâm : Hurriyatun wa Hiwâr (الإسلام حرّية و حوار), ed. Dâr al-Nahâr, Beyrouth, 1999
- Li yatma'inna qālbî : Quādhiyatû el-îmān (ليطمئن قلبي : قضية الإيمان), ed. Cérès, Tunis, 2007
- Quādhiyatû al-Hâquîqua (قضية الحقيقة), ed. Mohamed Talbi, Tunis, 2015
- Dalil al-muslim al-Cor'ānî (دليل المسلم القرآني), ed. Mohamed Talbi, Tunis, 2016
- Al-Ṣiraa' al-lāhoutî fi Al-Qayrawân ayam al-aġhaliba (الصّراع اللاّهوتي في القيروان أيّام الأغالبة), ed. Sotumedias, Tunis, 2017
