= National Council for Liberties in Tunisia =

The National Council for Liberties in Tunisia (French: Le Conseil national pour les libertés en Tunisie – CNLT) is a Tunisian NGO that specializes in human rights.

The Council was established in 1998 by around thirty people, including Moncef Marzouki, Mustapha Ben Jaafar and Sihem Bensedrine. It is part of the International Federation of Human Rights Leagues and of the Euro-Mediterranean Human Rights Network. The association works for the protection of human rights and detects violations, particularly, during the electoral procedures.

== Foundation ==
In the mid-1990s, the Tunisian League for Human Rights (LTDH) experienced a deep internal crisis. Noting that the LTDH can no longer function normally, 34 personalities the vast majority of human rights activists, decided to found the CNLT in 1998. The founders chose 10 December, the anniversary of the Universal Declaration of Human Rights, to declare the birth of the NGO. However, Zine El Abidine Ben Ali's government did not recognize the organization and prohibited its activities. The CNLT was finally recognized only after the Tunisian revolution, on 28 February 2011.

== Actions under the Ben Ali dictatorship ==
Under Zine el-Abidine Ben Ali's rule the CNLT is engaged in a double battle: respect for human rights, as well as fight for the right to exist. In response to its ban in 1999 the CNLT files a lawsuit at the Administrative court against the Ministry of Interior for abuse of power. His file was not examined and remained confiscated by the president of the court without any legal reason. CNLT activists were, during this period, victims of Police misconduct, as well as defamation in newspapers close to power. This was, even, followed by imprisonment of Moncef Marzouki in December 2000, Sihem Bensedrine in 2001, Mohamed Abbou in 2005, Zakia Dhifaoui and Mohamed Ben Saïd in 2008. In addition, the CNLT was deprived of all funding.

CNLT's activity in human rights was directed towards reporting on the human rights situation in Tunisia and the drafting of press releases aimed at awakening public opinion of the violations of human rights. The CNLT also assisted victims of abuse and their families particularly at the time of trials and following their imprisonment or during additional administrative penalties. The Council, particularly, supported the victims of the major trials of the 2003 anti-terrorist law.

== Founder members ==
- Khadija Chérif
- Hela Abdeljaouad
- Sana Ben Achour
- Zakia Dhifaoui
- Mohamed and Samia Abbou
- Naziha Réjiba (Oum Zied)
- [[Sihem Bensedrine
- Abdeljelil Bédoui]]
- Khalil Zaouia
- Larbi Chouikha
- Mohamed Nouri
- Mustapha Ben Jaafar
- Hechmi Jegham
- Abdelkader Ben Khemis
- Mohamed Mokhtar Arbaoui
- Moncef Marzouki
- Mongi Ben Salah
- Ahmed Kilani
- Mohamed Talbi
- Abderraouf Ayadi
- Tahar Mestiri
- Ahmed Galaï
- Kamel Jendoubi
- Lotfi Hidouri
- Mohamed Ben Saïd
- Omar Mestiri
- Ali Ben Salem
