= Hind Shalabi =

Tunisian Islamic scholar (died 2021)

- Born: Tunisia
- Died: 24 June 2021
- Occupations: Academic, Muslim scholar
- Known for: Researcher in Qur’anic sciences, Professor of interpretation at Ez-Zitouna University
- Notable work: "Scientific Interpretation of the Holy Qur'an Between Theories and Application", "Readings in Ifriqiya from the conquest to the middle of the fifth century AH", "Conjugations”

Hind Shalabi (Arabic: هند شلبي) (died on 24 June 2021), was a Tunisian researcher in Qur’anic sciences. She was a professor of interpretation at Ez-Zitouna University. She was given the nickname – "the owner of the Shalabi outfit", which is a description given by the scholar Mohamed Chedly Ennaifer since she was the first Tunisian to wear the hijab and storm the university walls with it.

== Biography ==
Hind Shalabi came from an ancient Zaytuna family. Her father, Sheikh Ahmed Shalabi, was one of Ez-Zitouna’s professors. She memorized the Qur’an at an early age at the hands of Sheikh Muhammad al-Dala’i with Riwayat Qalon A’n Nafi’, and she is one of the first Tunisian women to obtain an academic education at Ez-Zitouna University, where she studied at the hands of Sheikh Mohamed Fadhel Ben Achour, Ahmed bin Milad, Ali al-Shabi, Mohamed Habib Belkhodja and others. Finally, she obtained her bachelor's degree in the Fundamentals of Religion in 1968, and also received a doctorate. Then, she was appointed as a professor and researcher in Qur’anic sciences in 1981 at the same university until she retired.

She was interested in scientific research and academic achievement and chose to stay away from the spotlight. She wrote several books and papers in Islamic heritage, most notably the book – "Scientific Interpretation of the Holy Qur'an Between Theories and Application", "Readings in Ifriqiya from the conquest to the middle of the fifth century AH" and "Conjugations”.

== Habib Bourguiba Challenge ==
In 1975, as part of the celebration of the International Women's Year, Hind Shalabi gave a lecture to the late President Habib Bourguiba on the status of women in Islam and sparked controversy after criticizing Bourguiba's liberal policies related to the Code of Personal Status in Tunisia, which she considered inconsistent with the provisions of the Qur'an and Sunnah.

Despite the restrictions she suffered after Bourguiba issued a circular in 1981, prohibiting the wearing of the veil in State institutions, which continued to operate under the Ben Ali regime, Dr. Hind adhered to the Islamic dress. She resorted to the traditional Tunisian attire – "Al-Sassari”; a white silk quilt covering the woman from her head to the bottom of her feet.

== Works ==
Hind Shalabi published five books ranging from authorship to investigation between (1979-1990):

- 1979: “Conjugations: Interpretation of the Qur’an, whose names were suspected, and its meanings acted” (original title: Al-Tasareef: Tafser Al Quran mma eshtabaht asmaoh wa tsrft maaneh), by Yahya Ben Salam (investigation), Tunisian Company for Distribution
- 1983: “Readings in Ifriqiya from the conquest to the middle of the fifth century AH” (original title: Al-Qeraat be-efrqya mn Al-fateh ela montasaf alqarn alkhams), The Arabian Book House, (which is her PhD thesis)
- 1985: “Scientific Interpretation of the Holy Qur'an Between Theories and Application" (original title: Al-tafser alelmi llquran alkareem byn alnadareyat wa altatbeeq)
- 1990: “The title of the guide from the decree of the download line, by Ibn al-Banna' al-Marrakushi” (original title: Onwan Al-daleel men marsoom khat altanzel), (Investigation), Dar al-Gharb al-Islami, Beirut

== Death ==
She died on 24 June 2021, due to COVID-19 complications.
