= Sana Ben Achour =

Tunisian academic, jurist and activist

- سناء بن عاشور
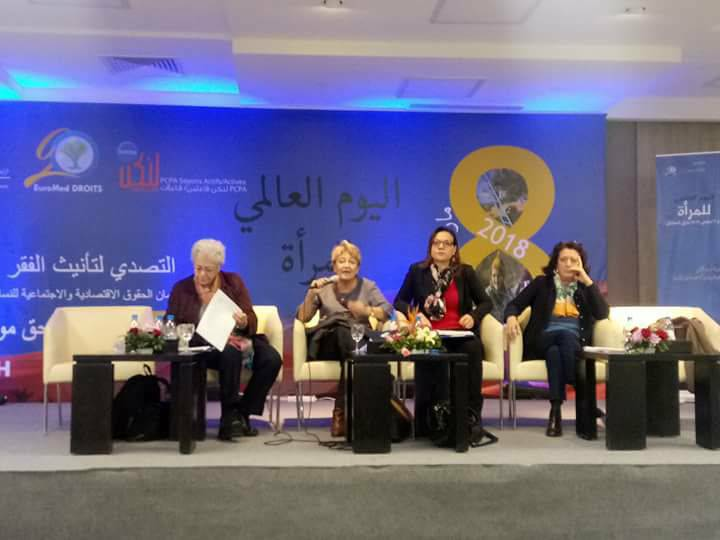
- Hafidha Chekir, Sana Ben Achour, Ansar Mnawer and Khedija Cherif, 2018
- Born: 1955 (age 70–71); La Marsa, Tunisia
- Occupations: Academic, lawyer, and activist
- Title: Professor of Public Law, University of Carthage; Faculty of Legal, Political, and Social Sciences, University of Carthage
- Father: Mohamed Fadhel Ben Achour
- Relatives: Yadh Ben Achour (brother); Muhammad al-Tahir ibn Ashur (grandfather); Abdelmalek Ben Achour (uncle)

Sana Ben Achour (Arabic: سناء بن عاشور, born 1955) is a Tunisian academic, lawyer and activist, and a specialist in public law. She is a professor of public law at the Faculty of Legal, Political and Social Sciences at the University of Carthage. She is active in several feminist organisations, and has founded a women's refuge shelter.

== Early life ==
Sana Ben Achour was born in La Marsa, Tunisia in 1955, daughter of the theologian Mohamed Fadhel Ben Achour (1909–1970). She is the sister of Rafâa and Yadh Ben Achour.

== Career ==
Ben Achour's career has focused on legal education and scientific research in law, and her work covers four main areas: urbanism and cultural heritage, Tunisian law during the colonial period, the status of women, and democracy and civil liberties.

An activist committed to equality and citizenship, she is involved with several organizations: the Tunisian Association of Democratic Women (Association tunisienne des femmes démocrates - ATFD), of which she has been the president, the Association of University Women for Research and Development, and the Collective Maghreb 95 Equality. She is a member of the Higher Committee for Human Rights and Fundamental Freedoms, and a founding member of the National Council for Liberties in Tunisia.

In 2012, she founded a women's refuge shelter, Beity (translation: My Home), for single mothers and other women in need, including poor and abused women. Ben Achour is also a member of the Tunisian human rights League.

In 2015, she was included in the BBC's 100 Women, celebrating 21st century women worldwide.

In August 2016, she declined to receive the Order of the Republic from the President of Tunisia, Béji Caïd Essebsi in protest at the treatment of women in her country.

== Publications ==
- Violences à l'égard des femmes: les lois du genre, Tunis, Réseau euro-méditerranéen des droits de l'homme, 2016
- Dictionnaire des termes et des expressions de la constitution tunisienne, Tunis, Faculté des sciences juridiques de Tunis, 2017, (With Rafâa Ben Achour, Sarra Maaouia Kacem, Mouna Kraiem Dridi et Amira Chaouch)
