= Dar Ben Achour =

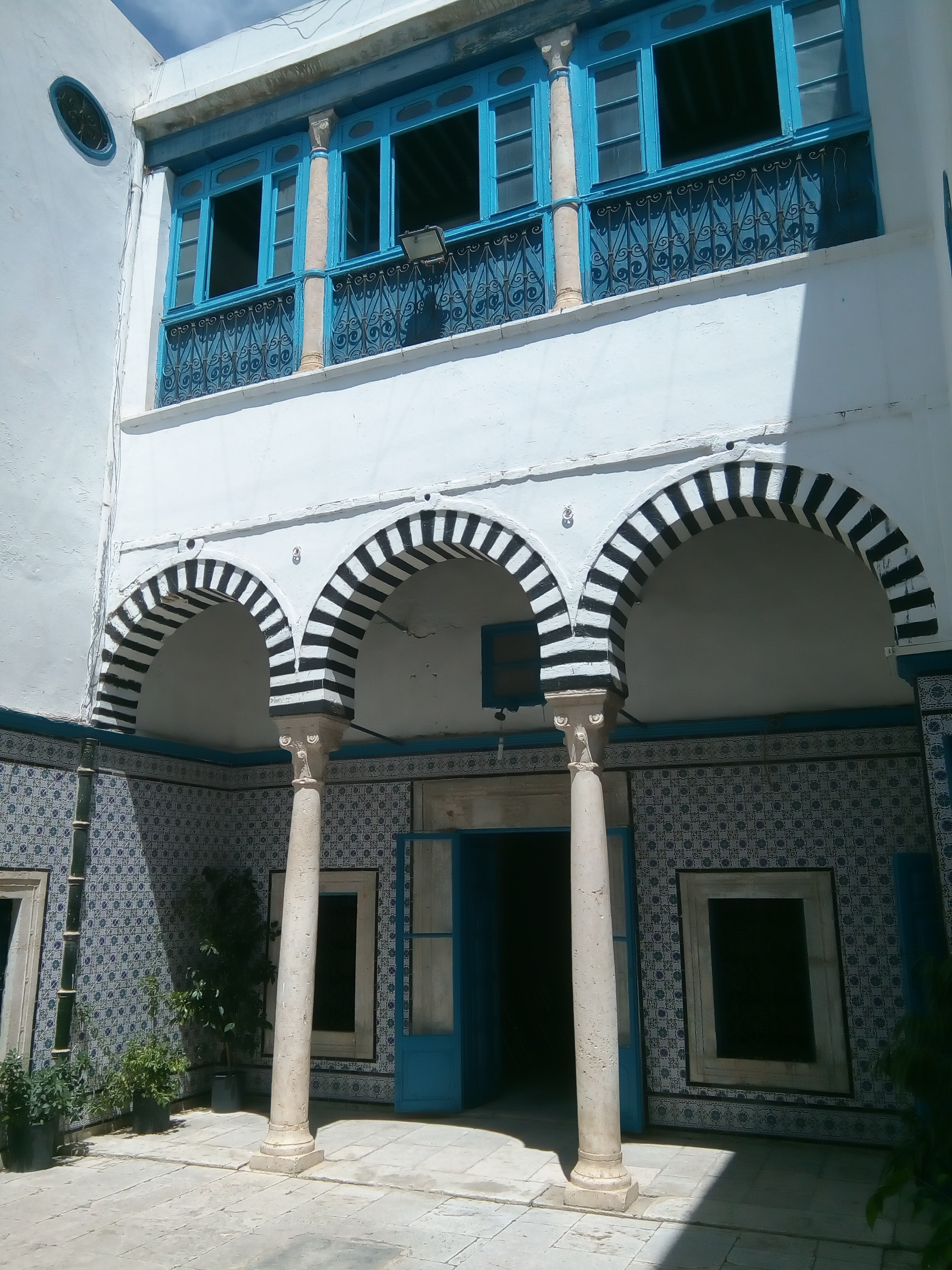
- Interactive map of the Dar Ben Achour area

General information
- Type: Palace
- Architectural style: Moorish architecture Tunisian architecture
- Location: Medina of Tunis, Tunis, Tunisia
- Year built: 17th century
- Client: Ben Achour Family; Mohammed Aziz Bouattour; Ibn Ashur; Mohamed Fadhel Ben Achour

Dar Ben Achour (Arabic: دار بن عاشور), previously known as Dar Bouattour is a palace in the medina of Tunis, built in the 17th century and located in the Pasha Street. Nowadays, it houses the library of the city of Tunis.

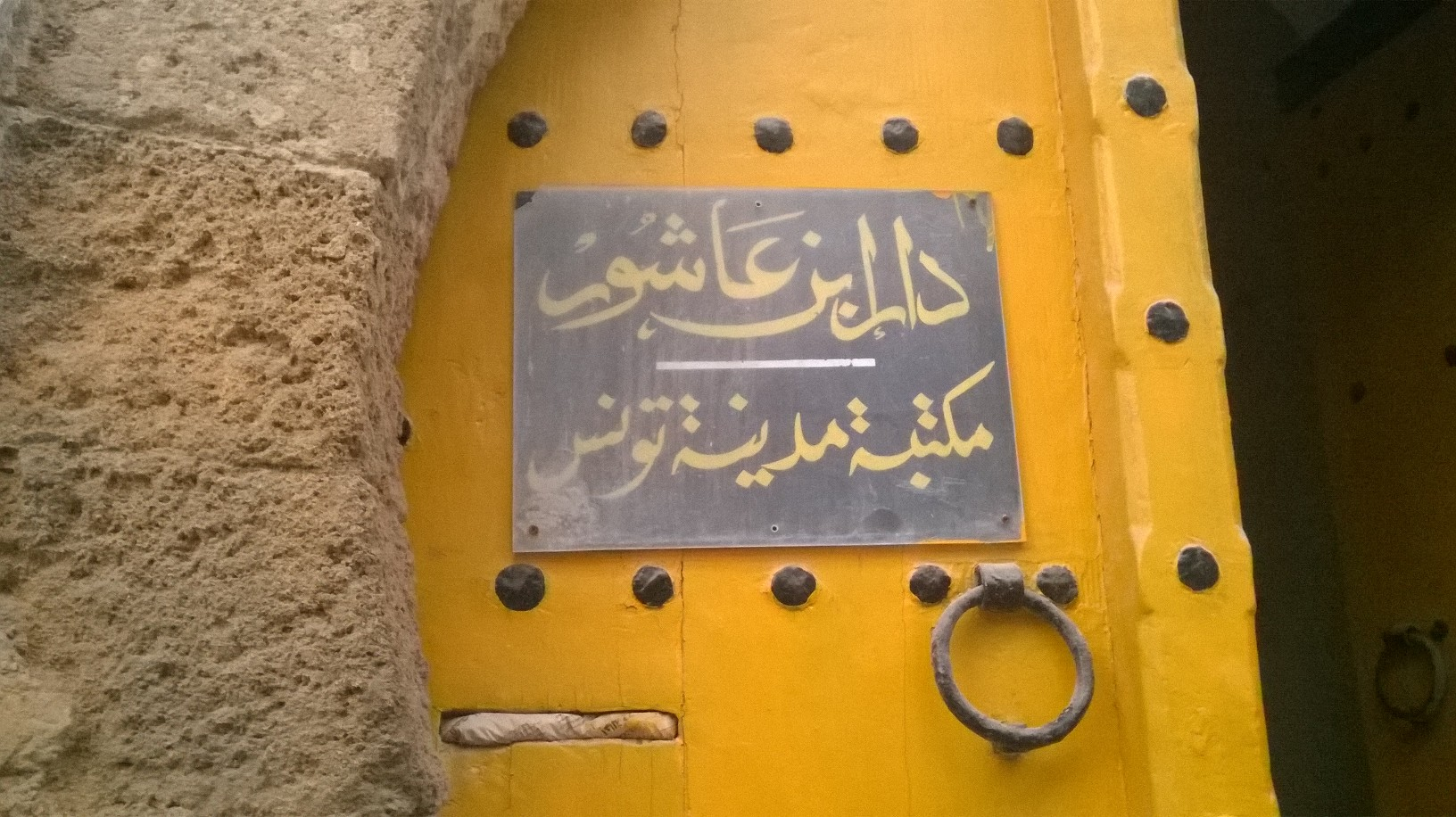
Dar Ben Achour: library of the city of Tunis.

It was occupied by Mohammed Aziz Bouattour, the Prime Minister of Tunisia from 1882 to 1907 and grandfather of Muhammad al-Tahir ibn Ashur. He bequeathed the house to the latter before it returned to Mohamed Fadhel Ben Achour.

The house was acquired in 1970 by the municipality of Tunis. After a restoration, it is transformed in 1983 into a library whose mission is to collect and preserve historical documents related to the city of Tunis and Tunisians. In 1990, it also became the headquarters of the Tunisian Association of Monuments and Sites.

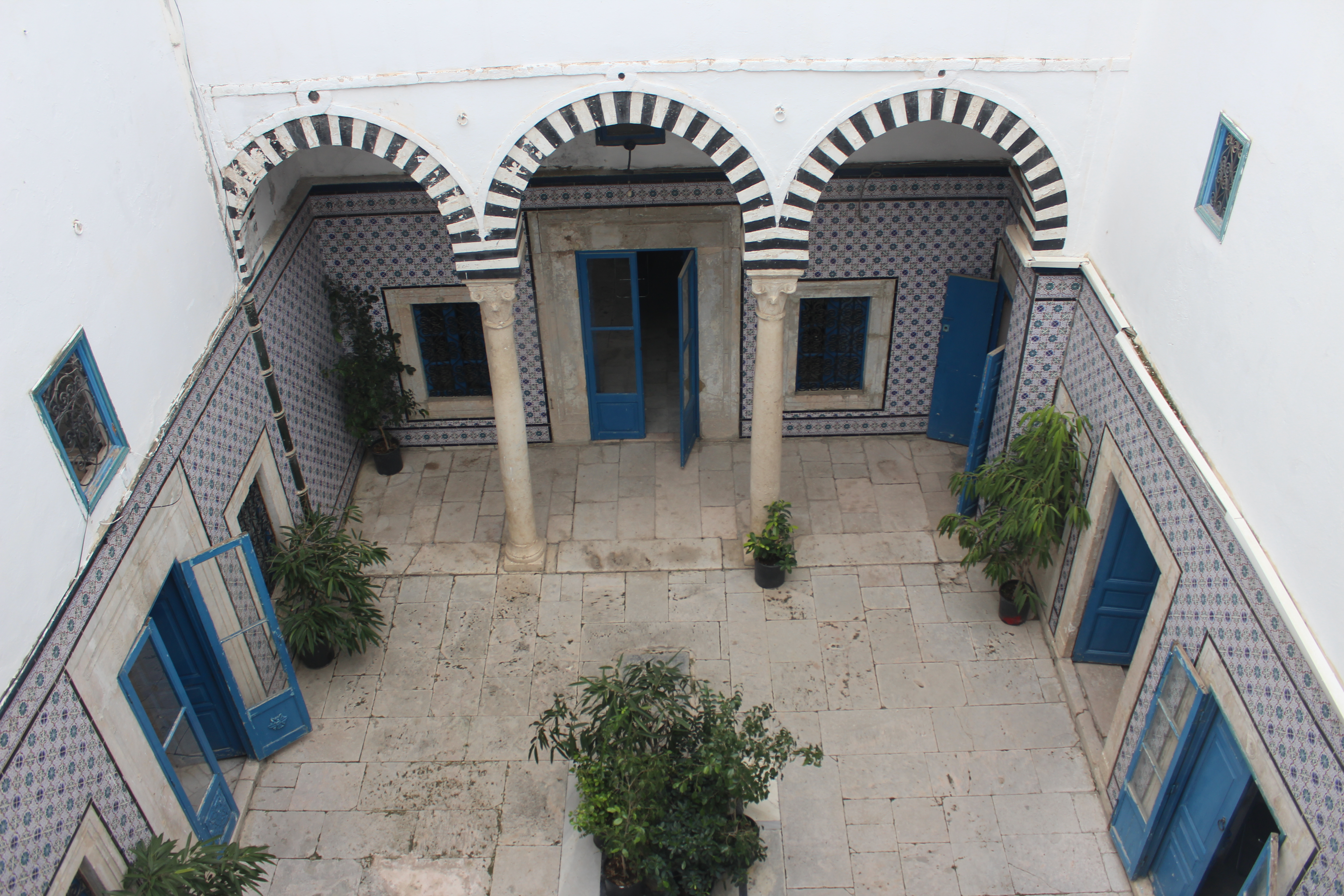
Dar Ben Achour courtyard.

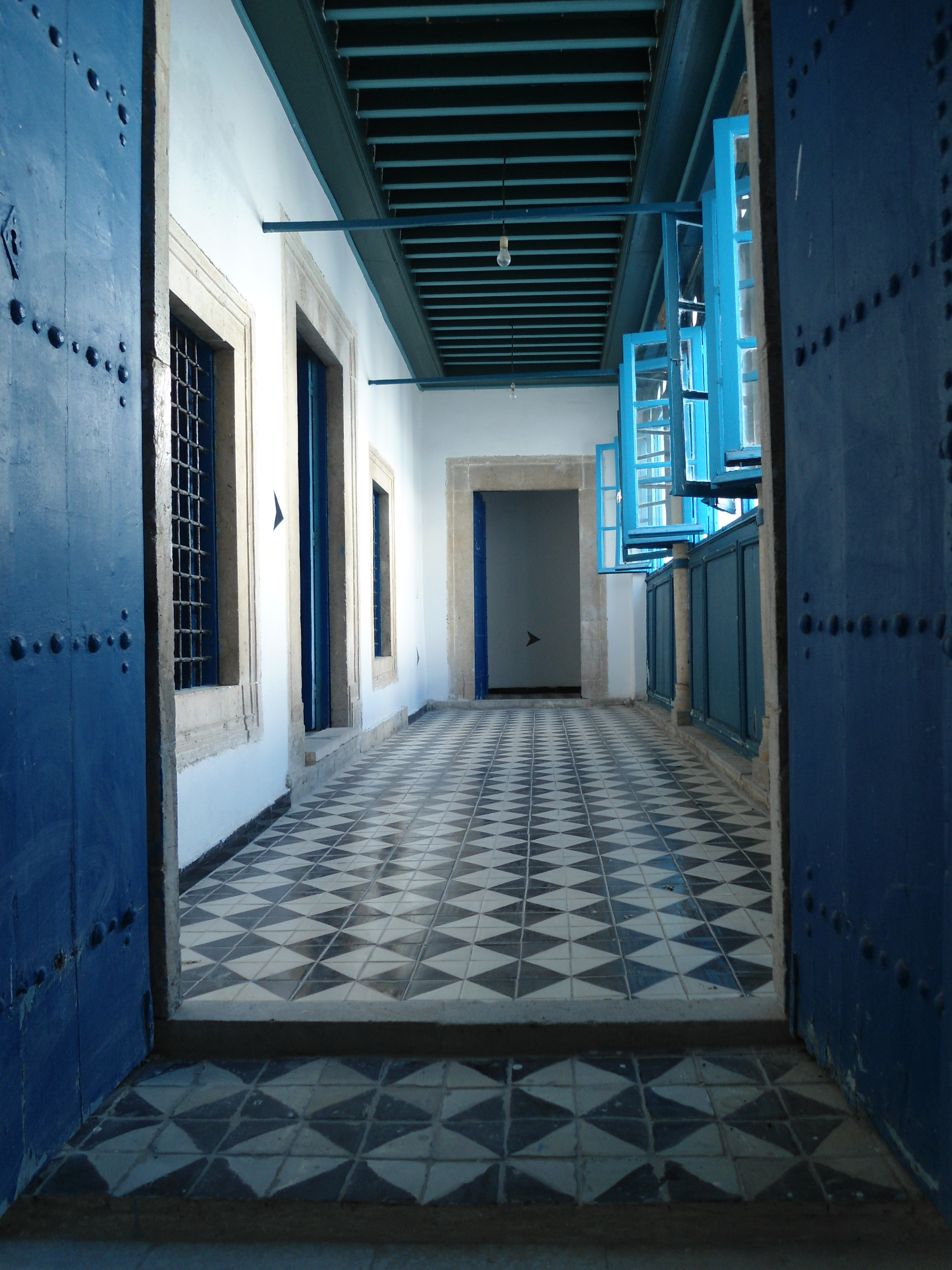
Dar Ben Achour's corridors

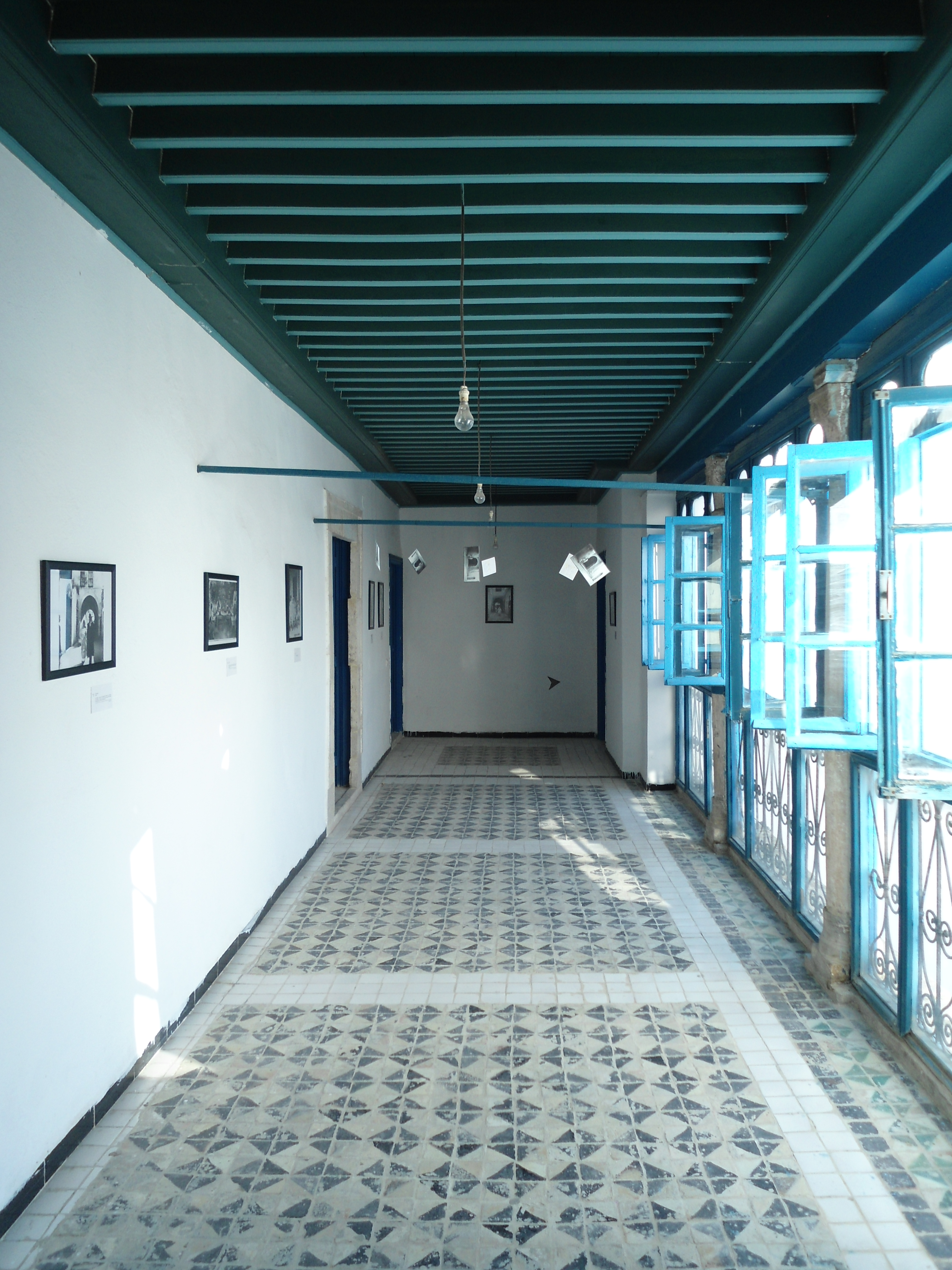
Dar Ben Achour's corridors 2

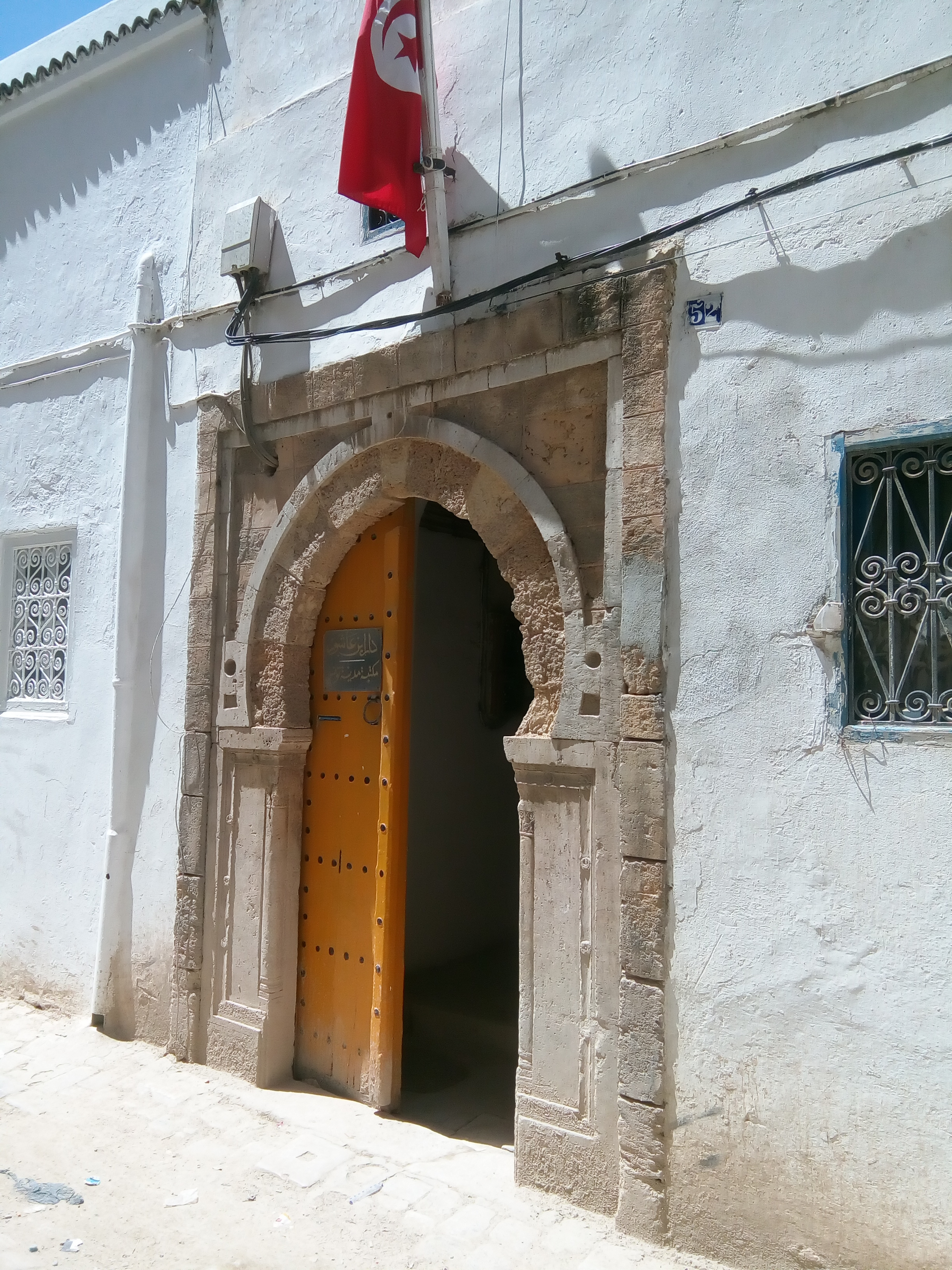
Entrance of Dar Ben Achour

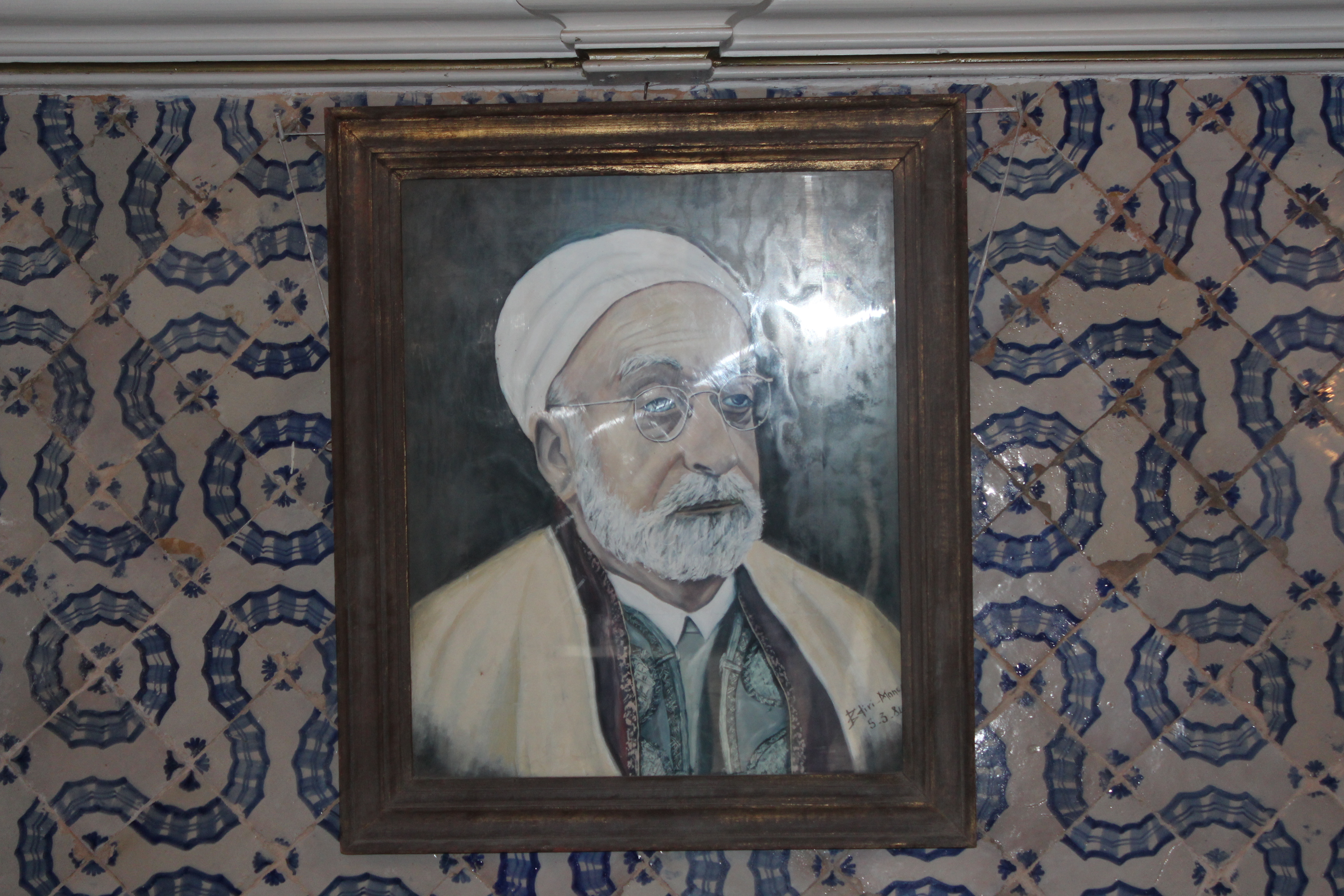
Photo of Tahar Ibn Ashur

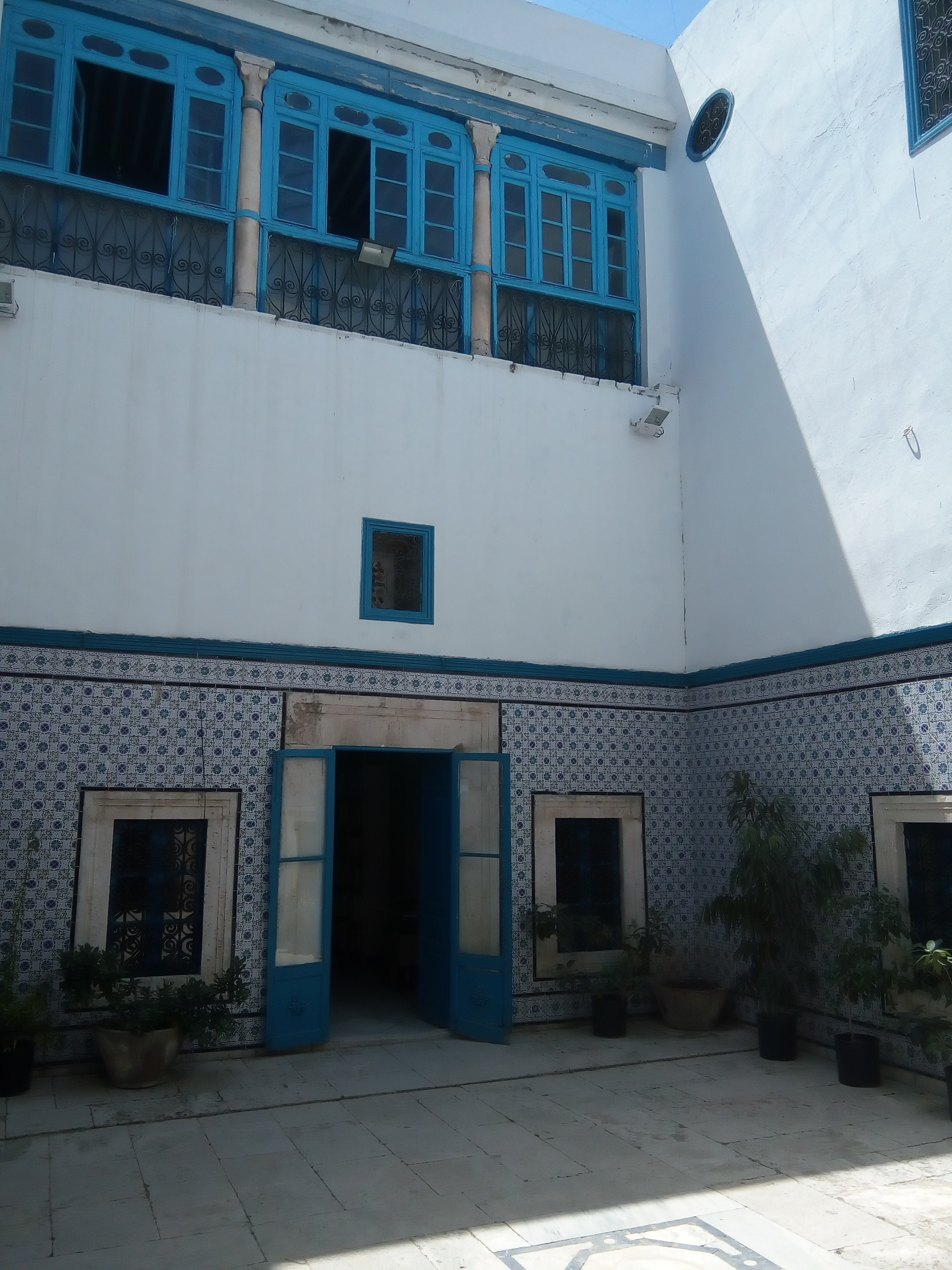
Dar ben Achour's balcony

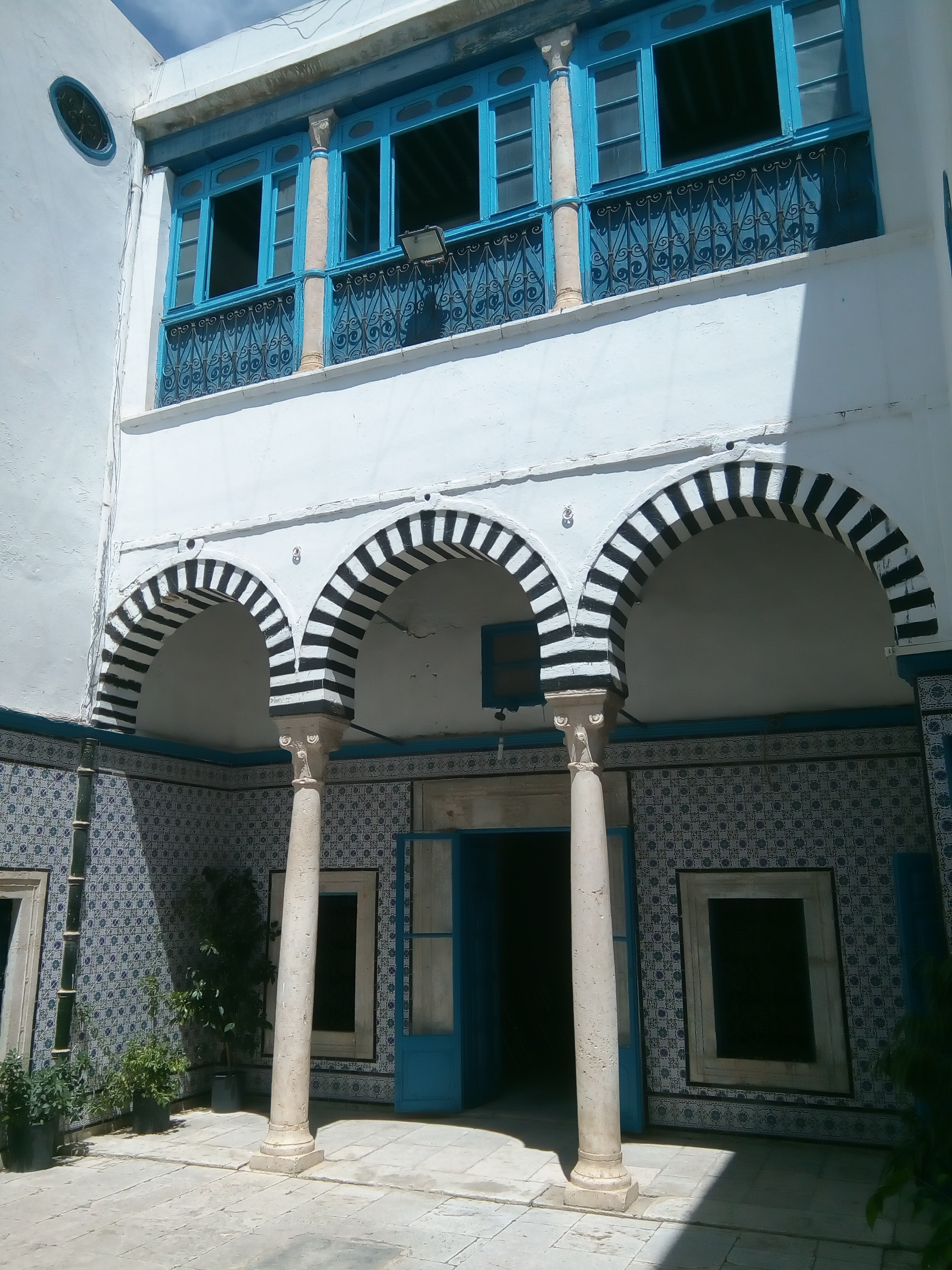
Dar ben Achour's arches

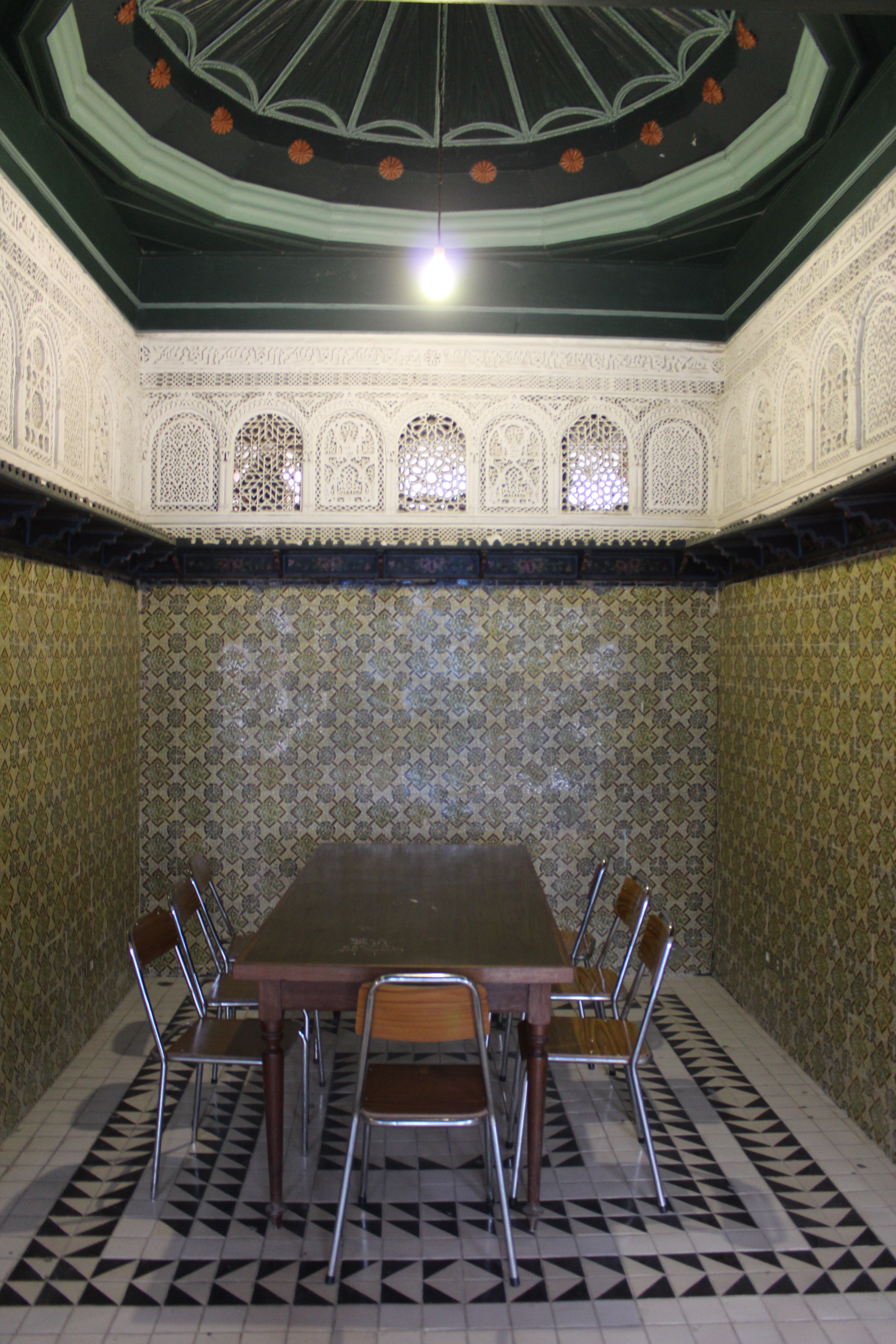
A Room in Dar Ben Achour
