= Tafsir Ibn Ashur =

Arabic Qur'anic exegesis by Ibn Ashur

- Author: Ibn Ashur
- Original title: تفسير التحرير والتنوير
- Translator: Various
- Language: Arabic
- Subject: Qur'anic exegesis (Tafsir)
- Genre: Islamic literature
- Published: 1984
- Publication place: Tunisia
- Media type: Print (hardcover and paperback)
- Pages: 30 volumes

Tafsir al-Tahrir wa al-Tanwir (Arabic: تفسير التحرير والتنوير, romanized: Tafsīr al-Taḥrīr wa al-Tanwīr, lit. 'Interpretation of Verification and Enlightenment'), commonly known as Tafsir Ibn Ashur (Arabic: تفسير ابن عاشور, romanized: Tafsīr Ibn ʿĀshūr), is a work of Qur'anic exegesis (tafsir) by Ibn Ashur, the contemporary Islamic scholar graduated from the University of Ez-Zitouna and the major figure within the Islamic Modernism movement. The book is a culmination of his fifty years of work, and Ibn Ashur poured in all of his innovative and reformist approaches toward hermeneutical engagement. His approach is most notably characterized by his emphasis on the rhetorical aspect (balagha) of the Qur'an, instead of relying completely on traditional interpretational science (riwaya) employed by other mufassirs (author of tafsir) whom Ibn Ashur criticized. Ibn Ashur criticized the methodology that relies on the opinions by their predecessors without adding little scientific values, by attacking how people are delusional in concerning about the contradictions between the divine message and traditions. The book was published in 1984 through Tunisian House of Publication, consisted of 30 volumes, and considered one of the most important contemporary Qur'anic exegesis to this day. It is written according to the theory of coherence (Nazm) by Abd al-Qahir al-Jurjani.

Tafsir al-Tahrir wa al-Tanwir was the first significant Quranic exegesis since al-Zamakhshari (d. 538/1143) to approach the entire Quran through the lens of its rhetorical aspects. Ibn `Ashur's tafsir not only surpasses Zamakhshari's tafsir (al-Kashshaf) in scope, but also delves much deeper into examining the language of the Quran.

== See also ==
- List of tafsir works
- List of Sunni books

== Sources ==
- M. Nafi, Basheer (2005). "Tāhir ibn ^{c}Āshūr: The Career and Thought of a Modern Reformist ^{c}ālim, with Special Reference to His Work of tafsīr". Journal of Qur'anic Studies. 7 (1): 1–32. doi:10.3366/jqs.2005.7.1.1. ISSN 1465-3591.
