= Higher Political Reform Commission =

The Higher Political Reform Commission (Arabic: اللجنة العليا للإصلاح السياسي) of Tunisia was formed on January 17, 2011 by Mohamed Ghannouchi, the Prime Minister of Tunisia. Its president is Yadh Ben Achour, legal expert and son of the late Grand Mufti of Tunisia Mohamed Fadhel Ben Achour. The Reform Commission is one of three committees formed by Ghannouchi to reform the government of Tunisia in 2011.

The Commission was charged with overseeing legal and constitutional reform in post-Ben Ali Tunisia., and been merged with the revolutionary Comité de protection de la révolution to form the Higher Authority for Realisation of the Objectives of the Revolution, Political Reform and Democratic Transition (Arabic: الهيئة العليا لتحقيق أهداف الثورة والاصلاح السياسي والانتقال الديمقراطي).
