= Higher Authority for Realisation of the Objectives of the Revolution, Political Reform and Democratic Transition =

- الهيئة العليا لتحقيق أهداف الثورة والإصلاح السياسي والانتقال الديمقراطي
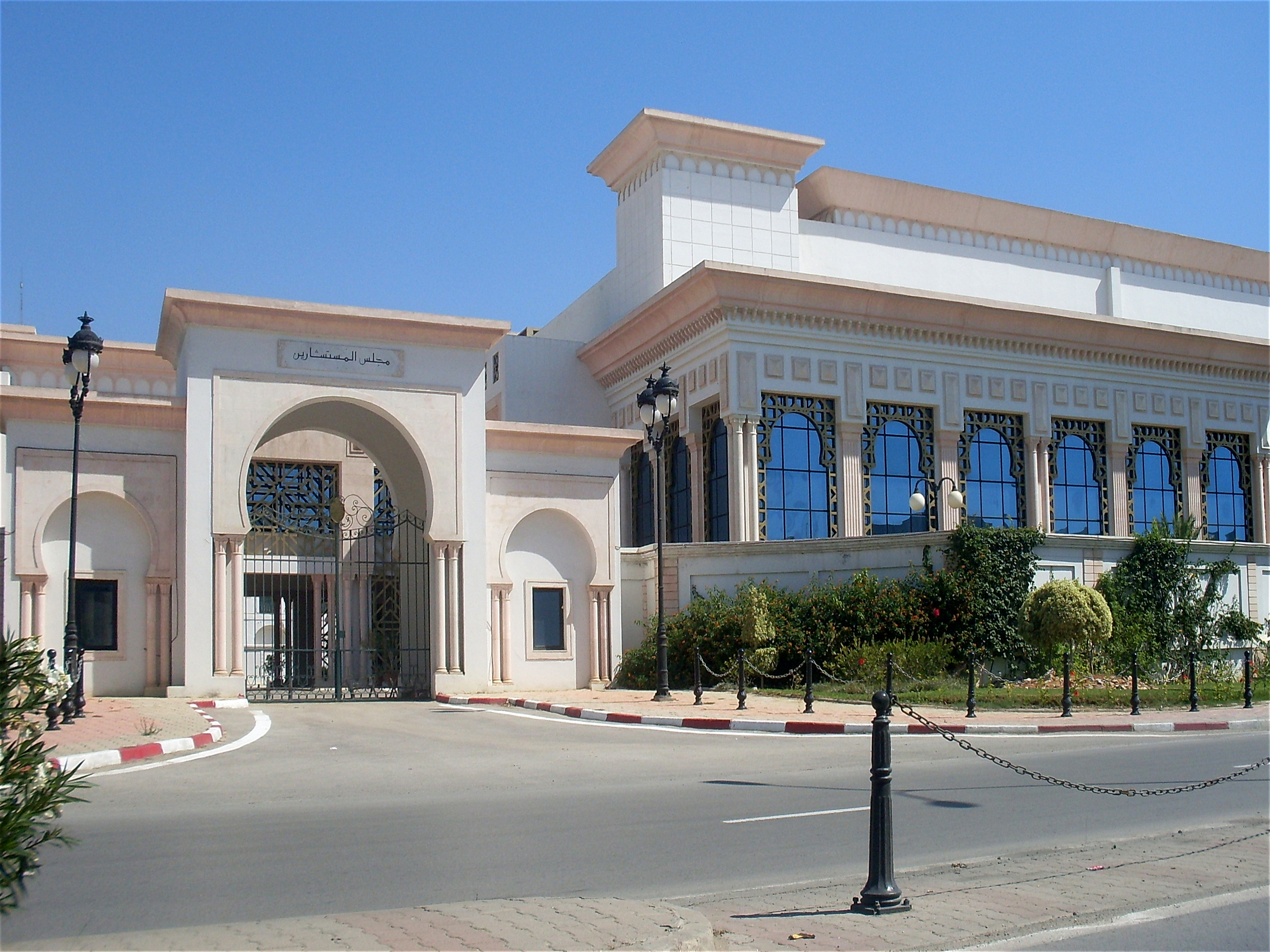
- Headquarters of the former Chamber of Advisors in Tunis

Agency overview
- Formed: March 15, 2011
- Preceding agencies: Conseil de défense de la révolution; Higher Political Reform Commission
- Dissolved: October 13, 2011
- Jurisdiction: Tunisia
- Headquarters: Tunis, Tunisia
- Agency executive: Yadh Ben Achour, President

The Higher Authority for Realisation of the Objectives of the Revolution, Political Reform and Democratic Transition (Arabic: الهيئة العليا لتحقيق أهداف الثورة والإصلاح السياسي والانتقال الديمقراطي, al-Hay’ah al-‘Ulyā li-Taḥqīq Ahdāf ath-Thawrah wal-Iṣlāḥ as-Siyāsī wal-Intiqāl ad-Dīmuqrāṭī) was a transitional authority in the aftermath of the Tunisian Revolution.

It was created on 15 March 2011 by merging of the Conseil de défense de la révolution and the shortlived Higher Political Reform Commission. Yadh Ben Achour was named president of the authority. Having finished its mission, the authority was dissolved on 13 October 2011.
