= Abdelmalek Ben Achour =

Tunisian sports administrator (1913–1997)

- Born: 8 December 1913; La Marsa, Tunisia
- Died: 4 January 1997 (aged 83); Tunis, Tunisia
- Occupation: Sport management
- Father: Muhammad al-Tahir ibn Ashur
- Relatives: Mohamed Fadhel Ben Achour (brother); Yadh Ben Achour (nephew); Sana Ben Achour (niece)

Abdelmalek Ben Achour (8 December 1913 – 4 January 1997) was a historic figure of Club Africain and of Tunisian football in general.

== Biography ==
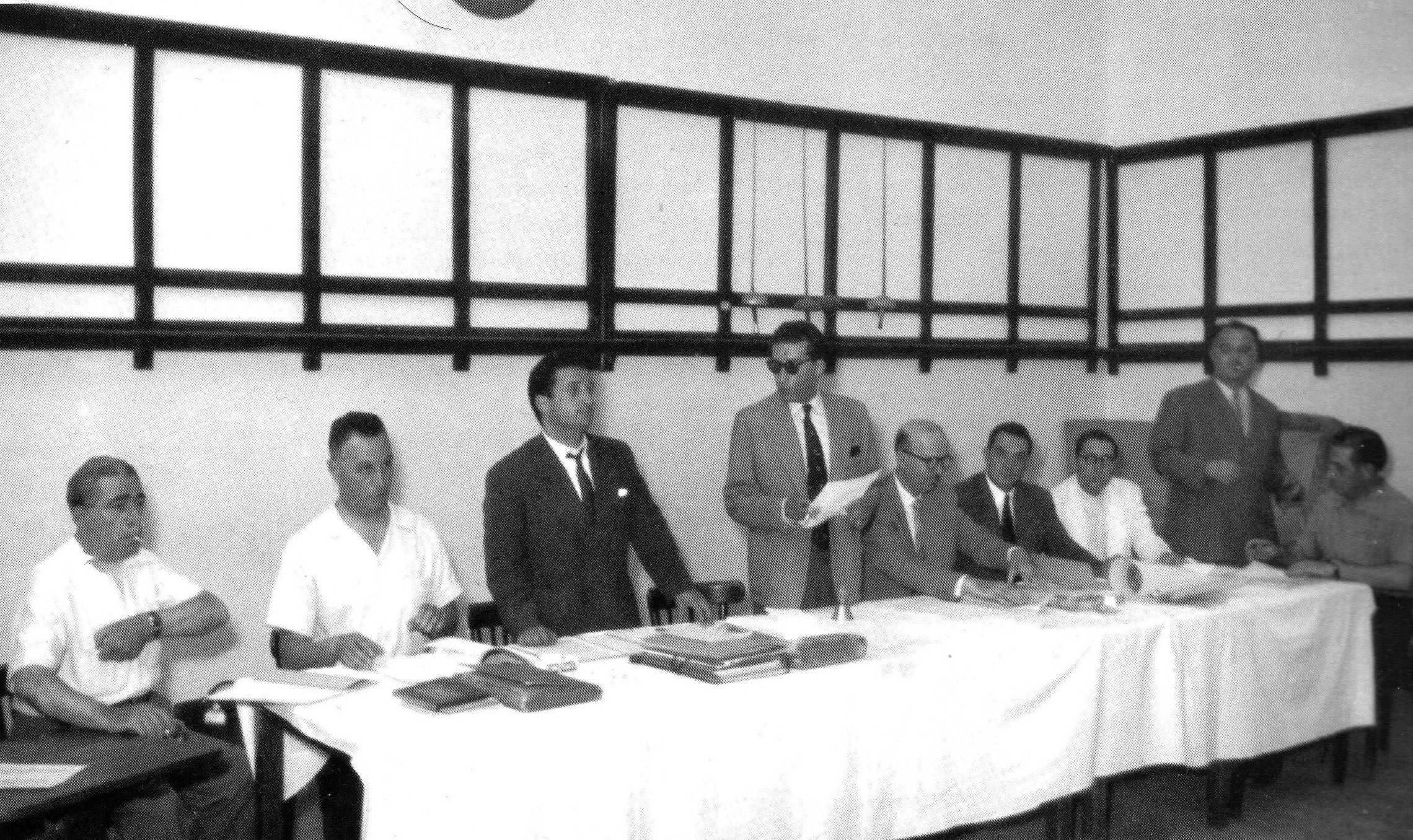
Meeting of the Tunisian Football Association League committee, featuring, among others, Abdelmalek Ben Achour and Chedly Zouiten.

Abdelmalek Ben Achour was born into a prominent family of scholars and religious figures, he was the son of Mohamed Tahar. He completed his primary and secondary education at Sadiki College, which set him on a path of intellectual pursuit, encouraged by his elder brother, Mohamed Fadhel, who was four years his senior. He married Radhia, the daughter of the minister Habib Djellouli, with whom he had a son, the historian Mohamed El Aziz, and three daughters.

At first glance, nothing suggested he would take an interest in sport. Yet, he discovered a calling for athletics and joined a specialized association, L'Orientale. It was only after securing a position within the state administration that he became involved in club life; encouraged by Mohieddine Bey, he joined Club Africain. He soon became a member of its executive board and took on the role of secretary-general, working closely alongside Moncef El Okby. As he considered how to secure the future of a club still basking in the glory of its back-to-back championship titles, he focused on the urgent need for a new generation of players to replace the team's veterans.

He then found himself embarking on an adventure of a different kind within the Tunisian Football Association League (LTFA). Those present at the annual general meeting held in July 1948 recount how Ben Achour caused a dramatic turn of events by announcing his candidacy for the presidency, much to the surprise of Chedly Zouiten, who had assumed he was the sole candidate to succeed the Frenchman Pietri Padoue. The situation shifted spectacularly in favor of the Club Africain general secretary, who was elected president by an overwhelming majority. In 1951, he also became the first non-French president of the Union of North African Football Leagues (ULNA).

With the advent of independence in 1956, he saw his national mission drawing to a close. On 10 June of that year, he attended his final Tunisian Cup final in his capacity as president of the Tunisian League, an event that also served as the first such final in independent Tunisia.

Three weeks later, he was appointed delegate to Bizerte and, concurrently, president of the provisional commission tasked with managing municipal affairs. Between 1957 and 1960, he also served as first vice-president of the Tunisian Olympic Committee. In 1962, he transitioned into the tourism sector, taking charge of a tourism development company in Gammarth and becoming the creator of the "Abou Nawas" hotel brand. Following a brief stint in the private sector, Abdelmalek Ben Achour was appointed secretary-general of the Tunisian Confederation of Industry, Trade and Handicrafts, his final professional role.
