= Tunisian Football Association League =

ULNA
- Short name: LTFA
- Founded: 1921
- Folded: 1956
- Location: Tunis, Tunisia
- ULNA affiliation: 1922–1956

The Tunisian Football Association League (LTFA) or simply, the Tunisian Football League, was a former association football federation responsible for organizing football competitions across all age categories within the French protectorate of Tunisia. It also oversaw a "corporate" division (for company-based teams), brought together football clubs, and managed local competitions.

== History ==
Founded in 1921 during the French protectorate of Tunisia, it became a member of the Union of North African Football Leagues in 1922 and organize Tunisian Championship and Tunisian Cup to compensate the Union of French Athletic Sports Societies (USFSA).

Following Tunisia's independence in 1956, it was replaced by the Tunisian Football Federation (FTF).

== Committees ==
The initial committees were composed almost exclusively of non-Tunisians. The first Tunisian to gain the privilege of serving as a member of the LTFA was Hamadi Bendif, a former goalkeeper for Racing Club de Tunis who later became a referee. Notably, he was part of the 1923–1924 committee, which included Bernard Sebout (president); Georges Roche, Adolphe Bellaiche, Armand Rey, and Louis Nicolas (vice-presidents); Marius Grasset (treasurer); Victor Soria (assistant treasurer); and Vincent Vella and Hamadi Bendif (members).

From 1928 onwards, a Tunisian member was always present on the steering committee: Ridha Kamoun (secretary-general of Espérance de Tunis) in 1928–1929, Hassen Karoui (treasurer of Club Africain from 1929 to 1931), Jameleddine Bousnina in 1931–1932, Chedly Zouiten in 1932–1933, and so on.

Following the Second World War, the principle of parity between Tunisians and French members was adopted, as was a system of alternating the presidency. The five elected Tunisians were generally Chedly Zouiten, Abdelmalek Ben Achour, Salomon Pariente, Hmida Hentati, and either Belhassen Chedly or Abdelhamid Bellamine.

For the 1950–1951 season, the LTFA committee consisted of Abdelmalek Ben Achour (president), Albert Valentin, Chedly Zouiten, and Pietri Padoue (vice-presidents), Salomon Pariente (secretary-general), Marc Orsoni (deputy secretary-general), Hmida Hentati (treasurer), René Charrac (deputy treasurer), Eugène Scemama and Belhassen Chedly (members), and Joseph Farina (administrative secretary). For the 1951–1952 season, in accordance with the rule for partial renewal, Valentin, Hentati, Charrac, and Chedly stepped down from the committee ahead of new elections held on 24 June 1951; the first three were re-elected, while Chedly was replaced by Mohamed Boudhina. The distribution of roles was adjusted to reflect the practice of alternating the presidency between a Tunisian and a Frenchman: Pietri Padoue (president), Abdelmalek Ben Achour and Chedly Zouiten (vice-presidents), Salomon Pariente (secretary-general), Marc Orsoni (deputy secretary-general), Hmida Hentati (treasurer), René Charrac (deputy treasurer), Eugène Scemama, Albert Valentin, and Mohamed Boudhina (members), and Joseph Farina (administrative secretary).

From 1952 to 1954, Abdelmalek Ben Achour served as president; he was re-elected during the assembly held on 20 June 1954, which resulted in the formation of the following committee: Ben Achour (president), Pietri Padoue, Chedly Zouiten, and Albert Valentin (vice-presidents), Marc Orsoni (deputy secretary-general), Hmida Hentati (treasurer), René Charrac (deputy treasurer), and Eugène Scemama and Abdelhamid Bellamine (members). This same committee remained in place for the final season, 1955–1956. It was supported by specialized commissions chaired by Mohamed Jouini (cup and championship), Boubaker Souaî (referees), Jules Barouh (administration of the Mutual Security Fund), Maurice Zarka (discipline), Édouard Scaramuzza (youth), Mohamed Deghim (corporate commission), Marc Orsoni (technical commission), Salomon Pariente (organization), and Mahmoud Bedir (regulations and qualifications).

== Presidents ==
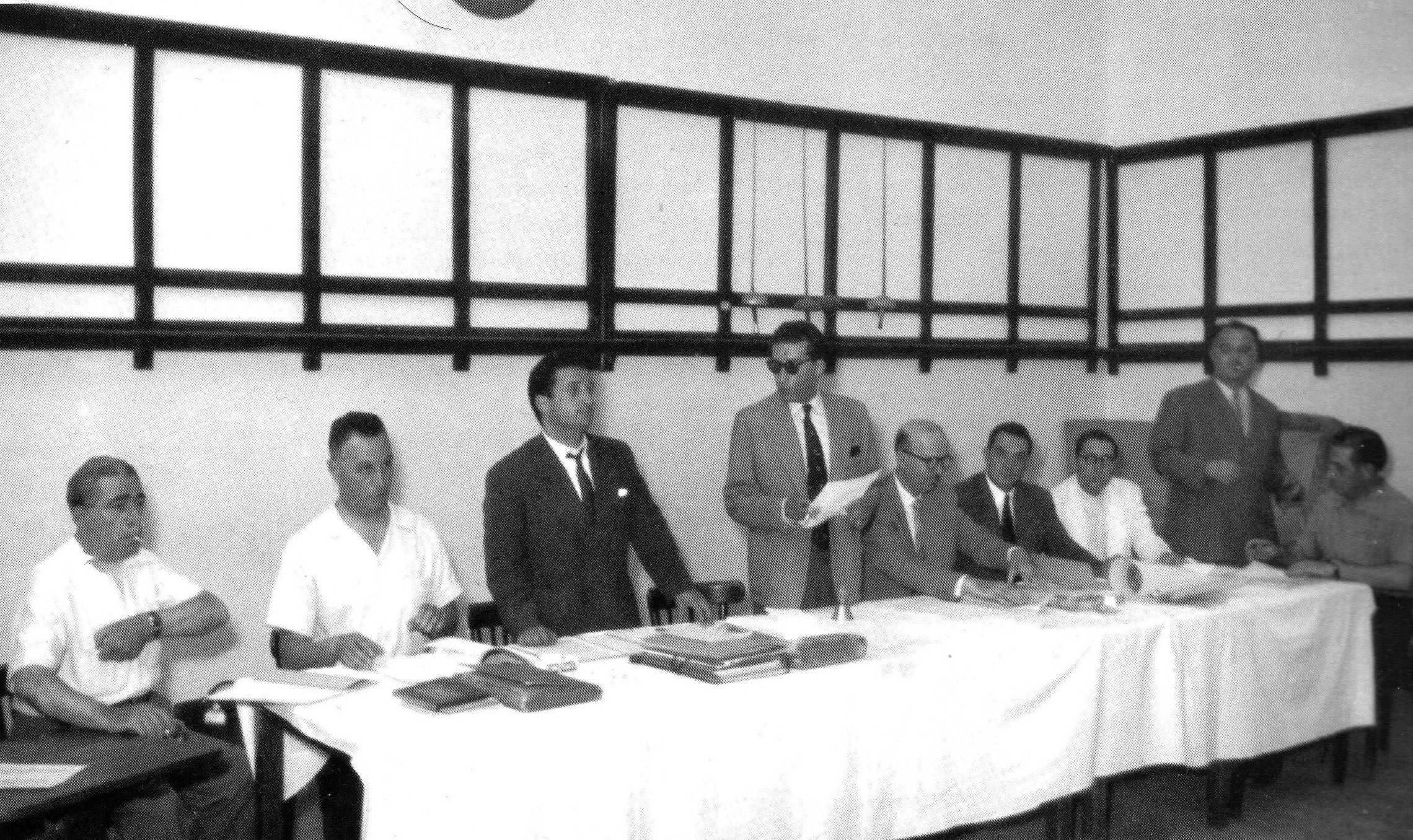
Meeting of the Tunisian Football Association League committee, featuring, among others, Abdelmalek Ben Achour and Chedly Zouiten.

- 1923–1927: Bernard Sebout
- 1927–1928: Paul Ghez
- 1928–1929: Georges Roche
- 1929–1933: Marcel Groët
- 1947–1948: Pietri Padoue
- 1948–1949: Chedly Zouiten
- 1949–1950: Pietri Padoue
- 1950–1951: Abdelmalek Ben Achour
- 1951–1952: Pietri Padoue (2)
- 1952–1956: Abdelmalek Ben Achour (2)

== Champions ==
=== Tunisian League ===
- 1921–22: Racing Club de Tunis
- 1922–23: Stade Gaulois
- 1923–24: Stade Gaulois
- 1924–25: Racing Club de Tunis
- 1925–26: Sporting Club de Tunis
- 1926–27: Stade Gaulois
- 1927–28: Sporting Club de Tunis
- 1928–29: Avant Garde
- 1929–30: US Tunis
- 1930–31: US Tunis
- 1931–32: Italia de Tunis
- 1932–33: US Tunis
- 1933–34: Sfax RS
- 1934–35: Italia de Tunis
- 1935–36: Italia de Tunis
- 1936–37: Italia de Tunis
- 1937–38: Savoia de La Goulette
- 1938–39: CS Gabésien
- 1939–40: No competition
- 1940–41: No competition
- 1941–42: Espérance de Tunis
- 1942–43: No competition
- 1943–44: No competition
- 1944–45: CA Bizertin
- 1945–46: CA Bizertin
- 1946–47: Club Africain
- 1947–48: Club Africain
- 1948–49: CA Bizertin
- 1949–50: Étoile du Sahel
- 1950–51: CS Hammam-Lif
- 1951–52: No competition
- 1952–53: Sfax RS
- 1953–54: CS Hammam-Lif
- 1954–55: CS Hammam-Lif

=== Tunisian Cup ===
- 1922–23: Avant Garde
- 1923–24: Racing Club de Tunis
- 1924–25: Stade Gaulois
- 1925–26: Racing Club de Tunis
- 1926–27: Stade Gaulois
- 1927–28: No competition
- 1928–29: No competition
- 1929–30: US Tunis
- 1930–31: US Tunis
- 1931–32: Racing Club de Tunis
- 1932–33: US Tunis
- 1933–34: US Tunis
- 1934–35: US Tunis
- 1935–36: Italia de Tunis
- 1936–37: Stade Gaulois
- 1937–38: Sporting Club de Tunis
- 1938–39: Espérance de Tunis
- 1939–40: No competition
- 1940–41: No competition
- 1941–42: US Ferryville
- 1942–43: No competition
- 1943–44: No competition
- 1944–45: Olympique de Tunis
- 1945–46: PFC Bizerte
- 1946–47: CS Hammam-Lif
- 1947–48: CS Hammam-Lif
- 1948–49: CS Hammam-Lif
- 1949–50: CS Hammam-Lif
- 1950–51: CS Hammam-Lif
- 1951–52: No competition
- 1952–53: No competition
- 1953–54: CS Hammam-Lif
- 1954–55: CS Hammam-Lif
