= Truth and Dignity Commission (Tunisia) =

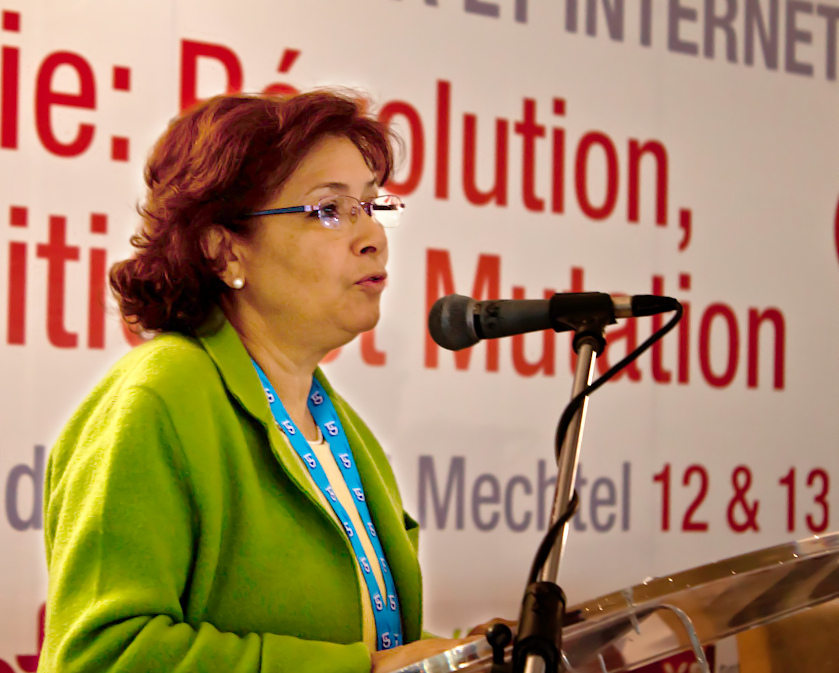
Sihem Bensedrine, President of the Commission, speaking in 2012

The Truth and Dignity Commission (Arabic: هيئة الحقيقة والكرامة, romanized: Hai'at ul-Ḥaqiqa wul-Karāma; French: Instance Vérité et Dignité) is an independent tribunal established by law in Tunisia on 23 December 2013 and formally launched on 9 June 2014 by then-President Moncef Marzouki. Established following the Tunisian Revolution, its purpose is to investigate gross human rights violations committed by the Tunisian State since 1955 and to provide compensation and rehabilitation to victims. The Commission was given a four-year mandate (i.e. to 2018) with the possibility of a one-year extension. Its president is the human rights activist Sihem Bensedrine.

== Final report ==
Bensedrine revealed the commission's final report on March 26, 2019. The 2,000-page, Arabic-language record of human rights abuses is available online. Among the offenses mentioned in the report are unfair trials in 1963 regarding an attempted military coup against President Habib Bourguiba; Tunisia's late president, Béji Caïd Essebsi, was involved in those trials as then-director of national security.

== Process ==
The Commission, which was designed to use judicial and non-judicial mechanisms, began gathering testimonies from victims of abuse under the old regime in September 2015. It continued to accept new cases until a cut-off date for registrations in June 2016, by which time it had received over 62,000 submissions and heard testimony from about 11,000 people. The Commission held its first public hearing in Tunis on 17 November 2016.

The Commission has faced criticism on a number of grounds, including the slowness of its operations, the basis of its approach, and the fitness of its president, among others. As a result of ongoing concerns, there was a delay in the parliamentary vote to approve the Commissions's budget for 2017 although it was eventually agreed by 121 votes to 28 with 21 abstentions.

The Commission's members, as of late 2016, were Sihem Bensedrine (president), Ibtihel Abdellatif, Oula Ben Nejma, Mohammed Ben Salem, Ali Gherab, Khaled Krichi, Adel Maïzi, Hayet Ouertani and Slaheddine Rached.
