= Abdelkader Ben Khemis =

Tunisian politician (1942–2016)

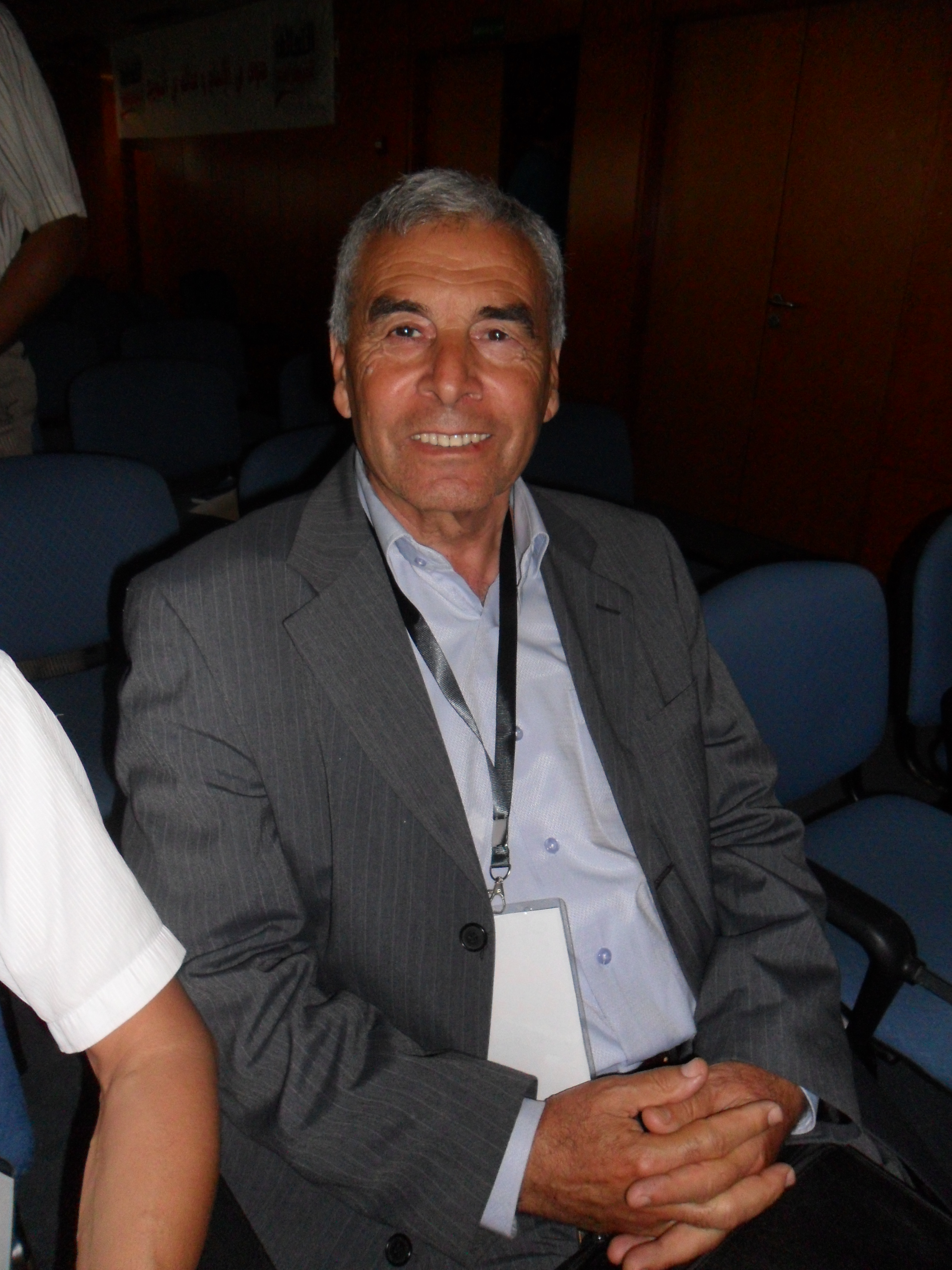
- Abdelkader Ben Khemis in June 2013

Member of League of Human Rights - France

Personal details
- Born: 10 December 1942 Le Kef (Tunisia)
- Died: 15 August 2016 (aged 73)
- Party: Democratic Forum for Labour and Liberties (Ettakatol)
- Occupation: Lawyer
- Profession: Human right activist Politician

Abdelkader Ben Khemis (Arabic: عبد القادر بن خميس), born on 10 December 1942 in El Kef and died on 15 August 2016, was a Tunisian politician.

== Biography ==
=== A professor and an opposition figure ===
He graduated as a Doctor in organic chemistry in 1980, Abdelkader Ben Khemis was a master lecturer at National School of Engineering of Gabes of University of Gabes. This was before taking a teaching profession in Monastir. He was also a member of the Higher Education Union. An opposition figure in Kef Governorate he was a founding member of Democratic Forum for Labour and Liberties (Ettakatol).He resigned from the party, to become independent. He joined Al Joumhouri, then the Democratic Alliance, before being admitted to the Democratic and Social Way. On 1 March 2001, (as reported by Libération) "he was brutalized by the police while he was attending a private ceremony organized by CNLT .

On 9 February 2006, he was "arrested in front of his home in Monastir by government agents and was interrogated for 3 hours at the headquarters of the National Security District, as reported by CNLT spokeswoman, Sihem Bensedrine.

=== Death ===
Abdelkader Ben Khemis Died on 15 August 2016 as a result of an illness. He is buried in Charfine Cemetery.
