= Chedly Zouiten =

President of Tunisian Football Federation
- In office 1957–1962
- Preceded by: Office established
- Succeeded by: Mohammed Mzali

Personal details
- Born: 11 November 1901 Monastir, Tunisia
- Died: 1 August 1963 (aged 61) Tunisia
- Occupation: Dentist; Sport management

Chedly Zouiten (11 November 1901 – 1 August 1963), was a historic figure who holds a prominent place in the history of Espérance Sportive de Tunis and Tunisian football in general. He was the first president of the Tunisian Football Federation (FTF) between 1957 and 1962.

== Biography ==
As the first Tunisian dental surgeon, a profession he practiced in his private practice in Tunis, he joined Espérance de Tunis in 1922, initially as a player and later serving as its president for over forty years.

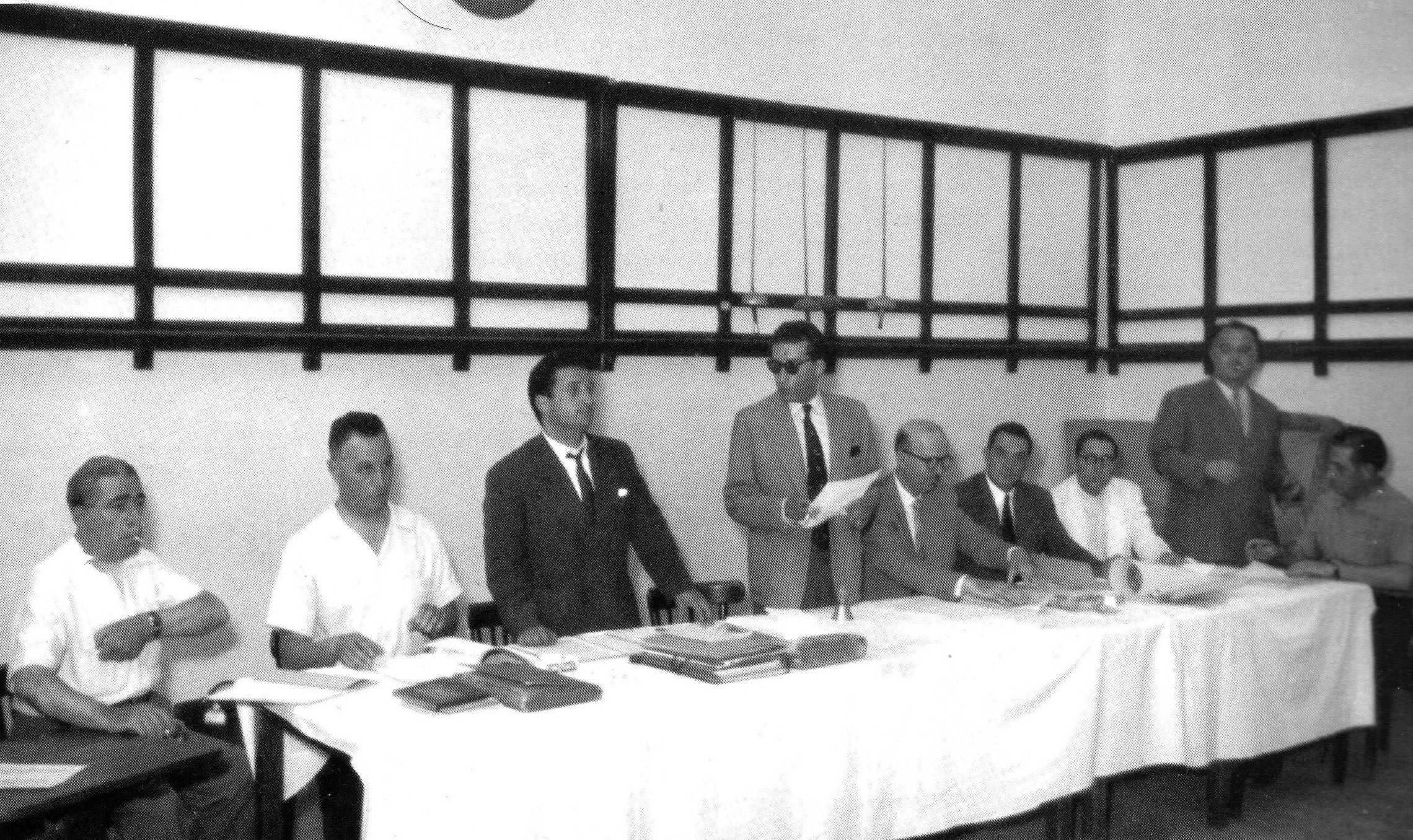
Meeting of the Tunisian Football Association League committee, featuring, among others, Abdelmalek Ben Achour and Chedly Zouiten.

In 1924, Zouiten introduced the colors still used by Espérance de Tunis today the red and yellow. In 1942, he gave the club its current name. Under his leadership, the organization became increasingly involved in the struggle for Tunisian independence, thereby forging a deeper connection with the working classes of Tunisian society, the very foundation from which Espérance draws its enduring popularity.

His capabilities led him to hold multiple roles simultaneously, including positions with Espérance, the Tunisian Football Association League (LTFA), the Confederation of African Football (CAF), the Tunisian Red Crescent, and the Tunisian Olympic Committee, all of which enabled him to manage Espérance with a firm hand. At the age of 23, he sought his first term as president, followed by a second in 1930.

He held this position continuously until his death. During this period, between 1957 and 1962, he served as president of the Tunisian Football Federation (FTF). On 1 August 1963, he was killed in a road accident on the GP1 highway near Bir Bouregba while returning from Monastir.

== Personal life ==
The son of the jurist Youssef Zouiten and Aïcha Bourguiba, he was the brother of Smaïn Zouitenn a jurist, former Qaid of Tunis, and the first director of national security following independence and of Ahmed Zouiten, another prominent figure in Tunisian football.

He had a daughter, Neïla, who would go on to marry Jean-Claude Habib Bourguiba, son of the president of Tunisia, Habib Bourguiba.

== Legacy ==
Today, the Chedly Zouiten Stadium in Tunis bears his name.
