= Zakia Dhifaoui =

Tunisian human rights activist

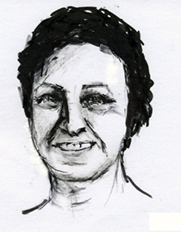
- drawings by Lolatta
- Citizenship: Tunisia
- Occupations: Tunisia teacher, journalist and human rights activist
- Organization(s): Member of the Democratic forum for labour and liberties in 2007
- Known for: Activism: fought against the regime of zinel Abidine Ben Ali before the Tunisia revolution of 2011
- Notable work: Founding members of the national council for liberties in Tunisia Participated in the creation of the Arabic weekly mouwatinoun

Zakia Dhifaoui is a Tunisian teacher, journalist, and human rights activist who fought against the regime of Zine el-Abidine Ben Ali before the Tunisian revolution of 2011.

== Biography ==
Originally from Kairouan, a city 150 kilometers southwest of Tuniset and fifty kilometers west of Sousse, she began her career as a history and geography teacher in a high school in that city in 1994.

A member of the Democratic Forum for Labor and Liberties (also called Ettakatol), an initially clandestine party, in January 2007, she participated in the creation of the Arabic weekly Mouwatinoun. She is one of the founding members of the National Council for Liberties in Tunisia; she is also a member of the Anti-Torture Association in Tunisia and the local section of the Tunisian Human Rights League.

In July 2008, she decided to go to Redeyef to collect testimonies with families involved in the Gafsa strikes. The situation was very tense in Tunisia. President Ben Ali, who had already been in power for 21 years, announced his intention to run for fifth term.

Upon her arrival on 27 July, she participated in a women's demonstration in solidarity with the striking workers. She was, however, arrested with six other protesters, and sexually assaulted. On 14 August 2008, she was sentenced by the Gafsa Court to eight months in prison. She was charged with "insubordination, disturbances of public order, obstruction of an official in the performance of his duties, deterioration of the property of others and breach of morality." She remained in detention for 200 days, before receiving a pardon on the occasion of the twenty-first anniversary of President Ben Ali's coming to power.

Upon leaving prison, however, the Minister of Education did not allow her to continue her teaching job, but she fought to return to her job while striving to find temporary jobs. Following the Tunisian revolution and ousting of Zine el-Abidine Ben Ali, on 14 January 2011, then to the general amnesty law of 19 February 2011 she could finally resume her post and her classes in Kairouan, while having lost the benefit of several years.

She continued to campaign in various organizations, including Ettakatol, but also kept her support for the group Tunisians of Redeyef. She also continued to write for the periodical Mouwatinoun.
