= Yadh Ben Achour =

Tunisian lawyer

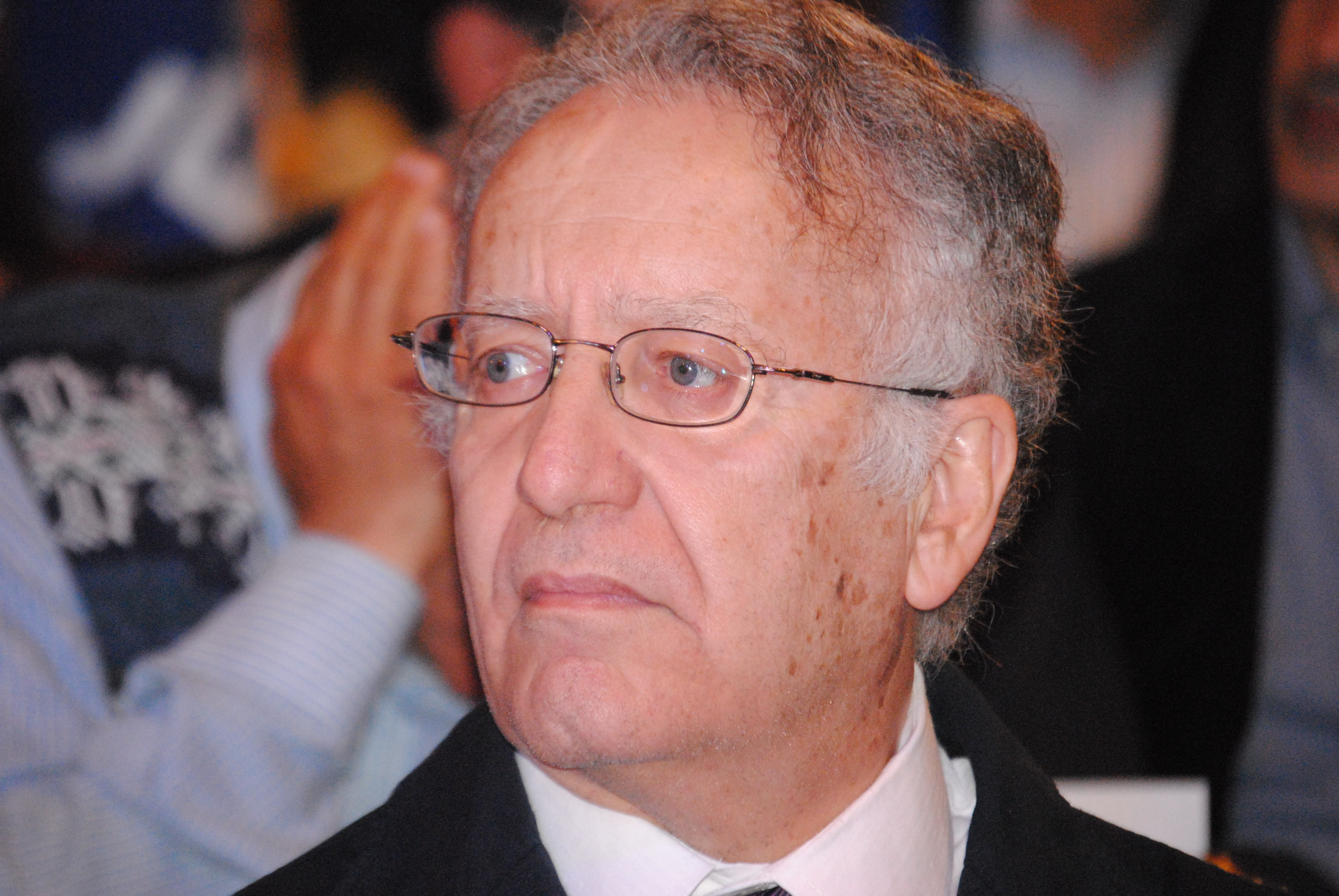
Yadh Ben Achour, President of the Higher Political Reform Commission of Tunisia.

Yadh Ben Achour (Arabic: عياض بن عاشور, also Iyadh Ben Achour, born 1 June 1945) is a Tunisian lawyer, expert on public law and Islamic political theory. President of the Higher Political Reform Commission of Tunisia, he is then member of the United Nations Human Rights Committee.

== Biography ==
Yadh Ben Achour was born in La Marsa into a family of scholars, magistrates and high officials of the Tunisian high bourgeoisie. His father Mohamed Fadhel Ben Achour was the Mufti of Tunisia from 1962 to 1970. His Grandfather Muhammad al-Tahir ibn Ashur was one of the most renowned modern-era graduates of University of Ez-Zitouna and one of the great Islamic scholars of the 20th century.

In 1992, Yadh Ben Achour resigned from the Constitutional Council on the grounds of President Zine El Abidine Ben Ali's attempt to control the Tunisian Human Rights League through a reform of the law on associations. From 1993 to 1999 he served as Dean of the Faculty of Legal, Political and Social Sciences at the University of Carthage.

Member of the Tunisian Academy of Sciences, Letters, and Arts, of the tunisian Economic and Social Council and of the Board of Senghor University. He is elected as a member of the United Nations Human Rights Committee in 2012.

On January 17, 2011 Mohamed Ghannouchi, the prime minister of Tunisia, appointed him to be the president of Tunisia's Higher Political Reform Commission, which is charged with overseeing constitutional reform in post-Ben Ali Tunisia.

Ben Achour advocated a radical paradigm shift that would allow for the rethinking of Islam as a cultural and religious system and subvert ideological and dogmatic constructs with hegemonic claims. He has developed an inclusive approach which seeks to deal with the islamic culture in its entirety, including elements characterised by the representatives of orthodoxy as heterodox, and therefore marginalised and repressed. He has adopted a multifaceted and holistic approach which looks between traditional dogma and axioms.

He has received many national and international awards, and recognition for his outstanding scientific work.

== Honours and awards ==
=== Honours ===
- Commander of the Order of the Republic (Tunisia)
- Grand officier of the National Order of Merit of Tunisia
- Commander of the Ordre des Palmes académiques (France)

=== Awards ===
- 2012 : International Prize for Democracy (Bonn)
- 2017 : Tahar Haddad Prize for the Promotion of Studies and Research in the Humanities (Tunis)
- 2025 : Boutros Boutros-Ghali Prize for Peace and Knowledge (Cairo)

=== Honorary degrees ===
- 2004 : Laurentian University
- 2017 : University of Geneva
- 2017 : Aix-Marseille University

== Main publications ==
- L’État nouveau et la philosophie politique et juridique occidentale, Tunis, ed. Tunis University, 1980
- Droit administratif, Tunis, ed. Tunis University, 1982
- Politique, religion et droit dans le monde arabe, Tunis, ed. Cérès éditions, 1992
- Normes, foi et loi en particulier dans l'islam, Tunis, ed. Cérès éditions, 1993
- Souveraineté étatique et protection internationale des minorités, Leiden, ed. Collected Courses of the Hague Academy of International Law, 1994
- Contentieux administratif, Tunis, ed. Cérès éditions, 1995
- (ar) Conscience et droit : l’esprit civique et les droits modernes (الضمير و القانون : الروح المدنية و الحقوق الحديثة), Beirut-Casablanca, ed. Arab Cultural Center, 1998
- Le rôle des civilisations dans le système international : droit et relations internationales, Brussels, ed. Bruylant, 2003
- Introduction générale au droit, Tunis, ed. Centre de publication universitaire, 2005
- La Cour européenne des droits de l'homme et la liberté de religion, Paris, ed. Pedone, 2005
- Aux fondements de l'orthodoxie sunnite, Paris, ed. Presses universitaires de France, 2008
- La tentazione democratica. Politica, religione e diritto nel mondo arabo, Verona, ed. Ombre Corte, 2010
- La deuxième Fâtiha. L'islam et la pensée des droits de l'homme, Paris, ed. Presses universitaires de France, 2011
- An International Constitutional Court: Bulwark against the Erosion of Constitutional Democracy, in Constitutionalism, Human Rights and Islam after the Arab Spring(eds. Rainer Grote, Tilmann Röder and Ali El-Haj, Oxford/New York, ed. Oxford University Press, 2016)
- Quel islam pour l'Europe ? (with François Dermange), Geneva, ed. Labor et Fides, 2017
- Tunisie : une révolution en pays d’islam, Geneva, ed. Labor et Fides, 2018
- L'Islam et la démocratie : Une révolution intérieure, Paris, ed. Gallimard, 2020
- Tunisie dix ans et dans dix ans (collective work), Tunis, ed. Leaders, 2021
- The Islamic Question Before the United Nations Human Rights Committee, Naples-Ferrara, ed. Jovene / Università degli Studi di Ferrara, 2021
- La révolution, une espérance, Paris, ed. Fayard / Collège de France, 2022.
- La question islamique devant le Comité des Droits de l’Homme des Nations Unies, Paris, ed. Pedone, 2022
- L’éthique des révolutions, Paris, ed. Maison des sciences de l’homme, 2023
- Poèmes sur la Liberté, Tunis, ed. AC Éditions, 2025
