= Naziha Réjiba =

Tunisian journalist

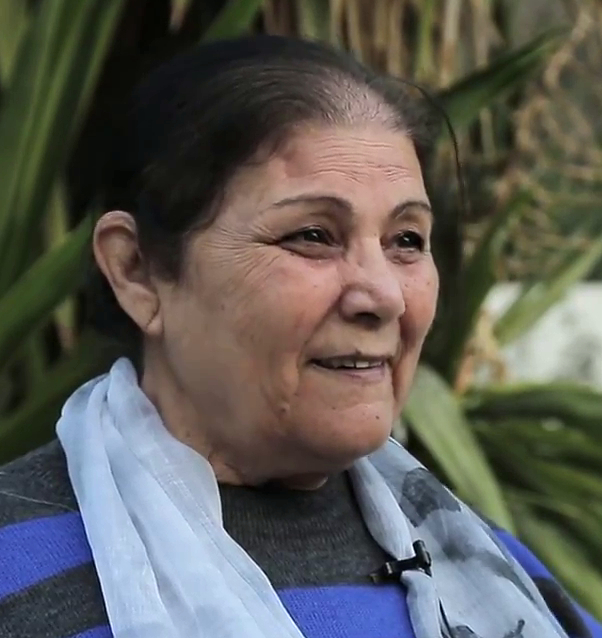
- Born: Tunisia
- Citizenship: Tunisia
- Occupation: Journalist
- Employer: Sihem Bensedrine
- Awards: International Press Freedom Award from the Committee to Protect Journalists

Naziha Réjiba (Tunisian Arabic: نزيهة رجيبة) also known as Om Ziad (أم زياد) is a Tunisian journalist. She edits the online journal Kalima. She is a laureate of the International Press Freedom Award.

== Career ==
In 2000, Réjiba co-founded Kalima, along with Sihem Bensedrine. In 2001, Réjiba and Bensedrine set up Observatoire de la Liberté de la Presse, de L'Edition et de la Création (OLPEC), a group that promotes freedom of the press and which is banned in Tunisia.

Réjiba has repeatedly been harassed by the Tunisian government. She has repeatedly been interrogated by police, and she is under constant surveillance. Kalima is blocked in Tunisia. In 2007, Rejiba received a series of anonymous threats and was the target of a smear campaign involving obscene, fabricated photographs of her husband. In 2008, vandals hacked into the Kalima web page, shutting it down. Réjiba accused the government of being responsible for vandalism in an article, and was summoned to court.

During an interview with the Committee to Protect Journalists (CPJ), Naziha Réjiba was asked why she believed she was being targeted. In response, she said:

It has to do with the general political situation in my country: the occupation of parts of the country by foreign armies, the stranglehold of the regime on the democratic process and the ban on political activities. In such a context of heightened intolerance, the media are the only way to express oneself. In the fight for the recovery of our civil and political rights, Le Potentiel, which is known for its pro-democracy stand and editorial independence became a favored target for the powers that be. All the arrests and harassment are the expression of their desire to silence us.

— Committee to Protect Journalists (CPJ), Interview with Modeste Mutinga, November 2000

== Awards and honours ==
In 2009, she won an International Press Freedom Award from the Committee to Protect Journalists. The award is given for journalists who show courage in defending press freedom in the face of attacks, threats or imprisonment.
