= Mohamed Fadhel Ben Achour =

Tunisian theologian, writer, trade unionist, intellectual and patriot

- محمد الفاضل بن عاشور
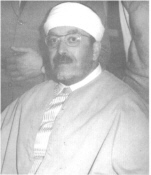
- Portrait photograph of Mohamed Fadhel Ben Achour
- Born: 1909 (age 116–117); La Marsa, Tunisia
- Died: 1970 (age 55–56)
- Occupations: writer, trade unionist, intellectual
- Father: Muhammad al-Tahir ibn Ashur
- Relatives: Abdelmalek Ben Achour (brother); Yadh Ben Achour (son); Sana Ben Achour (daughter)

Mohamed Fadhel Ben Achour (Arabic: محمد الفاضل بن عاشور; October 16, 1909 – April 20, 1970) was a Tunisian theologian, writer, trade unionist, intellectual and patriot born in La Marsa.

== Biography ==
Born October 16, 1909, in a family of Scholars, Magistrates and High Officials of the upper middle class of Tunisia, he began to learn the Quran and Arabic grammar from the age of three years. He also learns French language at the age of nine. He made his entry in 1922 in University of Ez-Zitouna where he is directly enrolled in second year. In 1928, he obtained the first diploma of Zitounian high school leaving, then called tatwi. In 1931, he enrolled at the Faculty of Letters of Algiers as a free auditor. He then rapidly gravitated to the various ranks of the Zitounian teachers: he succeeded in 1932 in the assistance of second-level teachers and, in 1935, in first-degree teachers at the University of Ez-Zitouna.

A few years later, he became director of the Khaldounia, General manager of the Institute of Islamic Research, annexed to Khaldounia, then the first Dean of the Faculty of Religious Sciences of Tunis and finally member of the Academy of the Arabic Language in Cairo and of the Arab Academy of Damascus.

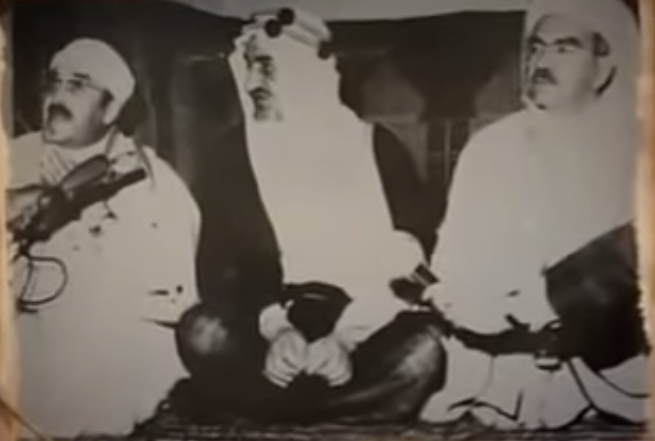
Mohamed Fadhel Ben Achour with king Faisal of Saudi Arabia (Tunis, 1975)

=== Defense of the Code of Personal Status ===
As the Grand Mufti of the Tunisian Republic, he was one of the religious who defended the provisions of the Code of Personal Status (CPS) in Tunisia, as they represent possible interpretations of Islam. He described the CPS as "a necessity of modern times [...] but always in accordance with the foundational texts of Islam."

== Family ==
Mohamed Fadhel Ben Achour married Sabiha Djaït, the daughter of Sheikh Mohamed Abdelaziz Djaït, in 1938. The couple had six children: two sons, Yadh and Rafâa, and four daughters: Hela (a philosophy professor), Raoudha, Rabaâ (an academic), and Sana (an academic and jurist).

== Honours ==
- 1966 : Commander of the Order of the Republic of Tunisia
- 1968 : Commander of the Order of Ouissam Alaouite of Morocco

== Publications ==
- (in Arabic) The literary and intellectual movement in Tunisia (الحركة الأدبية والفكرية بتونس), ed. The Arab League, Cairo, 1956
- (in Arabic) The authors of Islamic thought in the Arab Maghreb (أعلام الفكر الإسلامي بالمغرب العربي), ed. Librairie Ennajah, Tunis, 1965
- (in Arabic) The Quranic exegesis and its authors (التفسير ورجاله), ed. Maison orientale des livres, Tunis, 1966
- (in Arabic) The foundations of literary Renaissance in Tunisia (أركان النهضة الأدبية بتونس), ed. Librairie Ennajah, Tunis, 1968
- (in Arabic) Biographies of illustrious men (تراجم الأعلام), ed. Maison tunisienne de l'édition, Tunis, 1970
- (in Arabic) Afaal's Book (كتاب أفعل), ed. Ben Abdallah, Tunis, 1972
- (in Arabic) Maghrebian conferences (المحاضرات المغربيات), ed. Maison tunisienne de l'édition, Tunis, 1974
- (in Arabic) The spirit of Islamic civilization (روح الحضارة الإسلامية), ed. Higher Institute of Islamic Sciences, Beirut, 1982
- (in Arabic) Thinking flashes (ومضات فكر), deux tomes, ed. Maison arabe du livre, Tunis, 1982
- (in Arabic) Conferences (محاضرات), éd. Centre de publications universitaires, Tunis, 1998
