= Sihem Bensedrine =

Tunisian journalist and human rights activist (born 1950)

- سهام بن سدرين
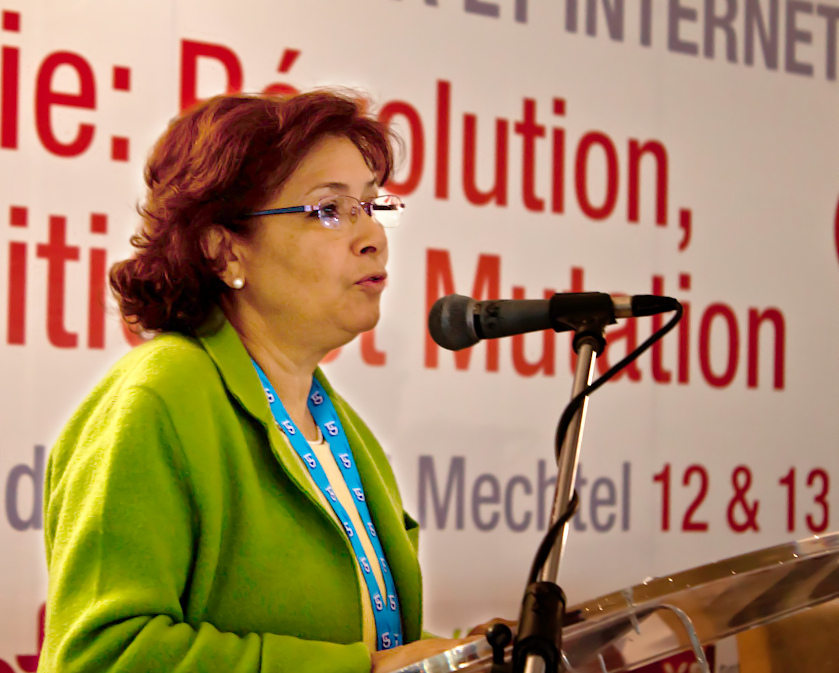
- Sihem Bensedrine at an event (4M Cairo Forum) in Tunis, Tunisia, January 2012
- Born: October 28, 1950 (age 76); La Marsa, Tunisia
- Occupation: journalist
- Awards: Oxfam Novib/PEN Award

Sihem Bensedrine (Arabic: سهام بن سدرين; born 28 October 1950) is a Tunisian journalist and human rights activist. In 2005, she was honored with the Oxfam Novib/PEN Award.

== Education and literary work ==
Bensedrine was born in La Marsa next to Tunis and studied at the University of Toulouse in Toulouse, France southeast of Bordeaux. She earned a degree in philosophy. In 1980, she became a reporter for the independent journal Le Phare. When the journal stopped publication, she became a political chief at Maghreb, and then at Réalités. When Maghreb ceased publication because of the food riots in 1983, she became the editor-in-chief of Gazette Touristique and founded l'Hebdo Touristique. At the same time, she was overseeing the opposition newspaper El Mawkif.

She founded the publishing house Arcs in 1988 but it went bankrupt in 1992 because of the human rights crisis. In 1998, she became the literary chief for the publishing house Noir sur Blanc. In 1998, she founded the Conseil National pour les Libertés en Tunisie (CNLT), of which she became the primary spokesperson. From 1999, Bensedrine and her businesses were subject to numerous police and judicial actions including confiscation and destruction of property and a personal libel campaign in which she was portrayed as a prostitute, because of her freedom of the press and human rights activities.

In 2000, she co-founded the online journal Kalima with Naziha Réjiba. In 2001, Réjiba and Bensedrine founded the group Observatoire de la Liberté de la Presse, de L'Edition et de la Création (OLPEC), which promotes freedom of the press. On 17 June 2001, Bensedrine appeared on the "Le Grand Maghreb", Al Mustaquilla television station, based in London. She was openly critical of corruption in Tunisia and its government. On 26 June 2001, she was arrested at the airport in Tunis Carthage after a television interview in which she denounced human rights abuses, including systematic use of torture and widespread judicial corruption. She was accused of spreading "false news with an aim towards disturbing public order", "defamation" and "undermining the judicial institution". There was confusion as to whether she had been arrested or not as standard Tunisian legal procedures had not been followed. It was later confirmed by members of Lawyers Without Borders that she had been arrested and proper legal procedures were maintained.

On 10 July 2001, Bensedrine was awarded the "Special Award for Human Rights Journalism Under Threat" at the Amnesty International UK Media Awards. Her husband and daughter received the award on her behalf. On 12 August Bensedrine was released because of widespread support, both in Tunisia and abroad, particularly in France. Her arrest was positively linked to her appearance on the Al Mustaquilla television station and her appearance on 17 June 2001 was cited by the Tunisian government as evidence in a defamation case which they pursued against the Al Mustaquilla television station.

In 2004, Bensedrine was honored by Canadian Journalists for Free Expression with an International Press Freedom Award in recognition of her courage in defending and promoting press freedom. In 2005, she was honored with the Oxfam Novib/PEN Award. In 2008, she received The Danish Peace Fund Prize as an acknowledgment of her unyielding commitment to the cause of democracy and rule of a law in her home country and for her efforts to organize networks among human rights activist in the Arab world.

In 2011 she was awarded the Alison Des Forges Award by Human Rights Watch in recognition of her twenty years working to expose human rights violations under former Tunisian President Ben Ali. The award "celebrates the valor of individuals who put their lives on the line to protect the dignity and rights of others." She also won the IPI Free Media Pioneer Award. Radio Kalima was among the 12 radio stations which received the recommendation of the National Authority for the Information and Communication Reform (NAICR) to be given a license, but were still awaiting the blessing of the interim government in 2012. Since 2014, Besedrine has headed the Truth and Dignity Commission in Tunisia, a constitutional commission tasked with hearing testimony from victims of state-sanctioned torture and corruption between 1955 and 2011. The commission held its first public hearing session on November 18.

In February 2023, a ban on leaving Tunisian territory was issued against Bensedrine. On 1 August 2024, she was arrested and imprisoned, She was arrested for “conspiracy against state security”. On 14 January 2025, she started a hunger strike in protest of her imprisonment in Manouba prison. On 19 February 2025, the Tunisian justice system ordered the immediate release of Bensedrine. On 26 June 2026, Bensedrine was sentenced to a total of 25 years in prison as well as a fine by a court in Tunis, in relation to her August 2024 arrest. In November 2026, she was sentenced to an additional five years in prison.

== Awards ==
- The Ibn Rushd Prize for Freedom of Thought for the year 2011 in Berlin.

In the late 1970s Bensedrine and other members of the Tunisian Human Rights League collectively won the Nobel Peace Prize in 2015.

== See also ==
- Tunisia Monitoring Group
