= Ibn Ashur =

Tunisian Islamic scholar (1879–1973)

- ابن عاشور
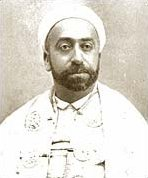
- Title: Shaykh ul-Islam

Personal life
- Born: 1879 Tunis, Beylik of Tunis
- Died: 1973 (aged 93–94) La Marsa, Tunisia
- Notable work(s): Tafsir al-Tahrir wa al-Tanwir, Maqasid al-Shari'ah al-Islamiyyah, A laysa al-subh bi-qarib

Religious life
- Religion: Islam
- Denomination: Sunni
- Jurisprudence: Maliki
- Creed: Ash'ari
- Movement: Modernism

Muslim leader
- Influenced by: Muhammad Abduh
- Influenced: Sohaib Saeed
- Children: Mohamed Fadhel Ben Achour; Abdelmalek Ben Achour

Ibn Ashur (Note: Arabic: محمد الطاهر ابن محمد ابن محمد الطاهر ابن عاشور, romanized: Muḥammad al-Ṭāhir ibn Muḥammad ibn Muḥammad al-Ṭāhir ibn ʿĀshūr) (1879 – August 1973) was a Tunisian Islamic scholar. A graduate of University of Ez-Zitouna, he studied classical Islamic scholarship with reform-minded scholars. He became a judge then conferred the title Shaykh al-Islām in 1932.

He was a writer and author on the subject of reforming Islamic education and jurisprudence. He is best remembered for his Qur'anic exegesis, al-Tahrir wa'l-Tanwir (The Verification and Enlightenment).

== Early life ==
Muhammad al-Tahir ibn Ashur was born in Tunis in 1879 to an affluent family and died in 1973 at age 94. He was of Andalusian origin. The family had shown dedication to the pursuit of knowledge for generations. His grandfather was especially renowned. When he entered Zaytuna, care was made to provide him with the best teachers. He was a teacher at Zaytuna all his life. His masterpiece is the Maqasid al-Shari'ah al-Islamiyyah, the Intents, or Higher Goals of Islamic Law, published in 1946. He is famous for rejecting Habib Bourguiba's (president of Tunisia) request for a fatwa to justify abandoning the fast of the month of Ramadan claiming it harmed productivity. He responded by stating "Prescribed for you is fasting", and announced on the radio, "God has spoken the truth and Bourguiba has spoken falsehood." He was, as a result, dismissed from his post.

Influenced by a visit to Tunisia by Muhammad Abduh, Ibn Ashur combined knowledge of the classics with a desire to revive Islamic civilization. He positioned himself as a bridge between the classical Islamic legal heritage and the needs of a modern world. His references to the great works of law are respectful and at times praiseworthy, but he does not hesitate to point out shortcomings. Responding to modern challenges to Islamic traditions, Ibn Ashur called for substantive reforms in Islamic education. His work on the ultimate purposes of Shari'a represented an attempt to revive the maqasid theory of Shatibi and an effort to renew Islamic legal theory.

== Personal views ==
Ibn Ashur intended his work to be relevant to the modern world. He claimed that the discipline of usul al-fiqh (Islamic jurisprudence) had reached its limits and become over-burdened with methodological technicalities. Appropriate legal responses to situations in the modern world cannot be found by delving deeper and deeper into the meaning of a word.

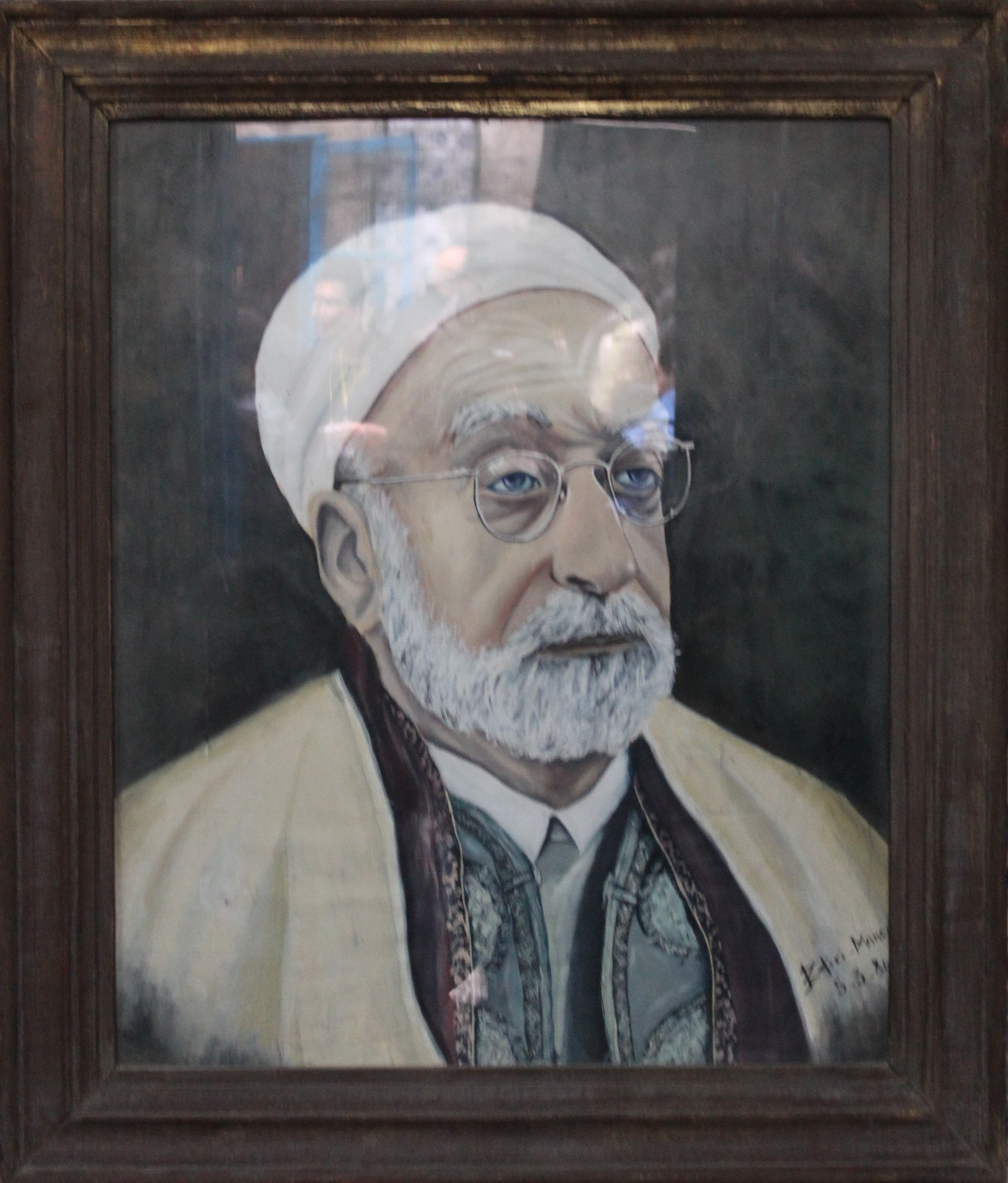
Portrait of Mohamed Tahar Ben Achour at the Tunisian Academy of Sciences, Letters, and Arts (Carthage).

== Scholarly work ==
Ibn Ashur asserted the view that language is fundamentally ambiguous and is not enough to determine the intent of a speaker. Further, while written words are less subject to distortion, the spoken word is actually more likely to convey the speaker's intent. The entire field surrounding the word must be considered. In contrast, the return of generations to Medina to assess the meaning of a statement shows the importance of understanding context.

Ibn Ashur questioned the juridical weight of an isolated hadith in determining legislation. Instead, legislative value should be sought from the totality of shari'ah. He suggested that comments seemingly to the contrary from Imam al-Shafi'i and Imam Ahmad ibn Hanbal must be distortions of their work. He worried that taking a solitary (ahad) hadith in isolation from the body of shari'ah would end the quest for understanding in context. Preferring a solitary hadith over a rational deduction based on context would be problematic. Ibn Ashur believes that al-Shafi'i was misunderstood as accepting a solitary hadith over the larger context and that Ahmad ibn Hanbal was misrepresented as accepting a weak hadith over qiyas. Ibn Ashur says that a weak hadith is open to error, and qiyas is open to error, but in addition, the weak hadith may be a lie and the consequence of using it would be worse than using qiyas.

Ibn Ashur claimed that the basis of shari'ah must be rational. He said, "One of the greatest things required by the universality of the shari'ah is that its rules be equal for all the communities following it to the utmost extent possible because similarity in the flow of rules and laws is a help for achieving group unity in the community."

Because the shari'ah is universal, it must not be restricted to a single culture. The shari'ah came down in the Arabic language to the Arabic people, and therefore its coloring and style are Arabic. However, its intent is universal and so must be intelligible everywhere. This tells us that the law is based on reason. For example, the mandate of keeping raisin juice in certain kinds of containers comes from the fact that in the heat of the Hijaz the juice would quickly ferment. In cold climates, that would not apply. In fact, to stubbornly hold onto superficialities without understanding the intent is to "expose the shari'ah to being dismissed disdainfully."

Ibn Ashur saw this literal-mindedness to be represented by the Zahiri position. His strongest argument against it is that the literal occasions that the Zahiri hold onto are quite limited, but that people around the world encounter many more. Therefore, the maqasid of the shari'ah must be engaged.

Ibn Ashur called for ijtihad in the strongest terms. He said, "Ijtihad is a collective duty (fard al-kifayah) on the community according to the measure of need in the community's countries and situations." He chastised the Muslims for neglecting ijtihad despite the fact that the capacity and means are available. He wanted to see Muslims coming forth to practice ijtihad for the global community. It was clear to him that the lack of ijtihad had severe consequences. He called for a group of mujtahids from countries around the world, from different madhahib (schools), to address the needs of the community, as the basis for a renewal of civilisation.

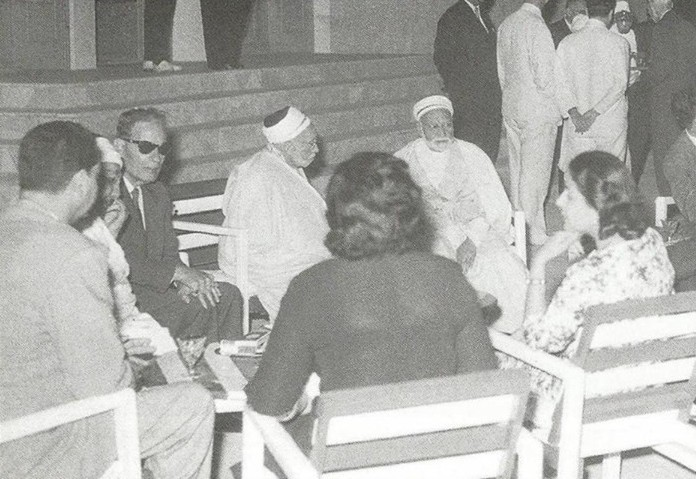
Mohamed Tahar Ben Achour with Taha Hussein, Mohamed Fadhel Ben Achour and Mohamed Abdelaziz Djaït (Tunis, 1957).

== Ibn 'Ashur on Qur'an 2:256 ==
One of the most fascinating approaches to the issue of coherence between Qur'an 2:256 (no coercion in religion), 3:83 (willingly or unwillingly), 9:29 (pay the Jizyah), 9:73 (strive against the disbelievers and the hypocrites) and 2:193 (and fight them until there is no fitnah), is that of Ibn 'Ashur. He understands verses 9:73 and 2:193, and the Hadith (I have been commanded (by Allah) to fight people until they testify that there is no true god except Allah), as connected to the fighting with the aggressive Arab pagans and after the conquest of Mecca (Fath Makkah) verse 2:256 came into force. this is opposed to the opinion that 2:256 is seen as abrogated (Mansukh) by 9:5/73, 66:9 or specific (Khass) for the People of the Book. However, in Ibn 'Ashur's interpretation, 9:73/66:9, 2:193 and the mentioned Hadith is specific for the historical struggle with the Arab pagans and after the conquest of Mecca verse 2:256 became absolute and decisive in meaning (Mutlaq wa Muhkam) and thus cannot be abrogated. Verse 9:29 took away any option of fighting unbelievers. He thus turns the classical reading around, while still connecting the Prophetic history with the Qur'anic text in a more logical way. He historicizes Qur'anic verses the same way classical scholars have done through the concept of abrogation (Naskh) and occasions of revelation (Asbab al-Nuzul), but takes the Maqasid al-Shari'ah (welfare objectives of the Islamic law) into account where a restriction on freedom of religion would violate the preservation of religion and intellect (Hifz al-Din wa al-'Aql).

== Honours ==
- Grand officier of Nichan Iftikhar (Tunisia)
- Grand officer of the Order of Civil Merit of Tunisia

== Acknowledgment ==
- Member of the Arab Academy of Damascus
- Member of the Academy of the Arabic Language in Cairo

== Works ==
Ibn 'Ashur wrote more than thirty books, amongst them:

- (ar) The Objectives of Islamic Law (مقاصد الشريعة الإسلامية)
- (ar) Definitions of the [Islamic] Sciences (تعريفات العلوم)
- (ar) The Rudiments of the Social Sciences within Islam (أصول النظام الاجتماعي في الإسلام)
- (ar) Is the Dawn not Close ? (أليس الصبح بقريب)
- (ar) The Nonprofit (Waqf) and Its Traces upon Islam (الوقف و آثاره في الإسلام)
- (ar) The Story of the Birth [of the Prophet] (قصة المولد)
- (ar) Inquests into and Theories of the Qur'an and Sunnah (تحقيقات و أنظار في القرآن و السنة)
- (ar) The Principles of Islamic Jurisprudence (التوضيح و التصحيح لمشكلات كتاب التنقيح)
- (ar) Contemporary Issues in Islamic Jurisprudence (النوازل الشرعية)
- (ar) Legal Opinions (آراء اجتهادية)
- (ar) The Rudiments of Antecedence in Islam (أصول التقدم في الاسلام)
- (ar) Responsa (الفتاوى)
- (ar) The Verification and Illumination (تفسير التحرير و التنوير) : a 30 volume exegesis of the Qur'an.

== Sources ==
- Ibn Ashur: Treatise on Maqasid Al-Shariah, translated from the Arabic and annotated by Mohamed El-Tahir El-Mesawi
- Muhammad al-Tahir ibn Ashur on IAIS
- M. Nafi, Basheer (2005). "Tāhir ibn ʿĀshūr: The Career and Thought of a Modern Reformist ʿālim, with Special Reference to His Work of tafsīr". Journal of Qur'anic Studies. 7 (1): 1–32. doi:10.3366/jqs.2005.7.1.1. ISSN 1465-3591.
