= University of Ez-Zitouna =

University in Tunisia

Ez-Zitouna University
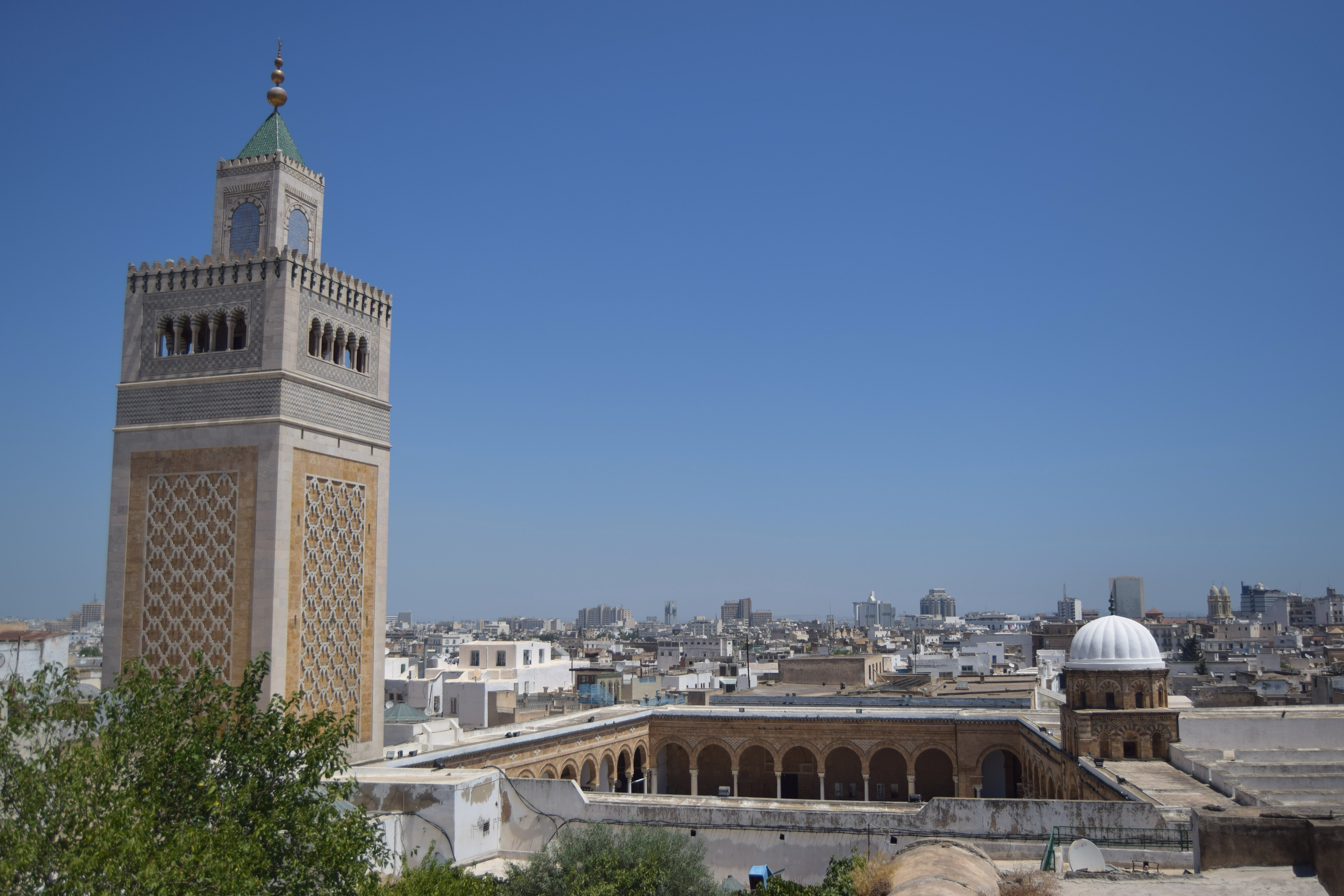
- Al-Zaytuna Mosque, historically the seat of the university
- Type: Public university
- Vice-Chancellor: Abdellatif Bouazizi (President)
- Faculty: 150
- Undergraduates: 1500
- Postgraduates: 500
- Location: Tunis, Tunisia; 36.794466°N 10.164118°E
- Website: www.uz.rnu.tn

Ez-Zitouna University (Arabic: جامعة الزيتونة, romanized: Jāmi‘a al-Zaytūna, French: Université Ez-Zitouna) is a medieval public university in Tunis, Tunisia. The university originated in the Al-Zaytuna Mosque, founded at the end of the 7th or in the early 8th century, which developed into a major Islamic centre of learning in North Africa. It consists of the Oldest and Higher Institute of Theology and the Higher Institute of Islamic Civilisation in Tunis and a research institution, the Centre of Islamic Studies, in Kairouan.

== History ==
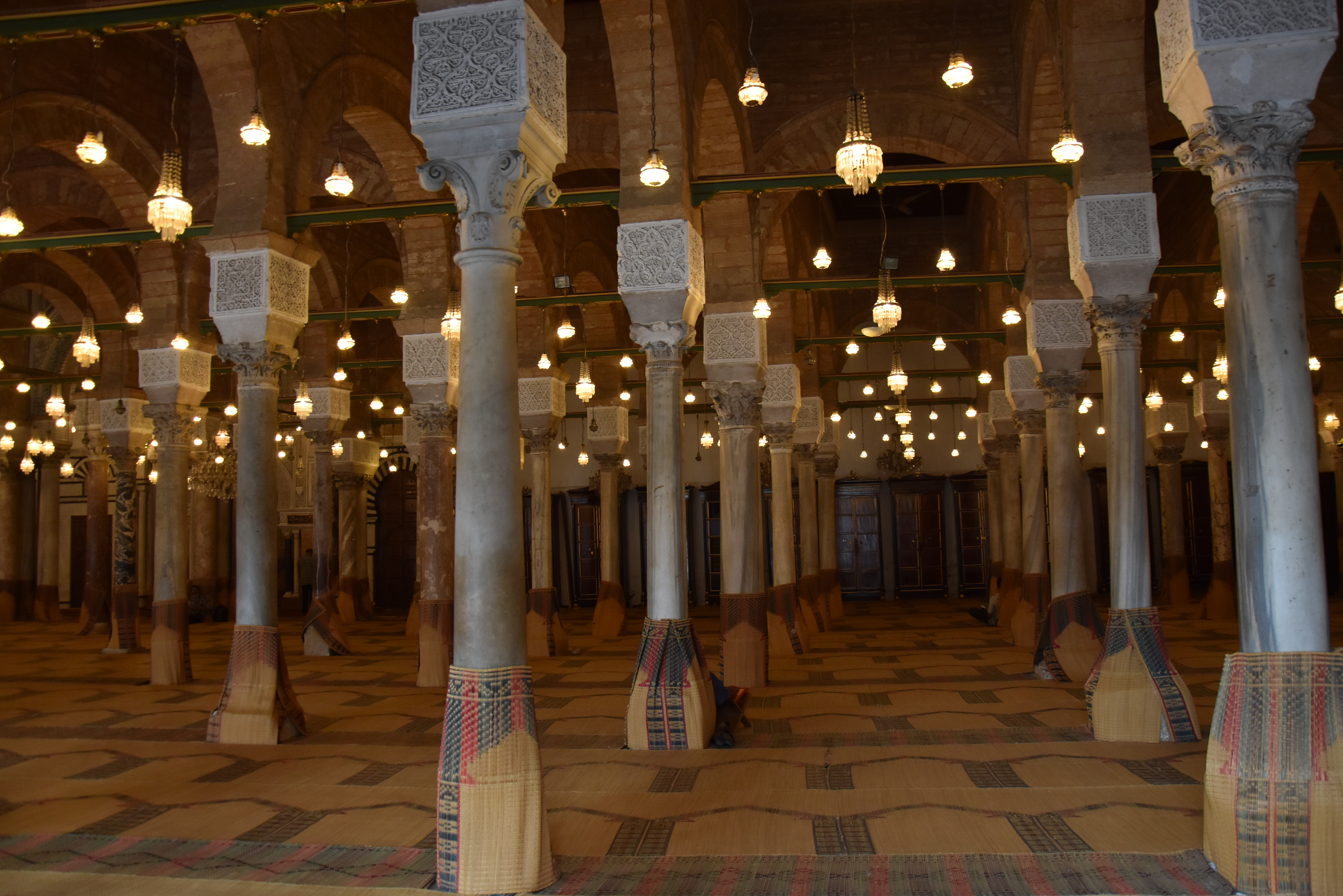
Interior of Al-Zaytuna Mosque in the historic medina of Tunis

There is little information about teaching at the Zaytuna Mosque prior to the 14th century. At that time there were most probably courses being offered voluntarily by ulama (Islamic legal scholars), but not in an organized manner. For centuries, Kairouan was the early centre of learning and intellectual pursuits in Tunisia and North Africa in general. Starting from the 13th century, Tunis became the capital of Ifriqiya under Almohad and Hafsid rule. This shift in power helped al-Zaytuna to flourish and become one of the major centres of Islamic learning. Ibn Khaldun, the first social historian in history, was one of its products. The flourishing university attracted students and men of learning from all parts of the known world at the time. Along with disciplines of theology – such as exegesis of the Qur'an (tafsir) – the university taught fiqh (Islamic jurisprudence), Arabic grammar, history, science and medicine. It also had a kuttab, or elementary school, that taught children how to read, write, and memorize religious texts. The system of teaching was not rigid: attendance was not mandatory and students could follow the courses of their choice. Students who followed a course and became knowledgeable enough to teach the subject on their own were granted a certificate called an ijazah by their instructor.

Rich libraries were also attached to the university. The manuscripts covered almost all subjects and sciences, including grammar, logic, documentations, etiquette of research, cosmology, arithmetic, geometry, minerals, vocational training, etc. One of its famous libraries, al-Abdaliyah, included a large collection of rare manuscripts that attracted scholars from abroad. Much of the library's original collection was dispersed or destroyed when the Spanish occupied Tunis and broke into the Zaytuna Mosque in 1534.

The start of Ottoman rule in 1574 initially brought a decline in teaching, but it quickly recovered. The institution received greater attention and political patronage in the 18th century, attracting financial support from the ruling Husainid beys. By that time, however, the teaching of non-religious subjects had significantly declined. Administrative and curricular reforms to the institution were begun by Ahmad Bey in 1842. They continued in 1875 under Prime Minister Khayr al-Din al-Tunisi, who also expanded the al-Abdaliyah Library and opened it to the public. In 1896 new courses were introduced such as physics, political economy, and French, and in 1912 these reforms were extended to the university's other branches in Kairouan, Sousse, Tozeur, and Gafsa. Until the 20th century the students were mostly recruited from Tunisia's wealthy families but afterwards its recruitment broadened. Under French colonial rule it became a bastion of Arab and Islamic culture resisting French influence. Some prominent members of the Algerian nationalist movement studied here, such as 'Abd al-Hamid ibn Badis, Tawfiq Madani, and Houari Boumédiène. The traditional pedagogy of the university opposed French influence in Tunisian culture, even though younger people who studied there and who were unable to attend other universities lost the concept of the university having prestige. The students, faculty, and alumni became an integral part of the 1920s Destour party.

Following Tunisia's Independence, the modern University of Zitouna was established on April 26, 1956. Reforms to the education system in 1958 and the creation of the University of Tunis in 1960 reduced the importance of Zitouna. The university's library was also integrated into the National Libraries of Tunis. The University of Zitouna was succeeded by the Zitouna Faculty of Shari’a and Theology on March 1, 1961 which became one of the components of University of Tunis. In 1964–1965 its status as an independent university was abolished by President Habib Bourguiba and it was relegated to being a theological college for the University of Tunis. For years afterward, under the rule of both Bourguiba and his successor Ben Ali, the educational institution was kept officially and physically distinct from the mosque itself. The Zitouna name was restored by Zine El Abidine Ben Ali in 1987, after having been changed under Bourguiba.

In 2012, after the Tunisian revolution and in response to a court petition by a group of Tunisian citizens, the mosque's former educational offices were reopened and it was declared as an independent educational institution once again.

== Faculties ==
1. Higher Institute of the Foundations of Religion (المعهد العالي لأصول الدين)
2. Higher Institute of Islamic Civilization (المعهد العالي للحضارة الإسلامية)
3. Higher Institute of Islamic Sciences in Kairouan (المعهد العالي للعلوم الإسلامية بالقيروان)

== Notable alumni ==
The university's alumni include:

- Ibn Khaldun, a 14th-century scholar
- Tahar Haddad, trade unionist and writer
- Abdelaziz Thâalbi, politician and writer
- Aboul-Qacem Echebbi, Tunisian national poet
- Ibn Ashur. Islamic Scholar of 20th century.
- Chaima Issa, journalist, poet, writer, human rights activist and prominent member of National Salvation Front

== See also ==
- List of Islamic educational institutions
- Great Mosque of Kairouan
