= Bardo National Museum (Tunis) =

National museum in Tunisia

- Arabic: المتحف الوطني بباردو; French: Musée national du Bardo
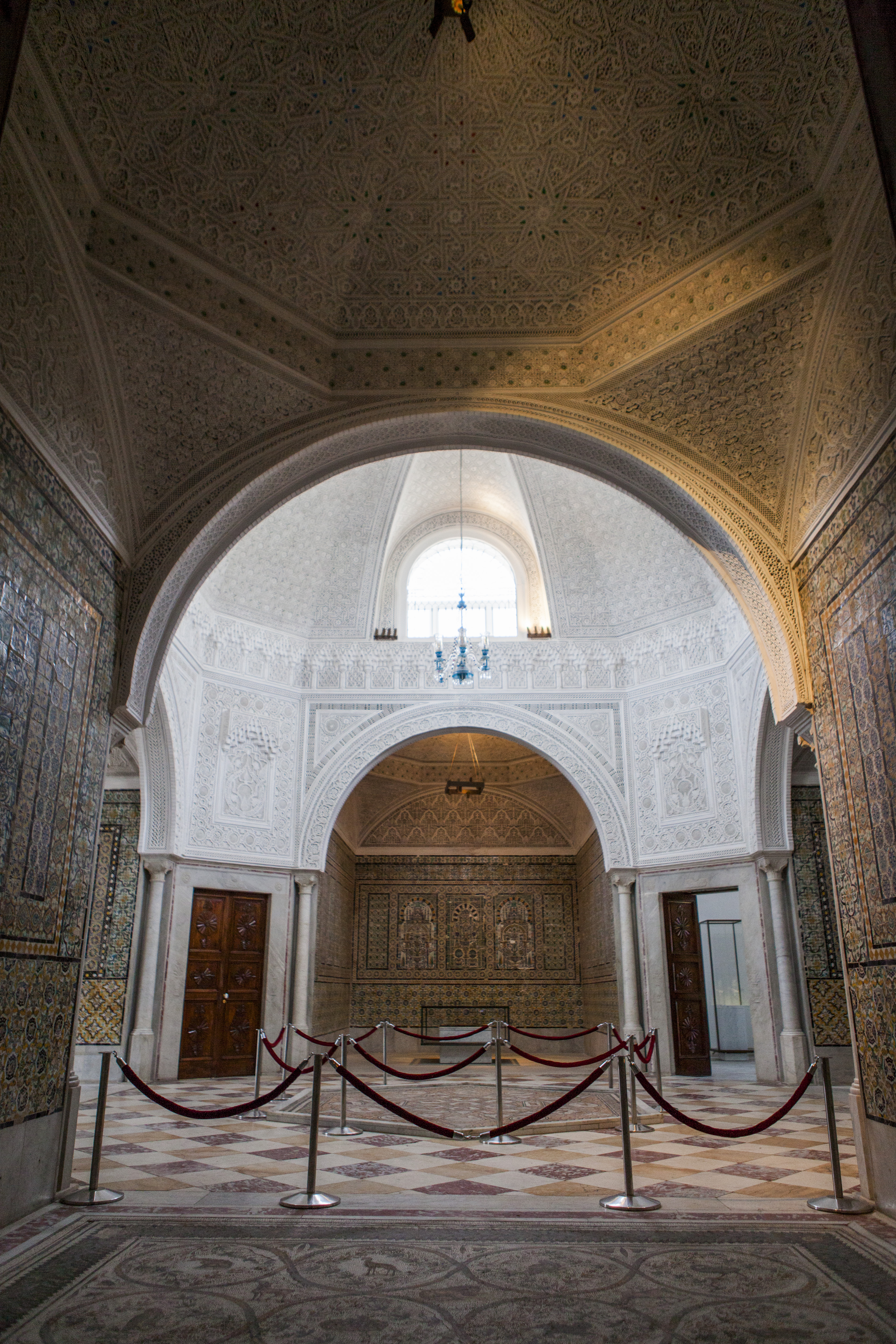
- Museum Bardo, in Tunis, Tunisia
- Established: 7 May 1888; 138 years ago
- Location: Le Bardo, Tunis, Tunisia
- Coordinates: 36°48′34″N 10°8′4″E
- Type: National museum Palace
- Collection size: over 150,000 Objects Prehistory and Protohistory; Libyco-Punic; Ancient Egyptian; Hellenistic; Numidian; Roman; Early Christianity; Vandals; Byzantine; Islamic; Ottoman; Kingdom of Tunisia
- Visitors: 664,891
- Founder: Ali III ibn al-Husayn
- Curator: Moncef Ben Moussa
- Website: www.bardomuseum.tn

The Bardo National Museum (Arabic: المتحف الوطني بباردو, romanized: el-Metḥef el-Waṭanī bi-Bārdū; French: Musée national du Bardo) or Bardo Palace is an arts and North African history museum in Le Bardo, Tunis, Tunisia. It is one of the most important museums in the Mediterranean region and the second largest museum in Africa after the Egyptian Museum of Cairo. It traces the history of Tunisia over several millennia and across several civilizations through a wide variety of archaeological pieces.

First proposed in the 1860s by Muhammad Khaznadar, the son of the Prime Minister of Tunisia, the museum has been housed in an old beylical palace since 1888. Originally called the Alaoui Museum (Arabic: المتحف العلوي, romanized: al-Matḥaf al-ʿAlawī), named after the reigning bey at the time, it was renamed as the Bardo Museum after the independence of the country.

The museum houses one of the largest collections of Roman mosaics in the world, thanks to excavations in various archaeological sites in the country including Carthage, Hadrumetum, Dougga and Utica. The mosaics, such as the Virgil Mosaic, represent a major source for research on everyday life in Roman Africa. From the Roman era, the museum also contains a rich collection of marble statues representing the deities and Roman emperors found on different sites including those of Carthage and Thuburbo Majus.

The museum also houses pieces discovered during the excavations of Libyco-Punic sites including Carthage, although the National Museum of Carthage is the primary museum of the Carthage archaeological site. The essential pieces of this department are grimacing masks, terracotta statues and stelae of major interest for Semitic epigraphy, and the stele of the priest and the child. The museum also houses Greek works discovered especially in the excavations of the shipwreck of Mahdia, whose emblematic piece remains the bust of Aphrodite in marble, gnawed by the sea.

On 18 March 2015, an Islamist terrorist group attacked the museum and took tourists hostage in the building. Responsibility for the attack, which killed 22 people including 21 foreign tourists, was claimed by the Islamic State of Iraq and the Levant.

== Location and description ==
Bardo museum plan.

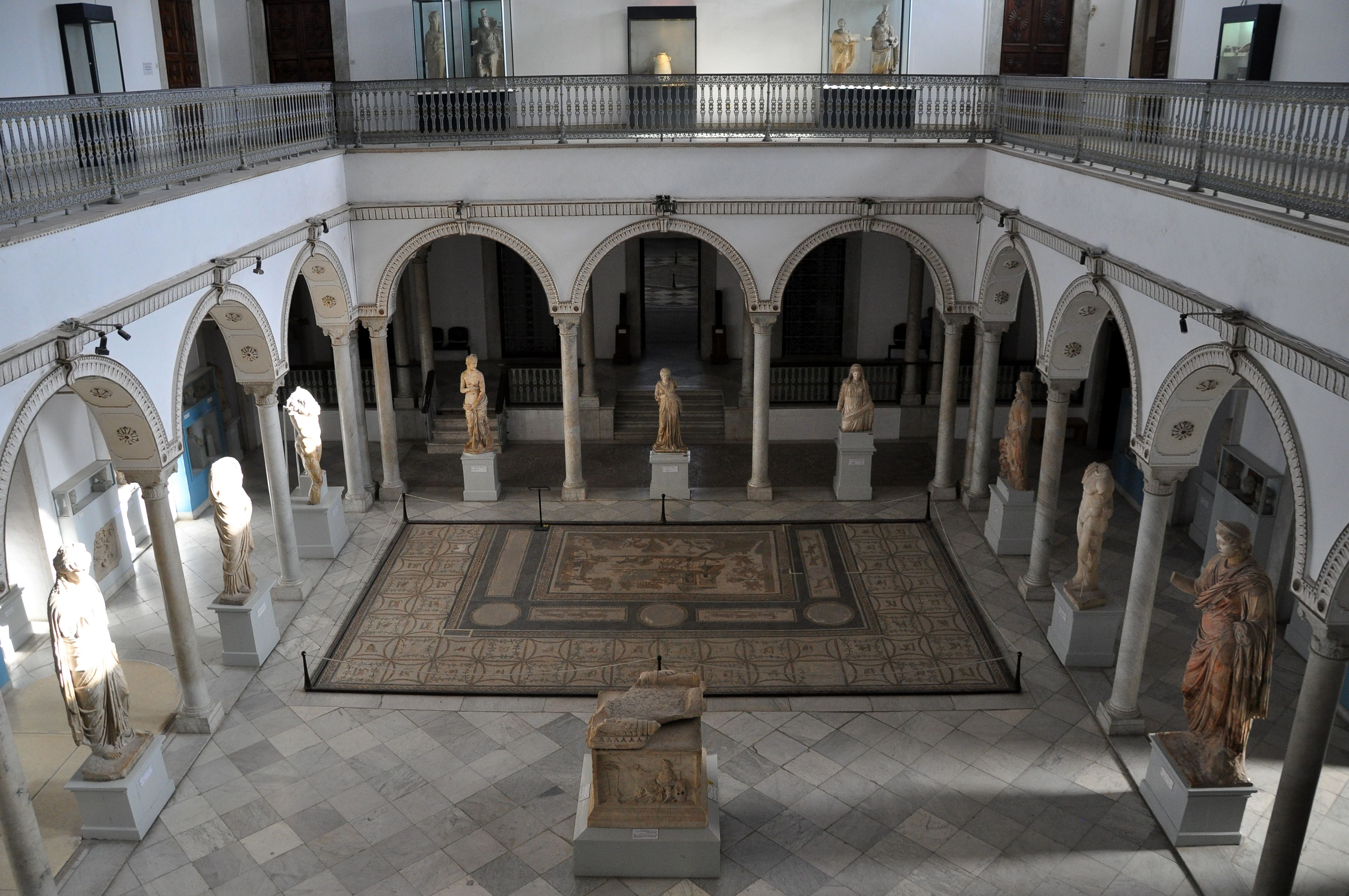
Carthage Room.

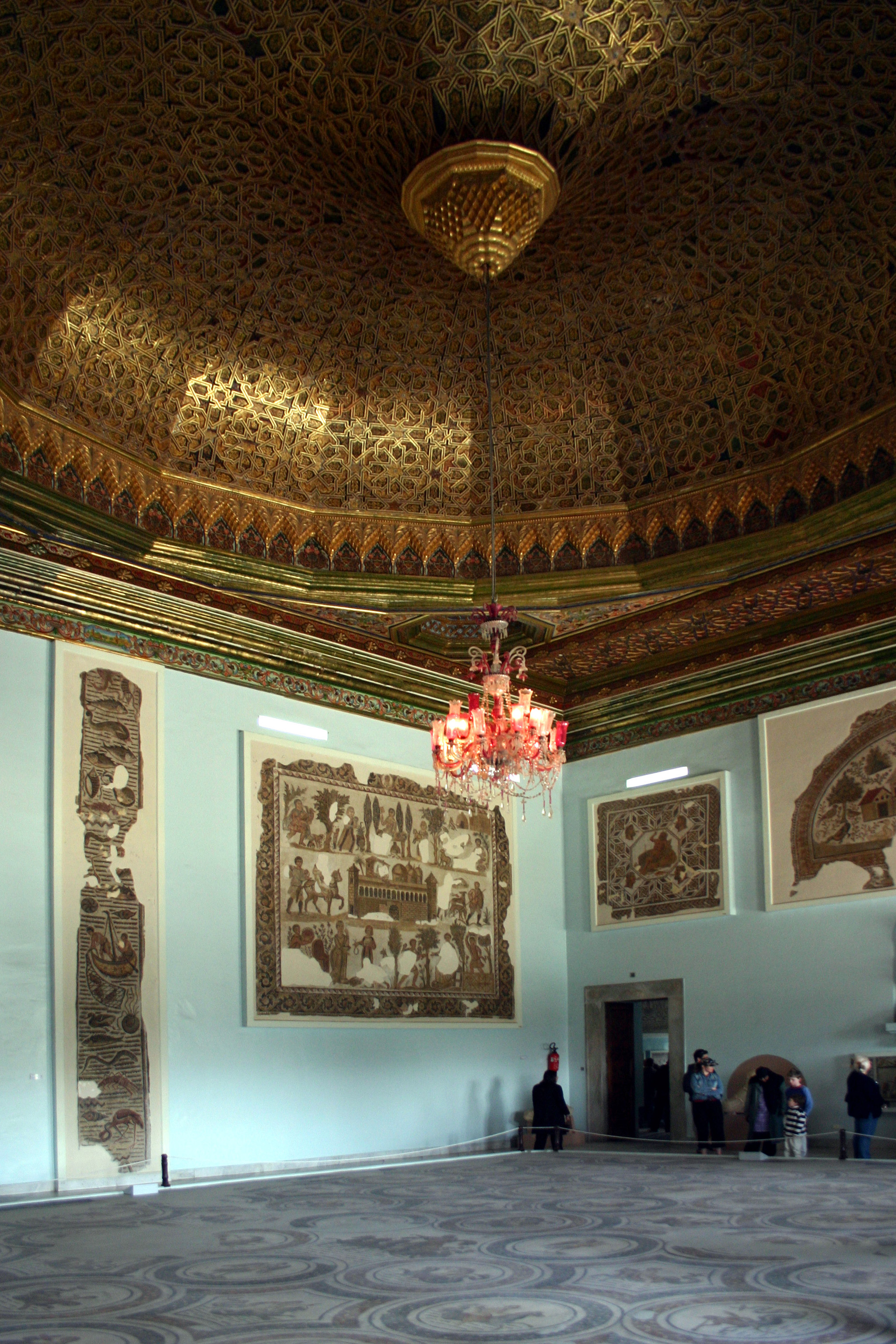
Sousse Room.

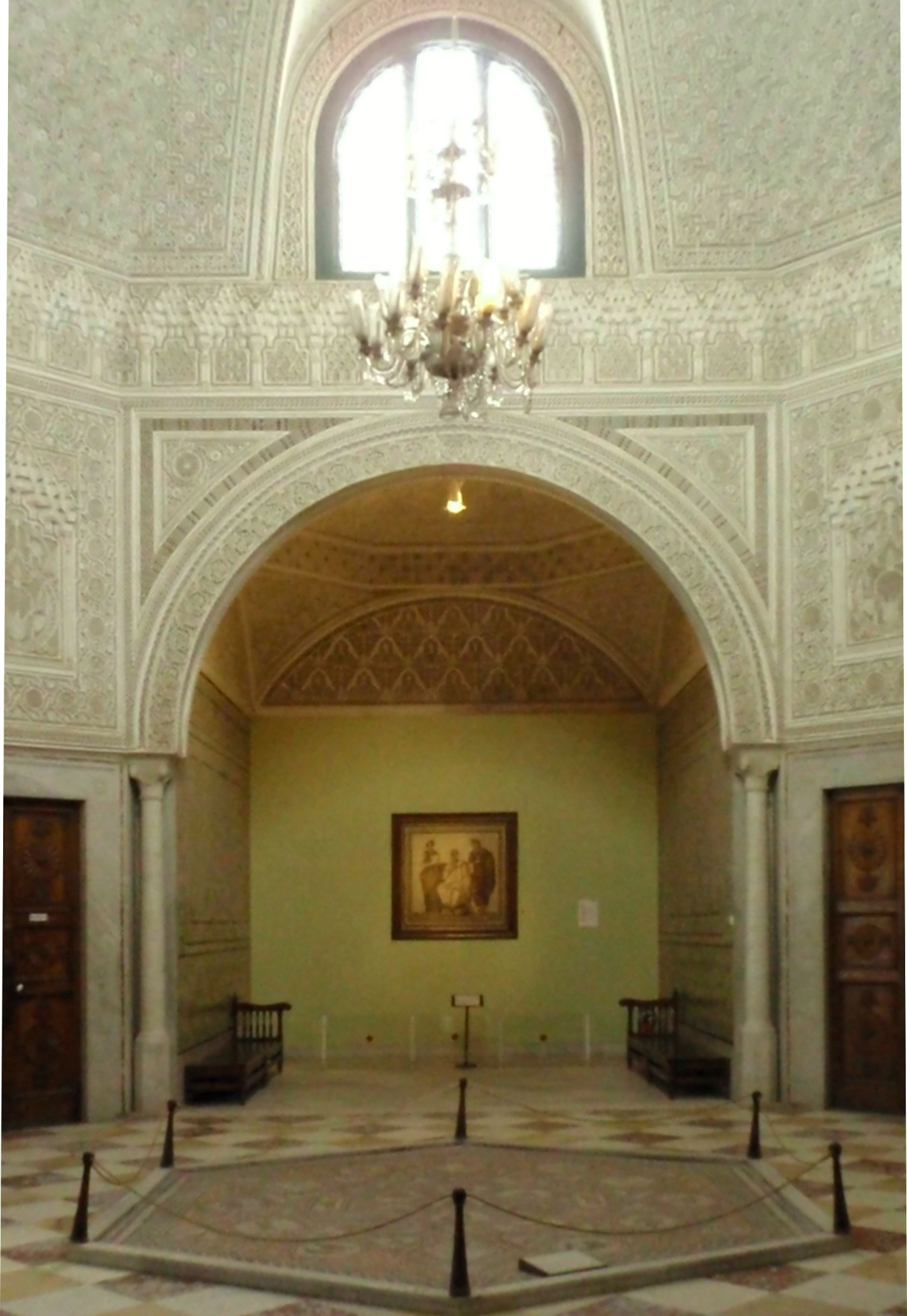
Virgile Room.

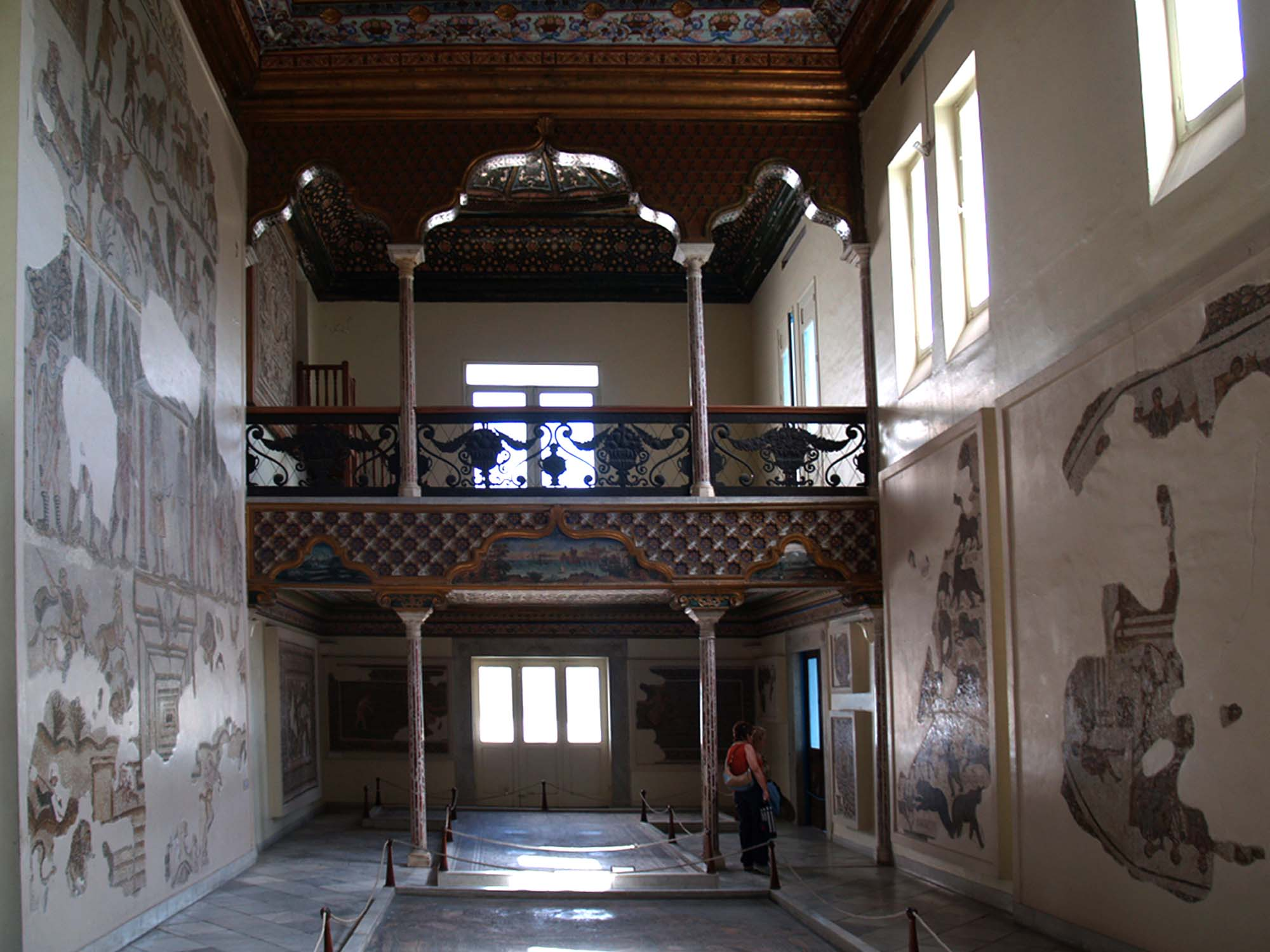
d’Althiburos Room.

The Bardo National Museum building was originally a 15th-century Hafsid palace, located in the suburbs of Tunis.

The Bardo is one of the most important museums of the Mediterranean basin, and the second largest on the African continent after the Egyptian Museum. It traces the history of Tunisia over several millennia and through many civilizations through a wide variety of archaeological pieces. Being in the former palace, it offers many major works discovered since the beginnings of archaeological research in the country. Originally called Museum Alaoui (المتحف العلوي), the name of the reigning bey at the time, it has had its current name of Museum of Bardo only since the country's independence.

In addition to famous works such as the Blue Koran of Kairouan, the Islamic Department contains a collection of ceramics from North Africa and Asia Minor.

The Bardo brings together one of the finest and largest collections of Roman mosaics in the world thanks to the excavations undertaken from the beginning of the 20th century on archaeological sites in the country including Carthage, Hadrumetum, Dougga, or Utica. The mosaics represent a unique source for research on everyday life in Roman Africa. The museum also contains a rich collection of marble statues representing the gods and Roman emperors found on various sites including those of Carthage and Thuburbo Majus.

The Bardo has also rich pieces discovered during the excavations of Libyco-Punic sites including mainly Carthage, although the Carthage National Museum also possesses an important collection. The main parts of this department are grimacing masks, terracotta statues and stelae of major interest for the Semitic epigraphy, the stele of the priest and the child being the most famous. The museum also houses Greek works discovered in particular in the excavations of the ship of Mahdia, whose iconic piece is a marble bust of Aphrodite.

The museum underwent a major refurbishment, completed in 2012, that was interrupted due to the Tunisian revolution. The expansion, which added 9,000 square meters to the complex, was designed by SCPA Codou-Hindley (France) and Amira Nouira (Tunisia). Considerable funding came from the World Bank.

== Collections ==
Small Patio of the Palace.

It contains a major collection of Roman mosaics and other antiquities of interest from Ancient Greece, Carthage, and the Islamic period.

The museum displays objects ranging from pre-historical artifacts to modern jewelry.

== 2015 terrorist attack ==
On 18 March 2015, 24 people were killed in a terrorist attack when three terrorists in civil uniform attacked the museum and took hostages. Twenty-one people, mostly European tourists, were killed at the scene, while an additional victim died ten days later. Around fifty others were injured. Two of the gunmen, Tunisian citizens Yassine Labidi and Saber Khachnaoui, were killed by police, while the third attacker escaped. It was the deadliest terrorist attack in Tunisian history; surpassing the 2002 Ghriba synagogue bombing, which killed nineteen people and injured more than thirty others, most of whom were also European tourists.

== Gallery ==
=== "Carthaginian art" ===
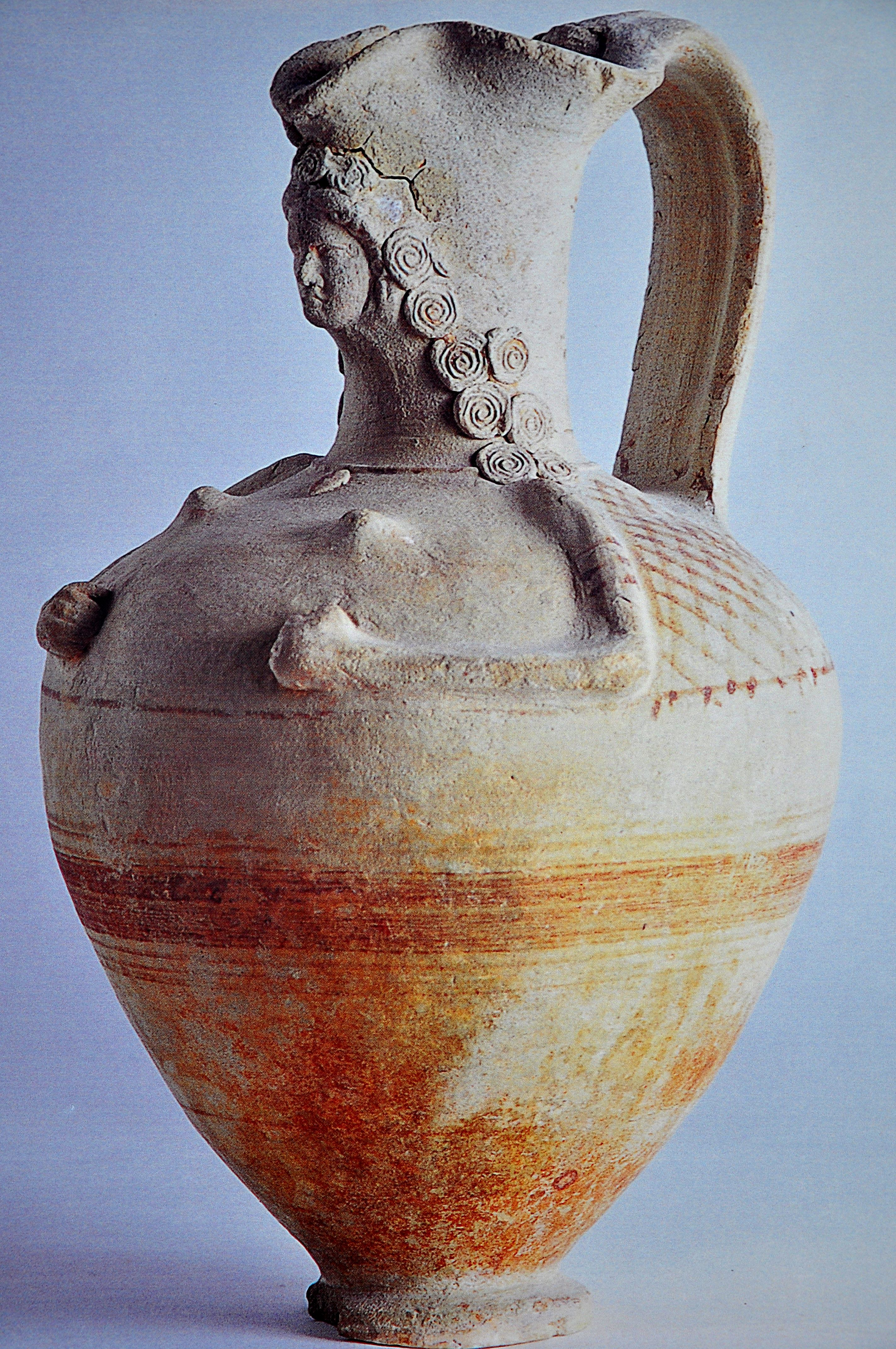
Anthropomorphic amphora

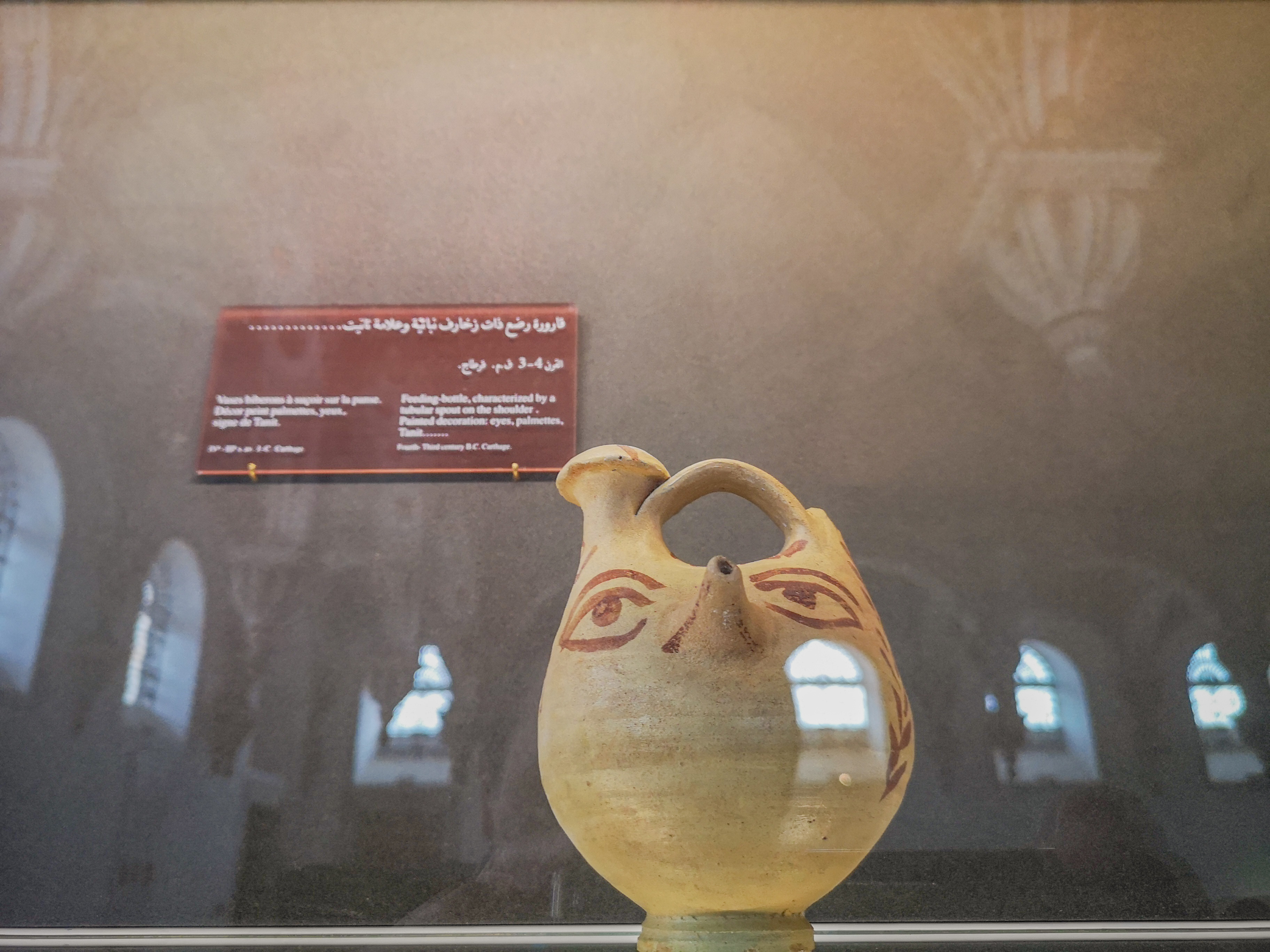
Carthaginian baby bottle. Painted decoration: eyes; palmettes; Tanit 3rd century BCE

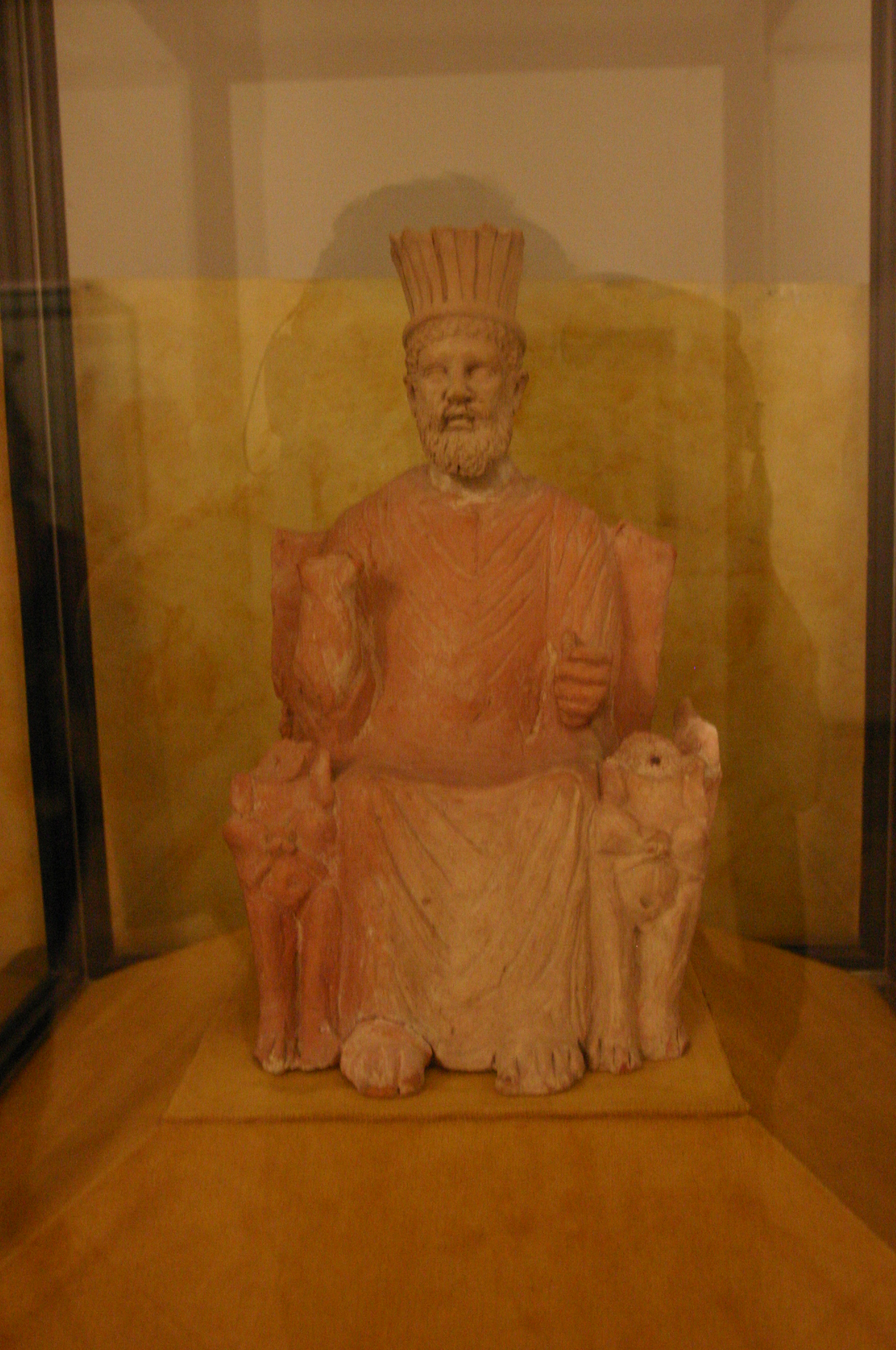
Statue of Baal Hammon sitting on a throne

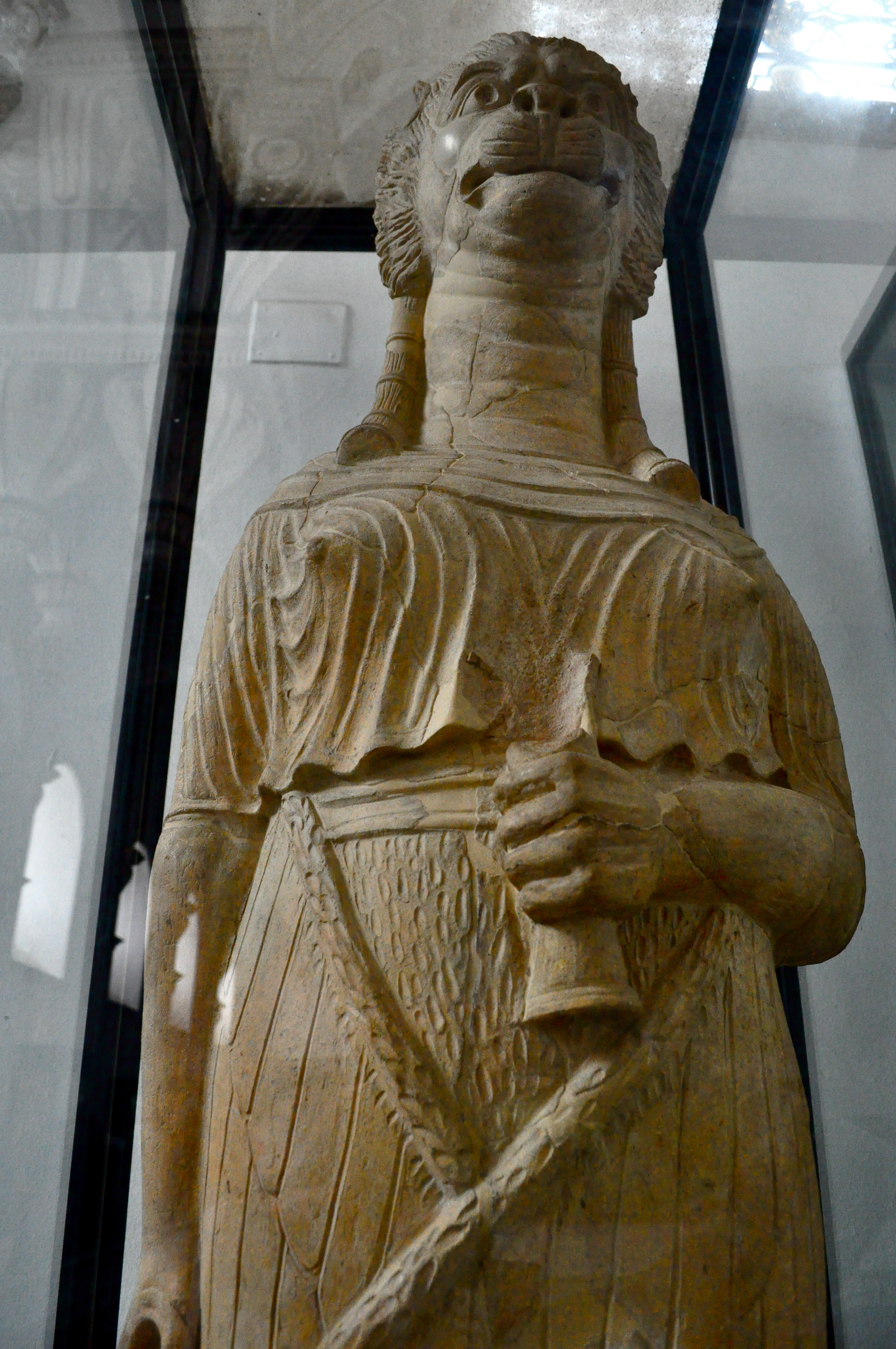
Statue of Tanit leontocephalus

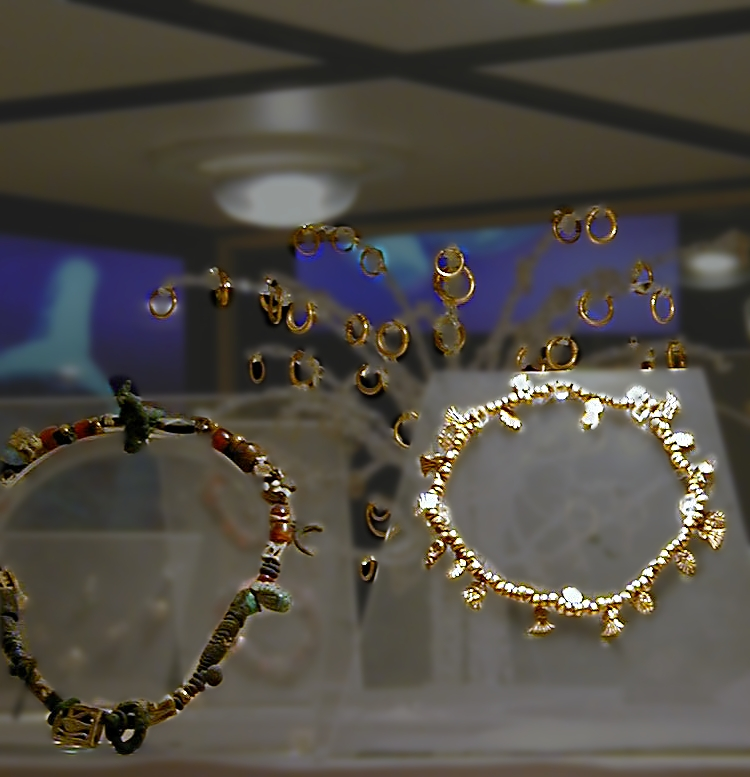
Punic jewelry

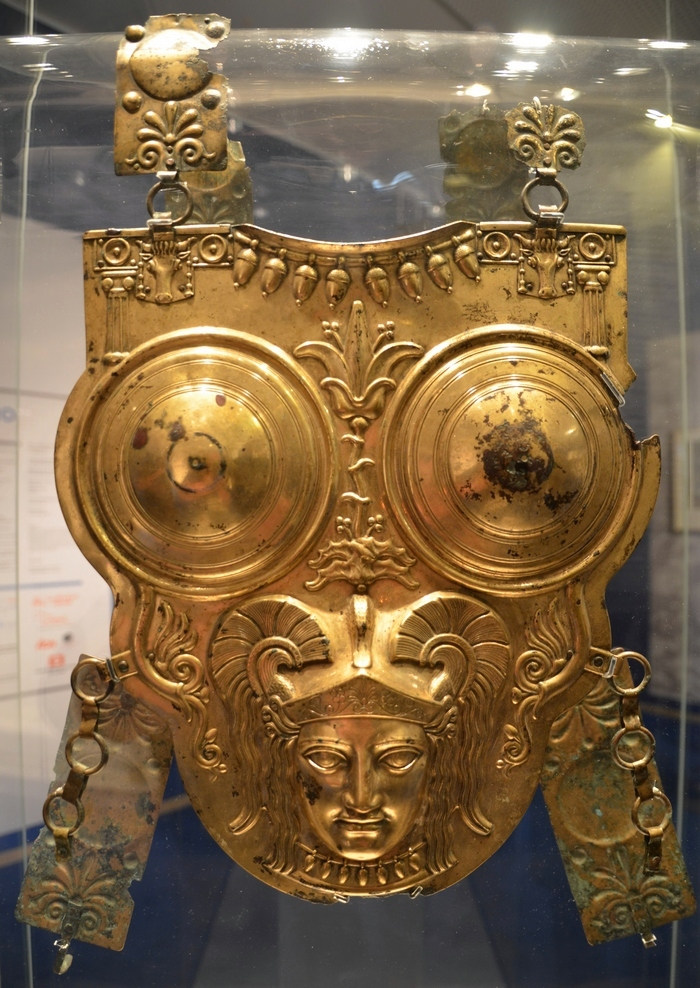
Carthaginian armor from Ksour es-Saf

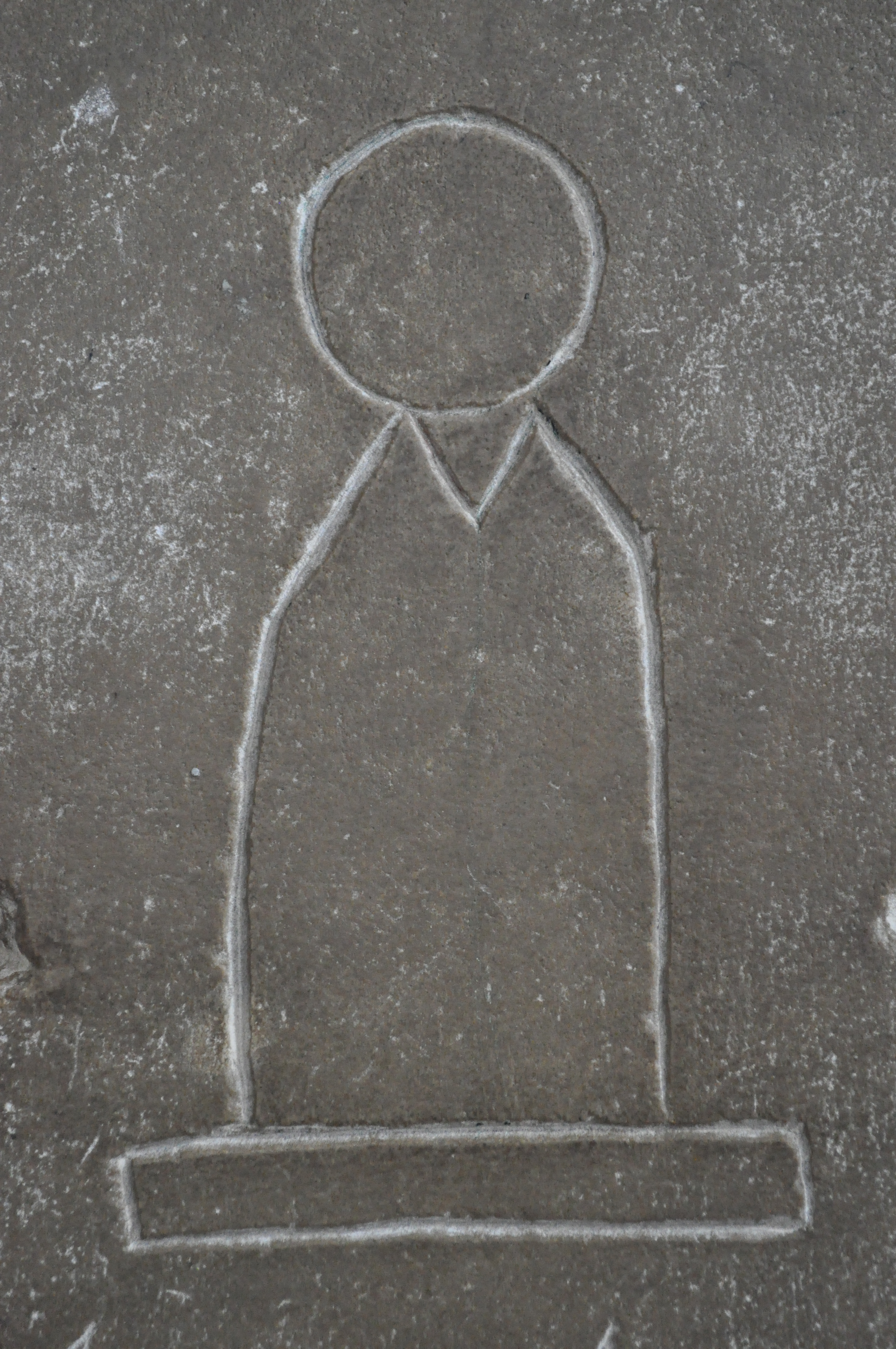
Bottle idol on a stele

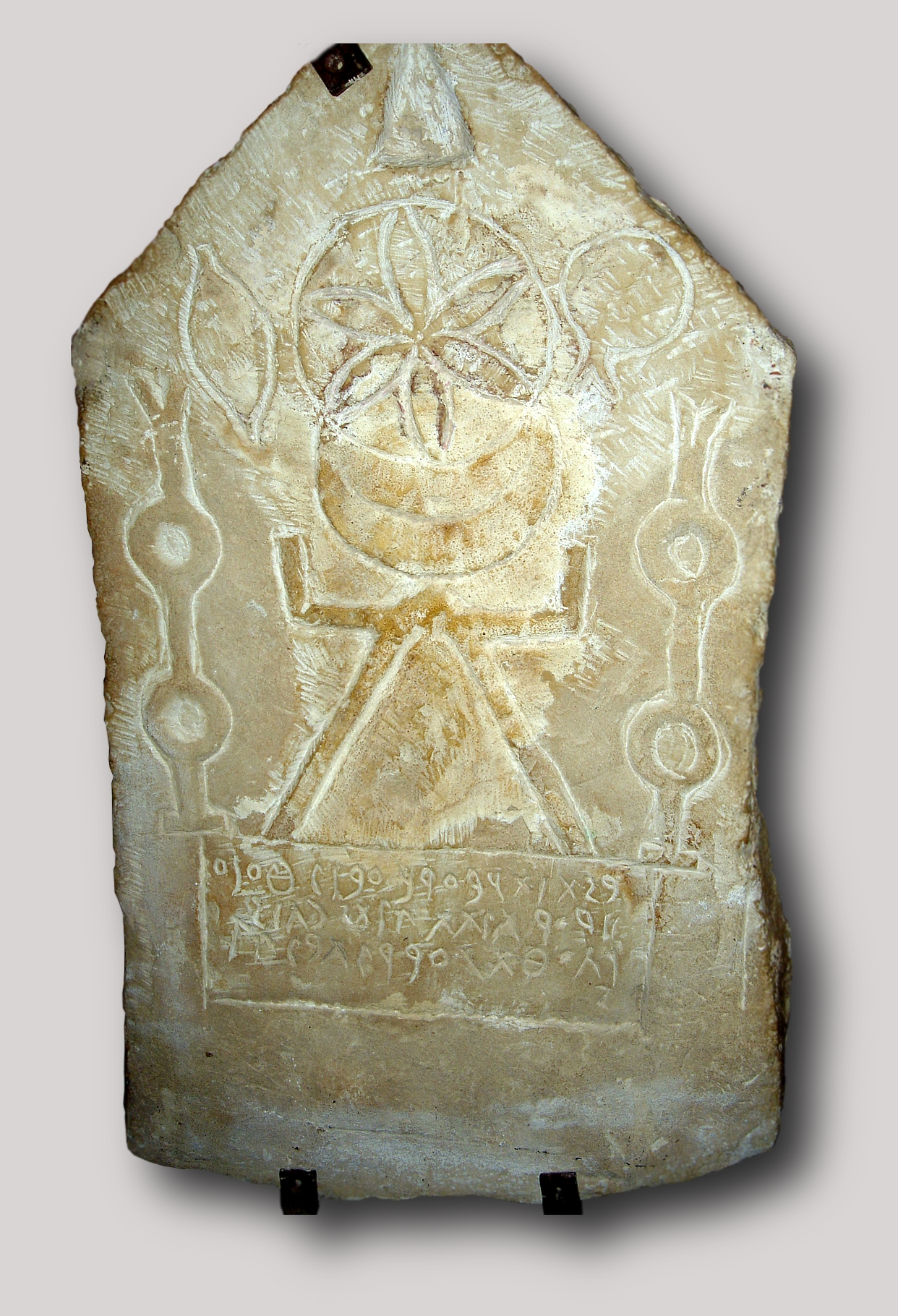
Stele of Tanit (Carthaginian goddess of fertility)

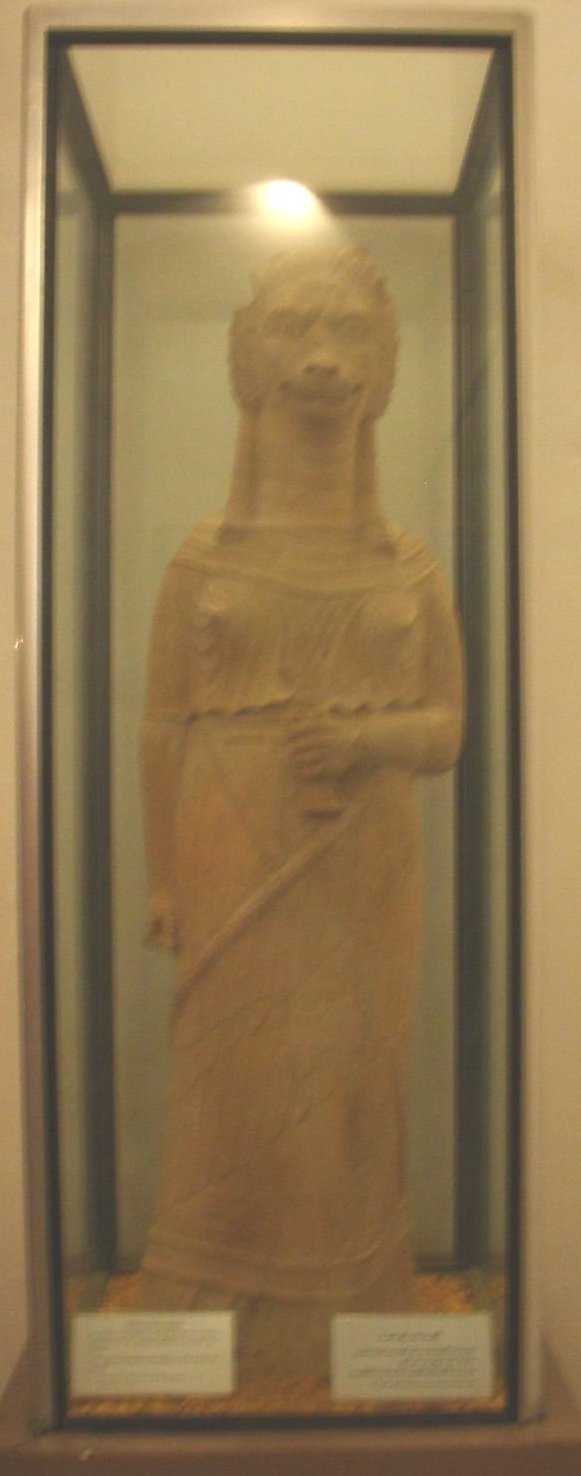
Punic statue

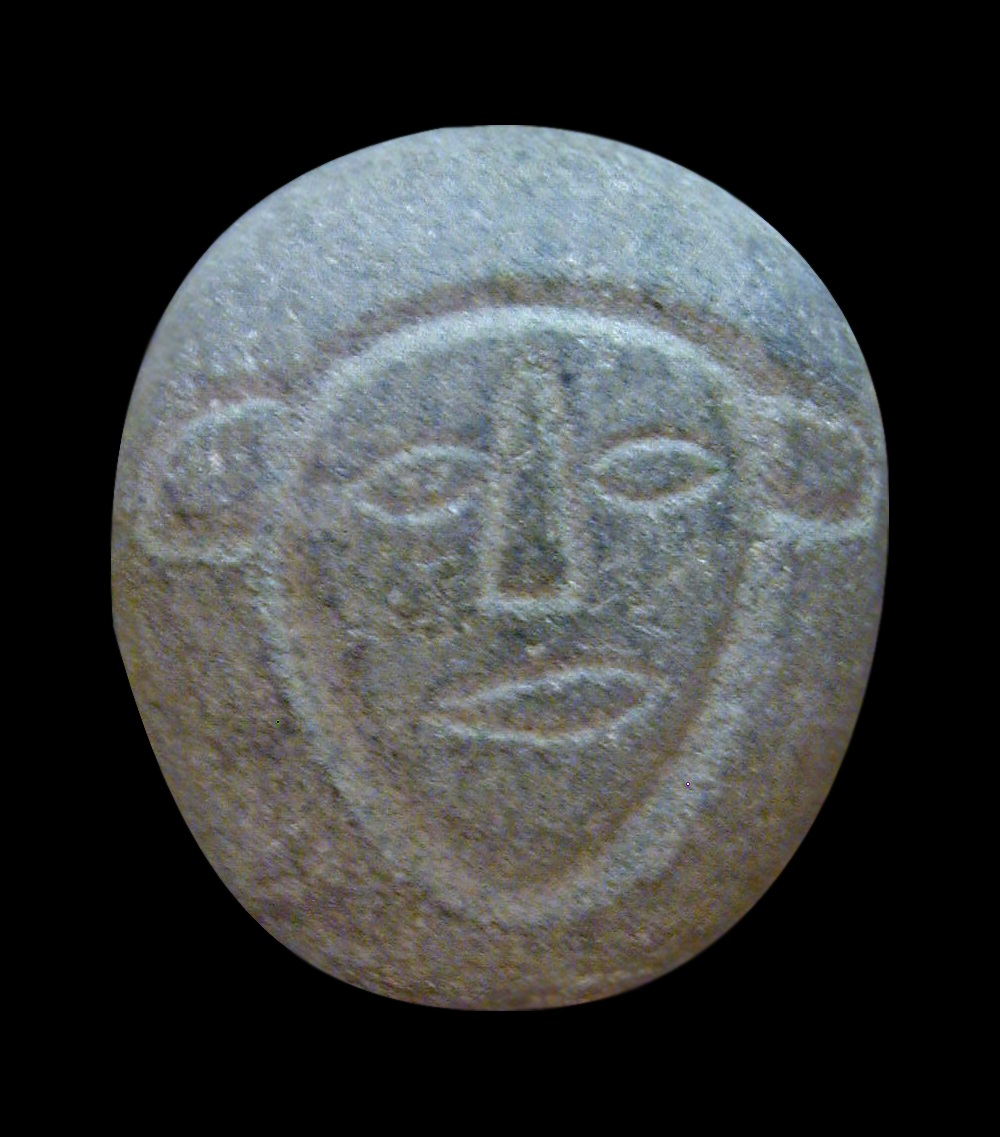
Carthaginian granite pebble with figure of deity. 5th century BCE

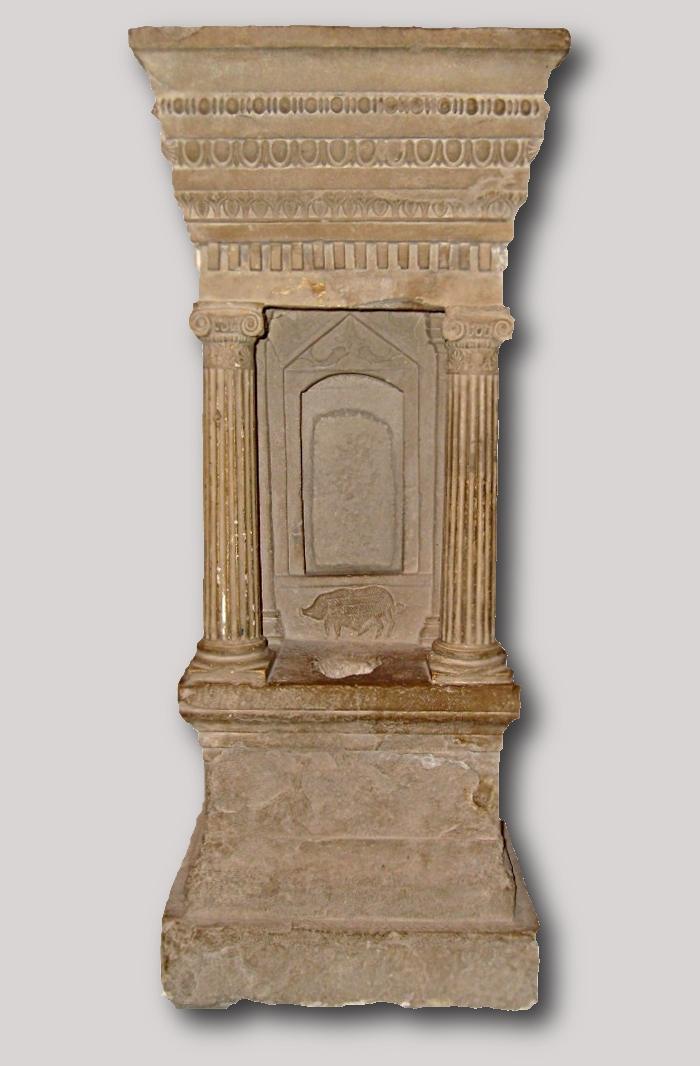
Miniature Punic chapel (naïskos)

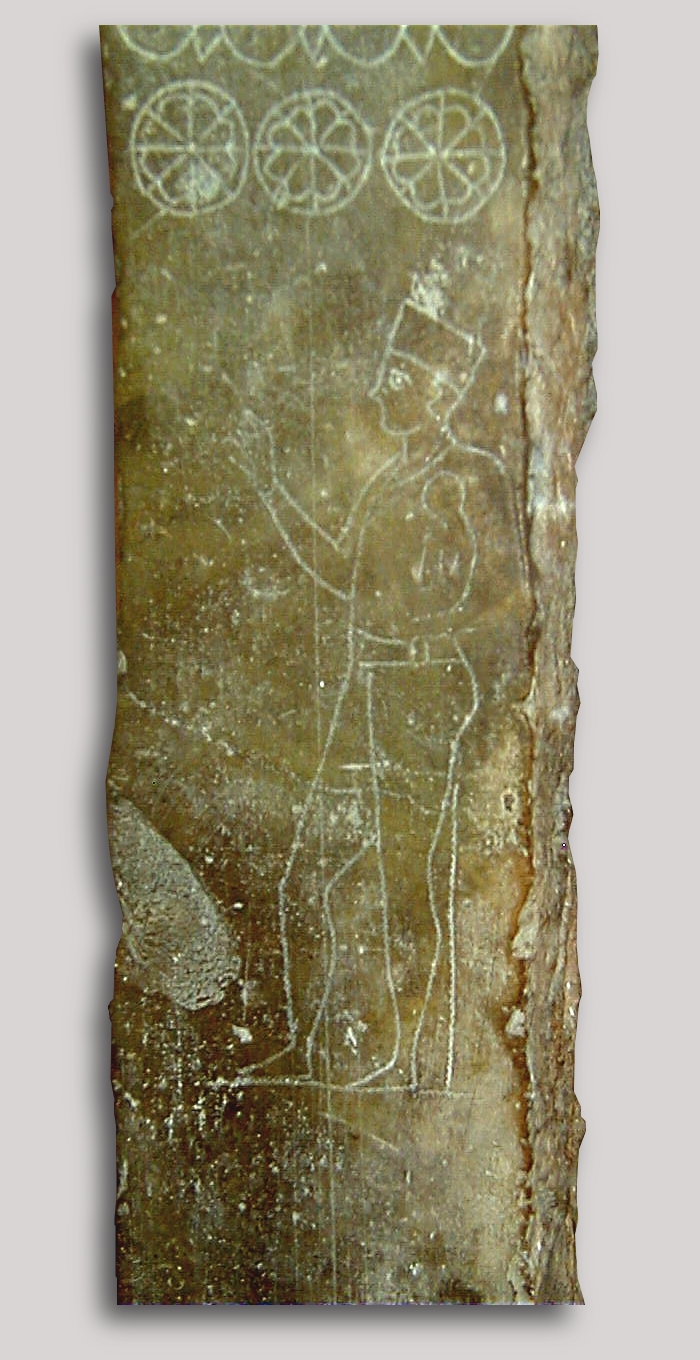
Priest's stele, discovered in Carthage in 1921. (3rd century BCE. J.-C.).

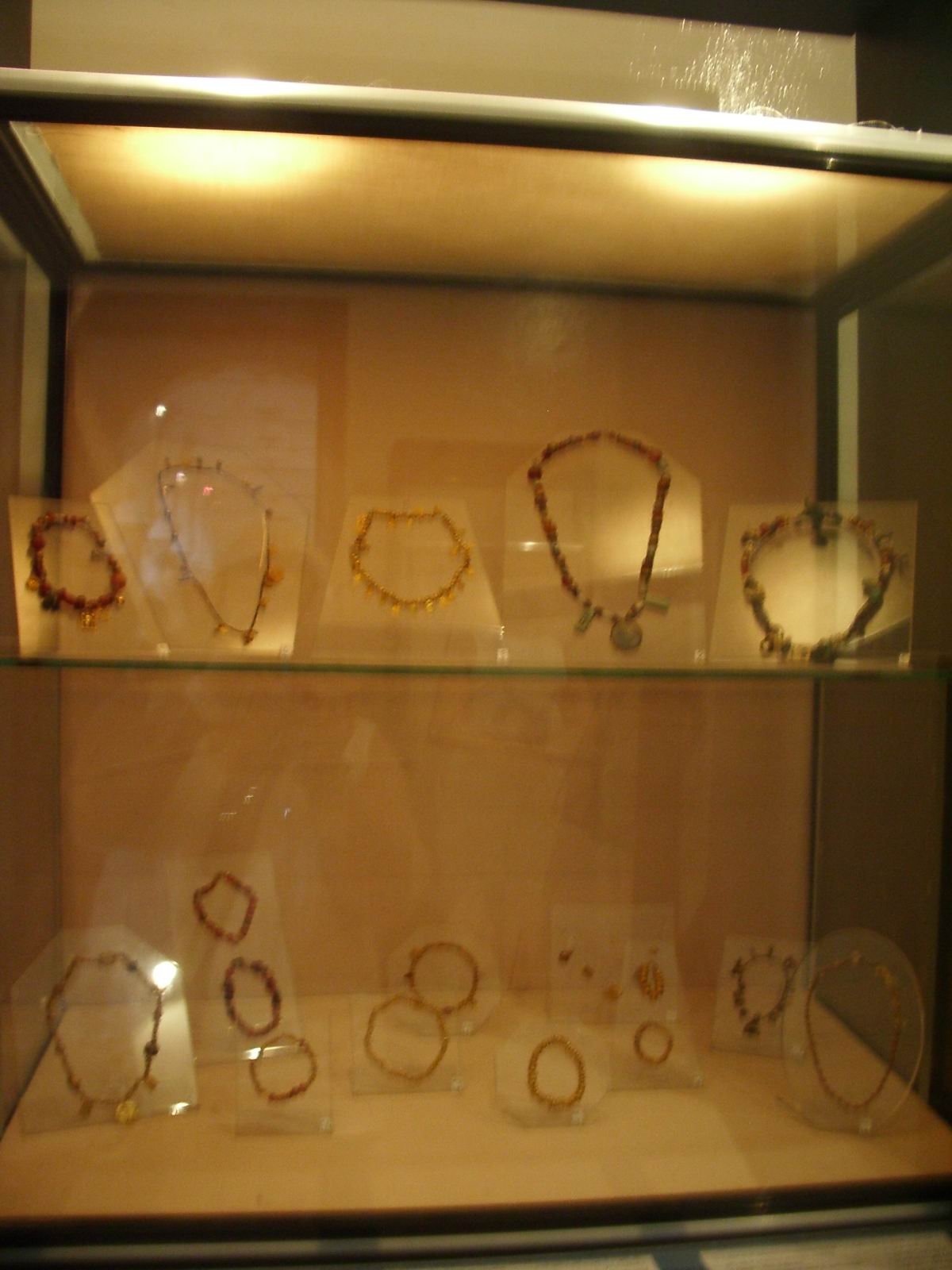
Punic jewellery

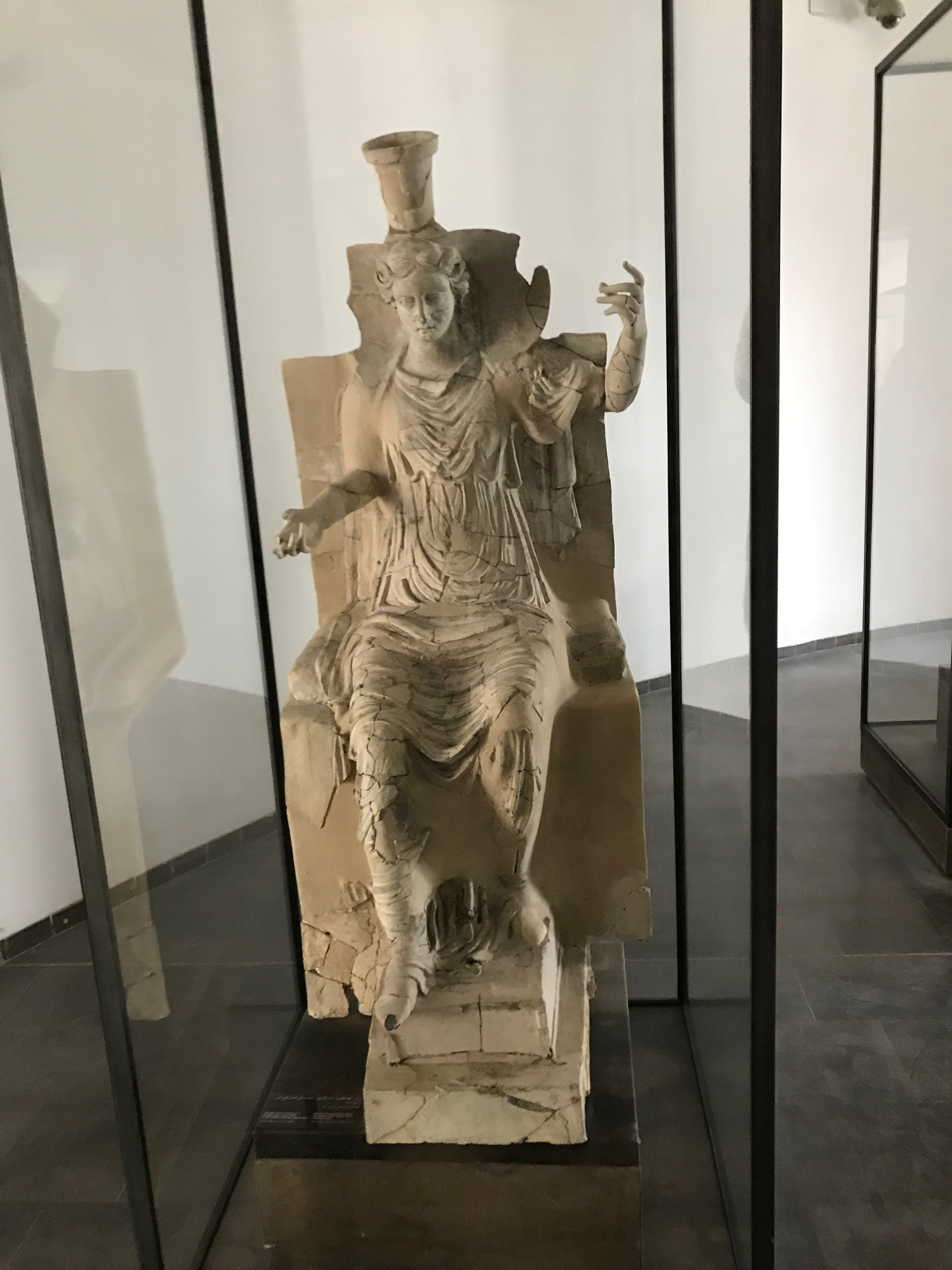
Statue of Demeter

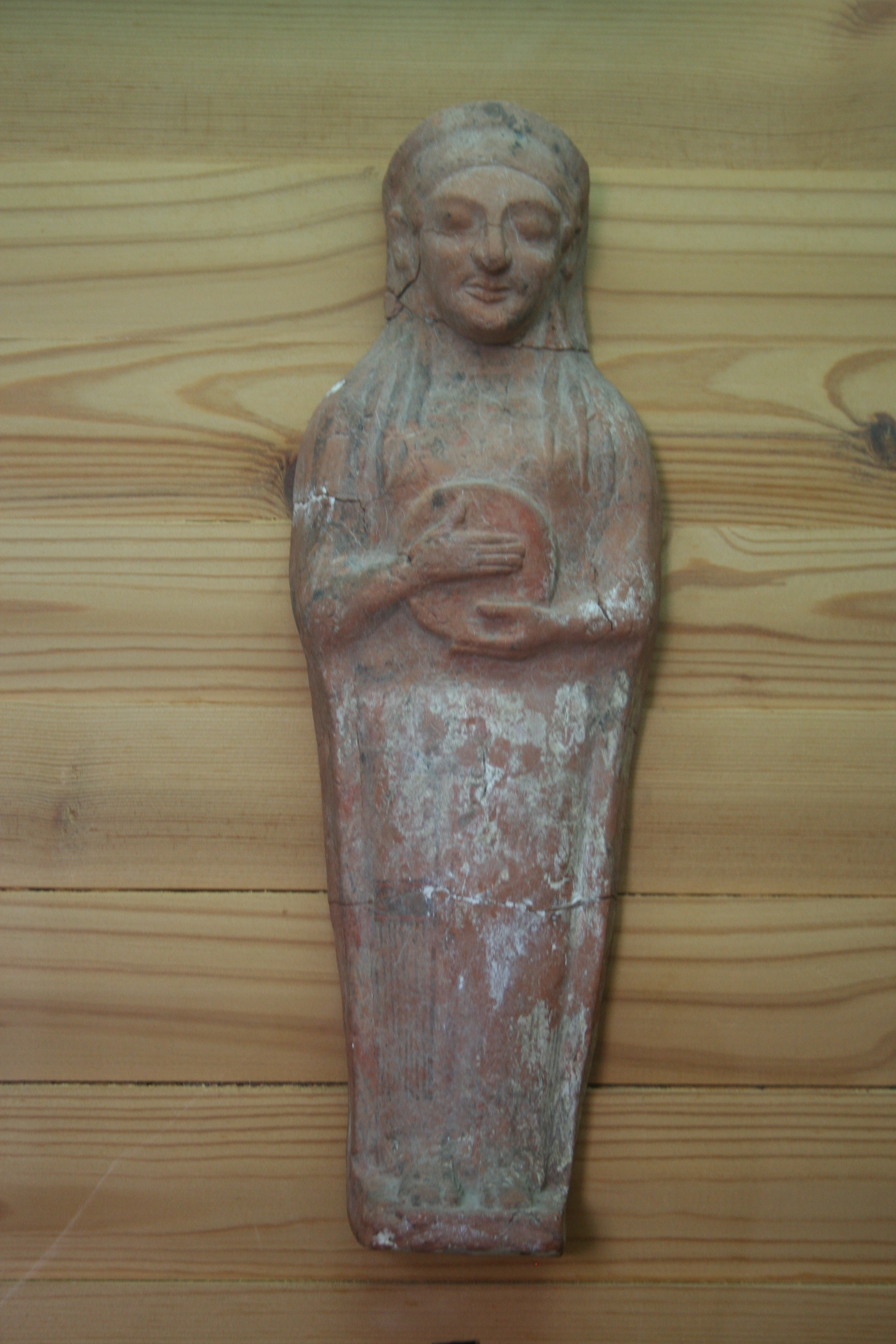
Coroplath statuette holding a tambourine

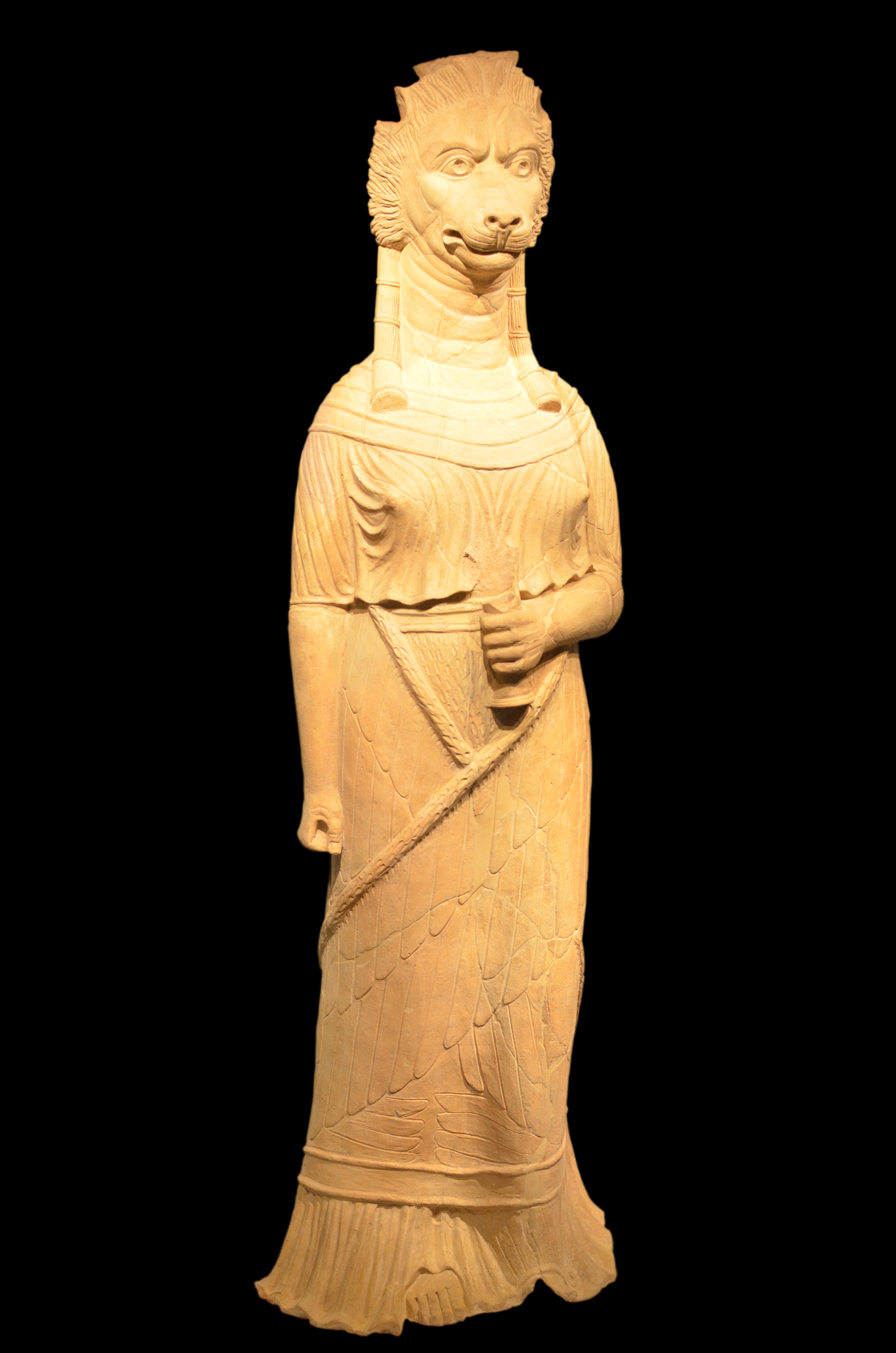
Punic figure of the goddess Tanit with a lion’s head. CE 1st century

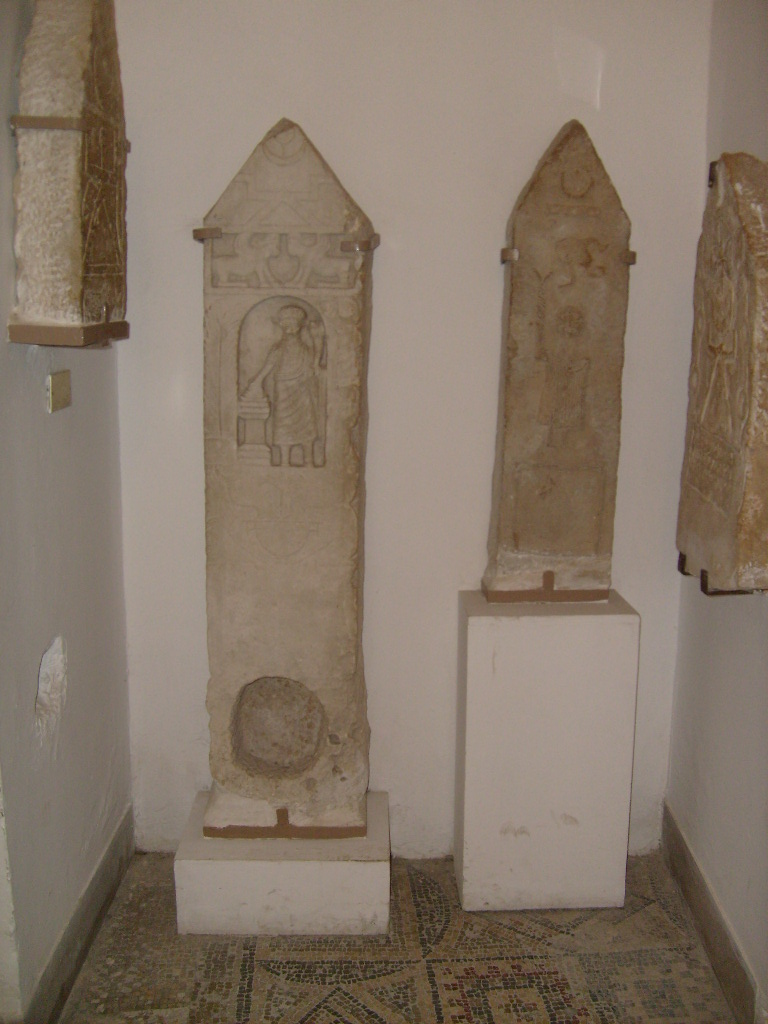
Punic stelae

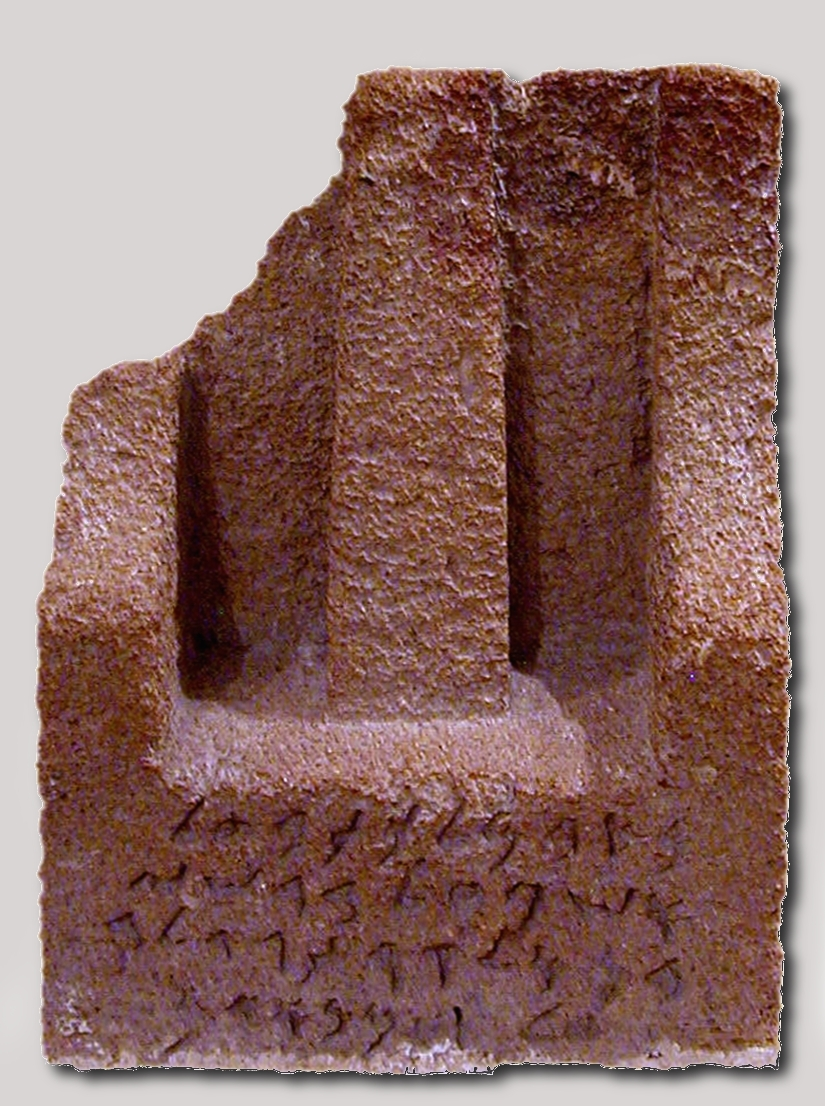
Stele of the tophet of Salammbô

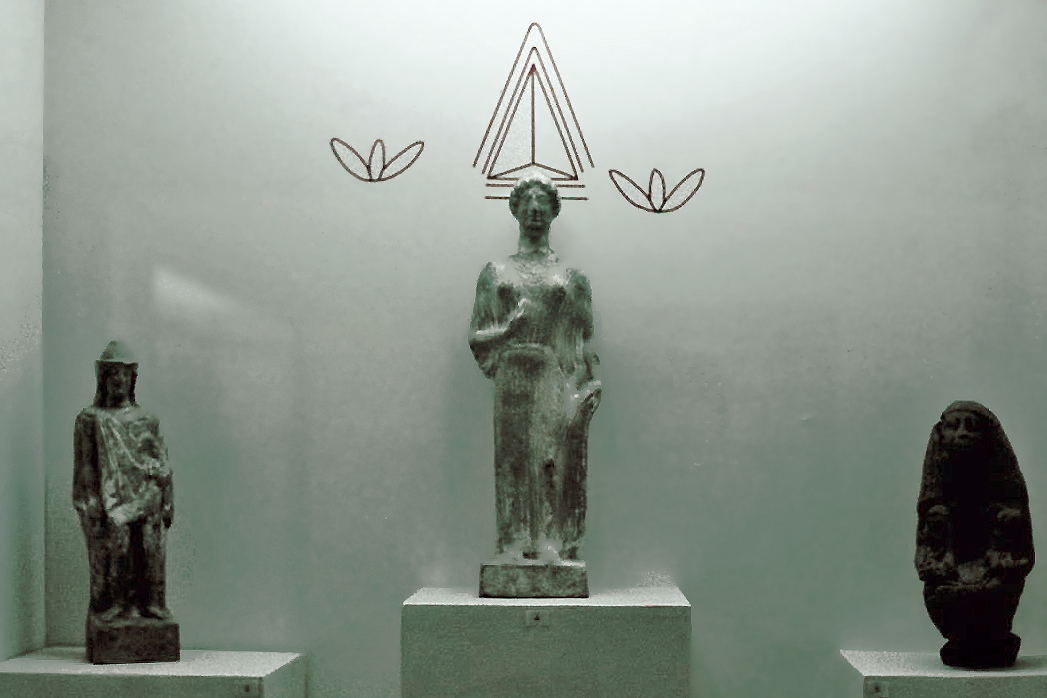
Sculpture of Tanit goddess

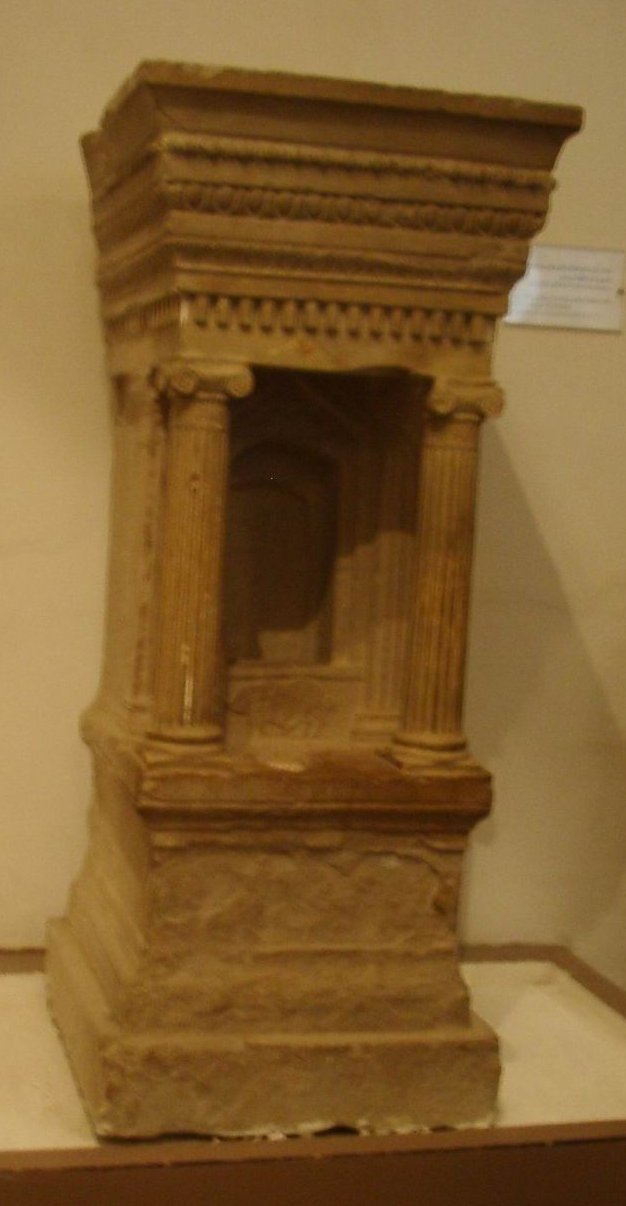
urn to the Bard, "naïskos"

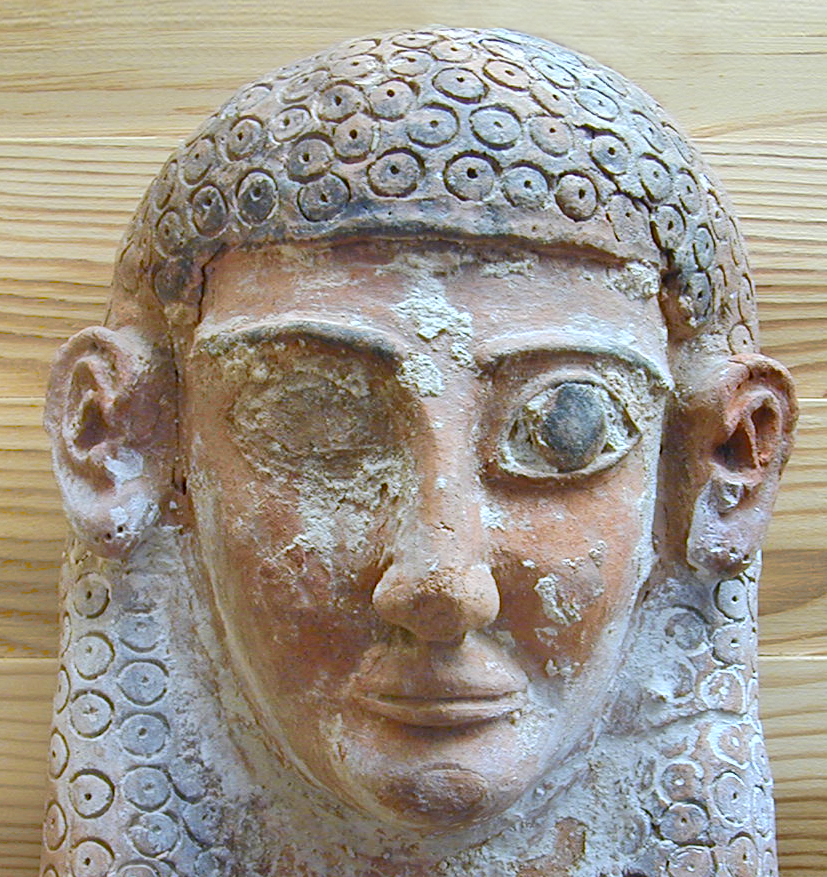
Egyptian style Female mask found in a tomb, known as Protomé Necropolis of Carthage, late 6th - 5th century BCE.

=== "Famous mosaics" ===
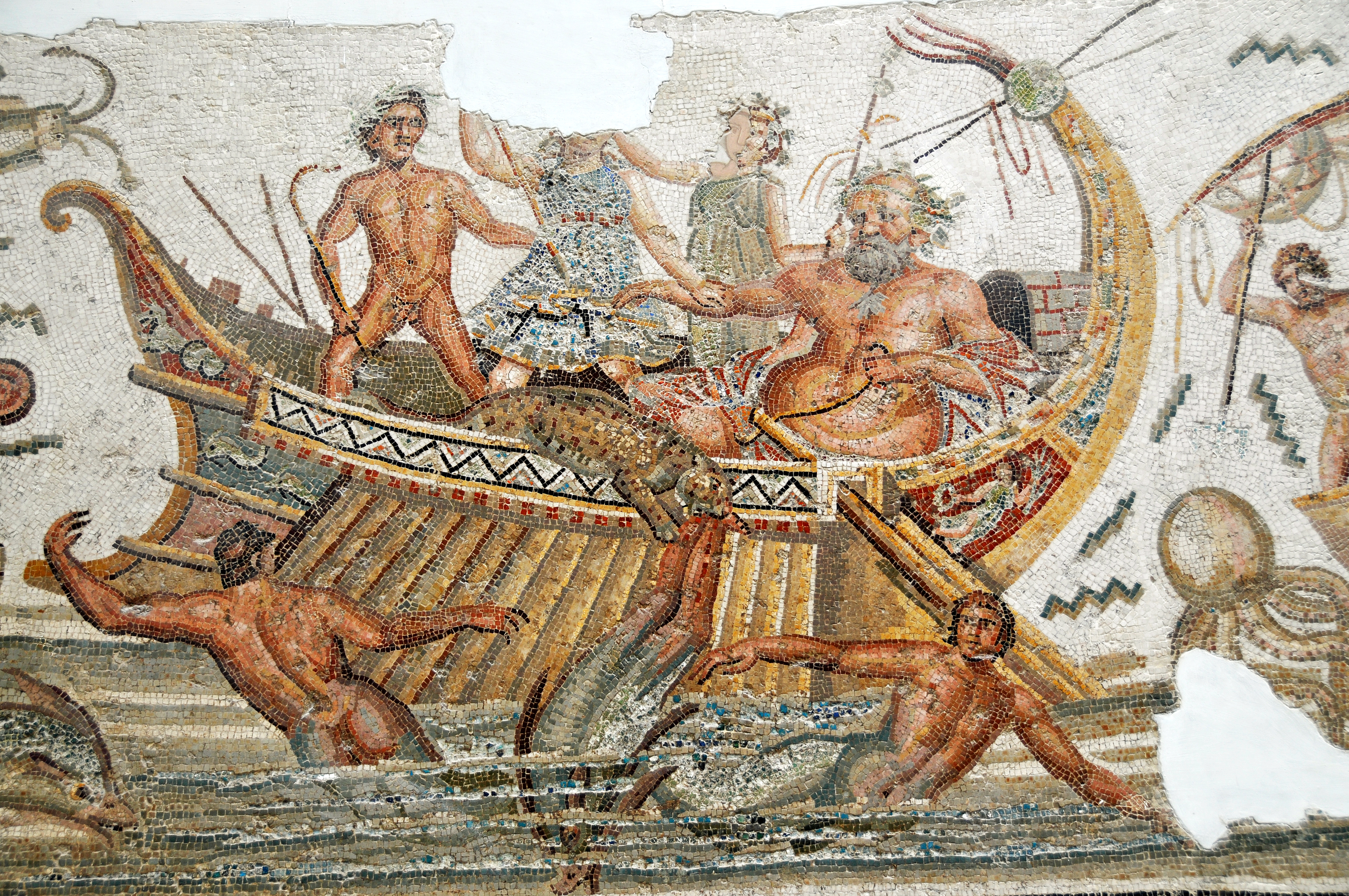
Detail of the Ulysses Mosaic

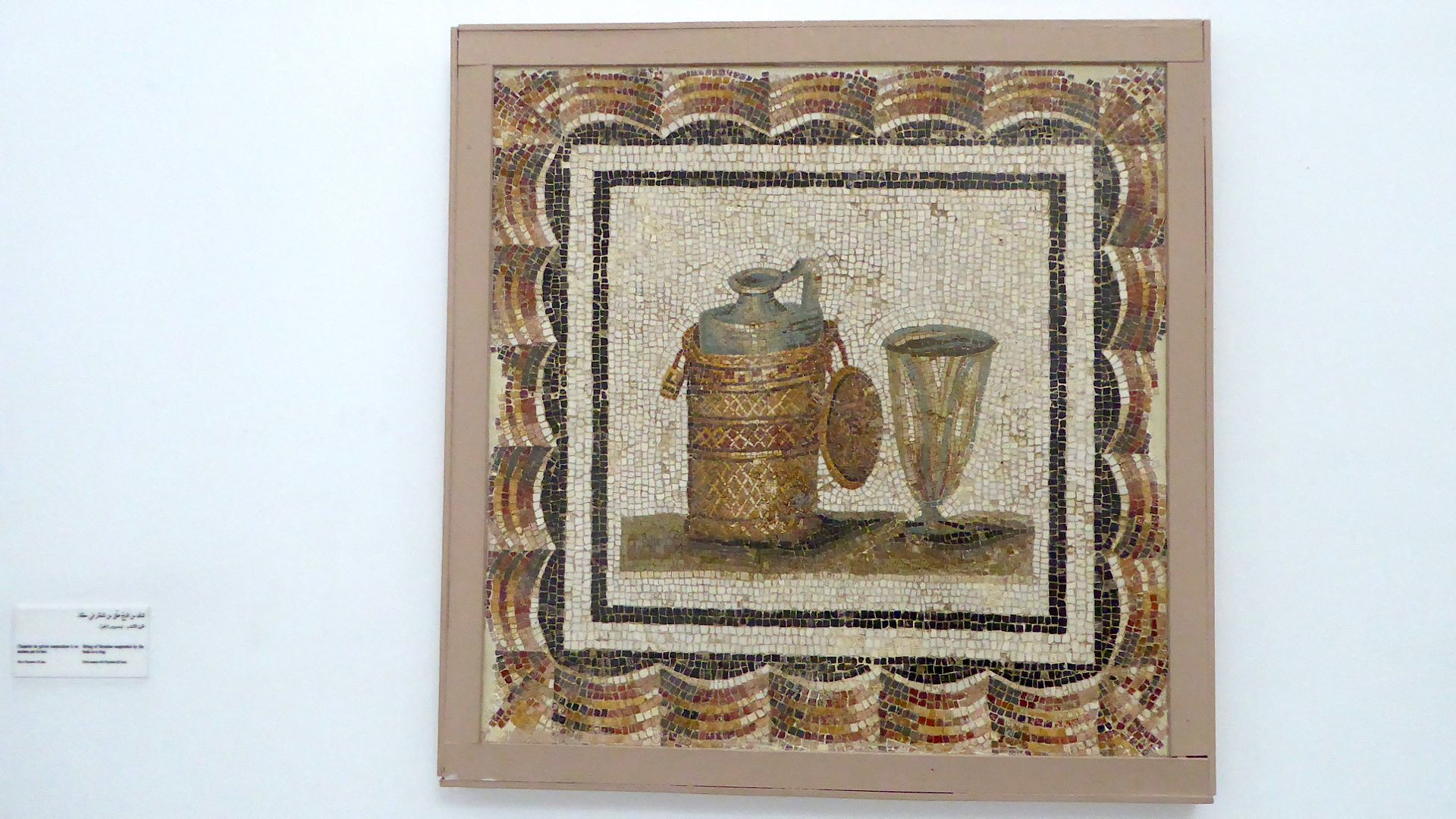
Mosaic of a bottle of wine (2. Jhdt.n.Chr., El Jem-Thysdrus)

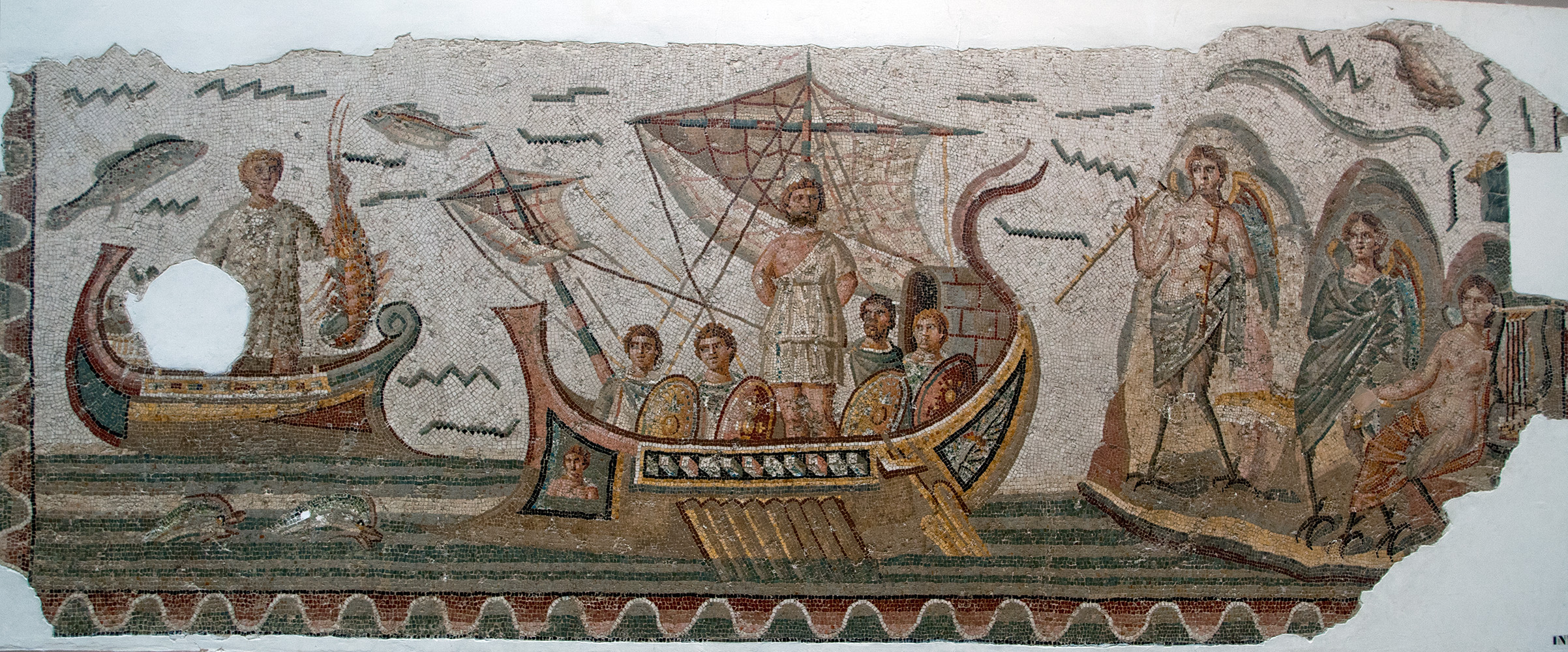
Ulysses Mosaic

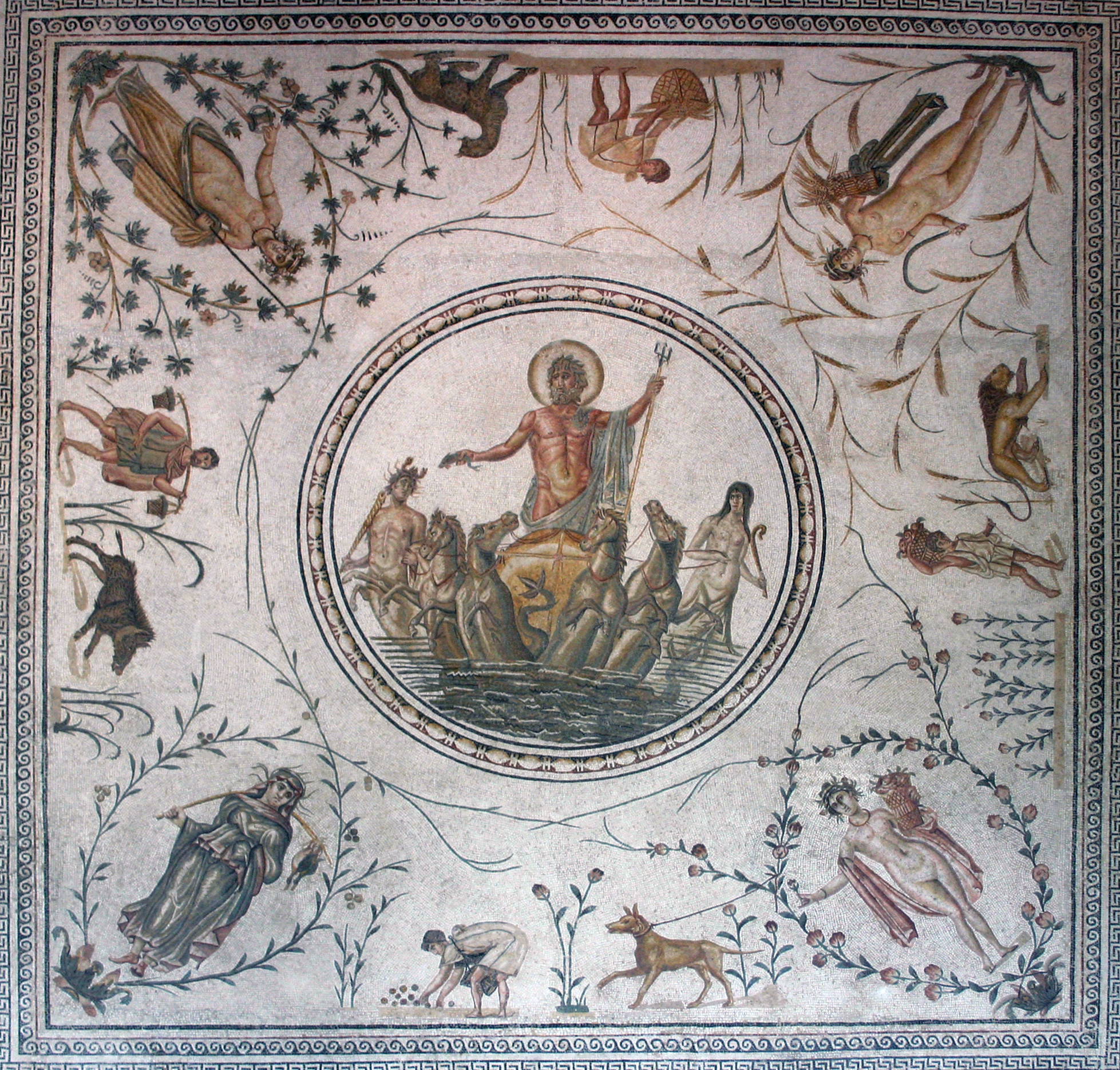
Neptune Roman Mosaic

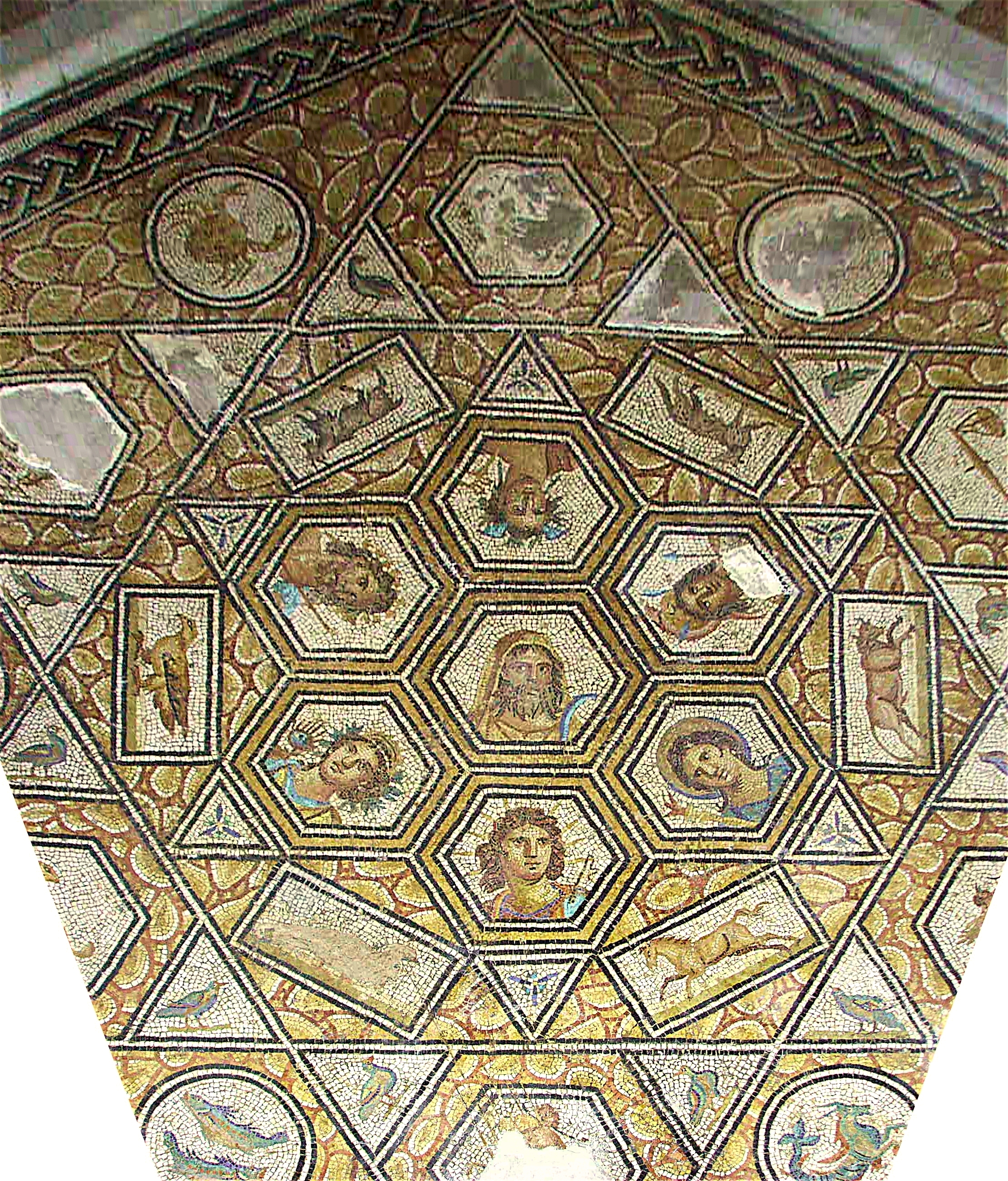
Zodiac mosaic

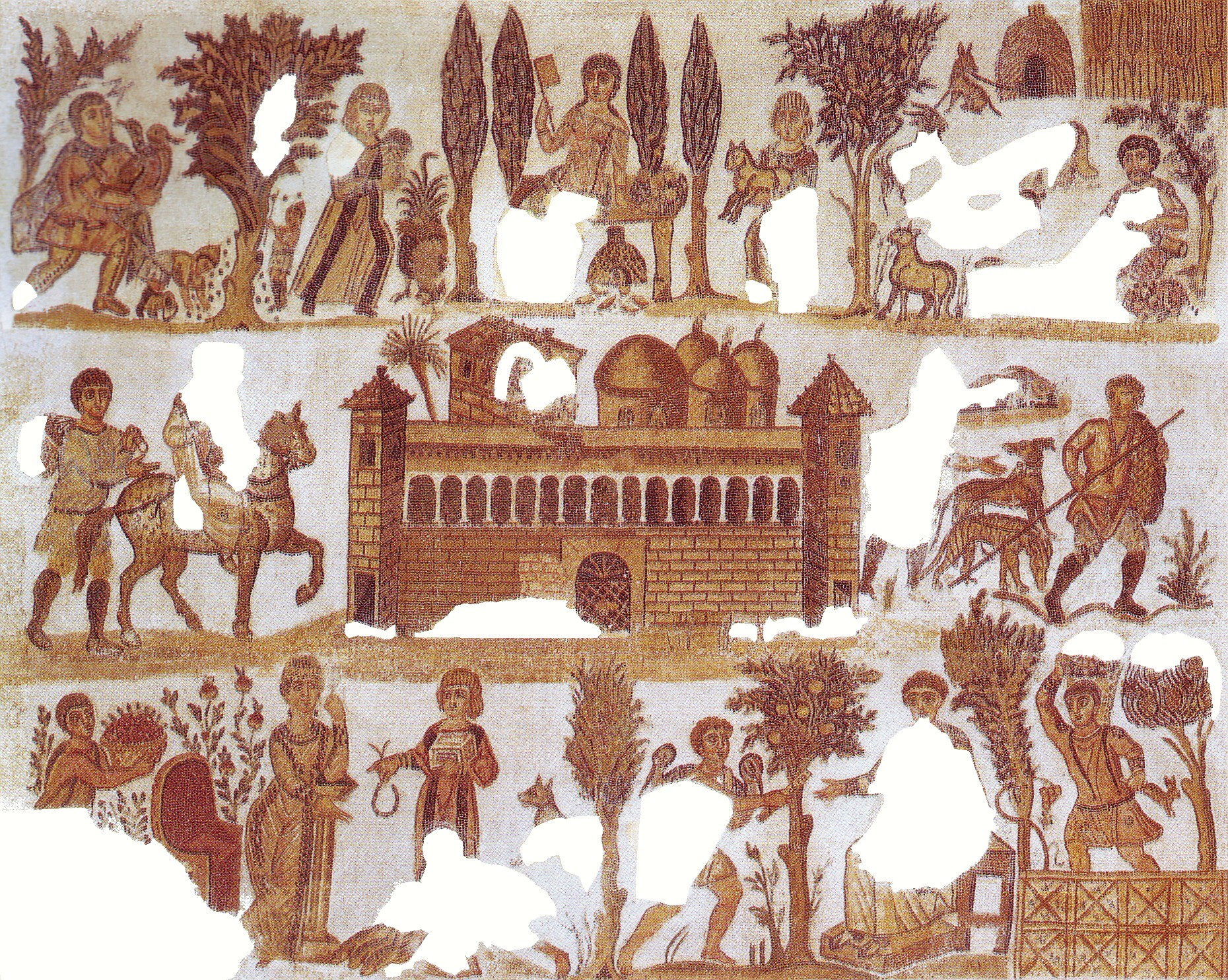
Seignor Julius mosaic, CE 5th century, Carthage

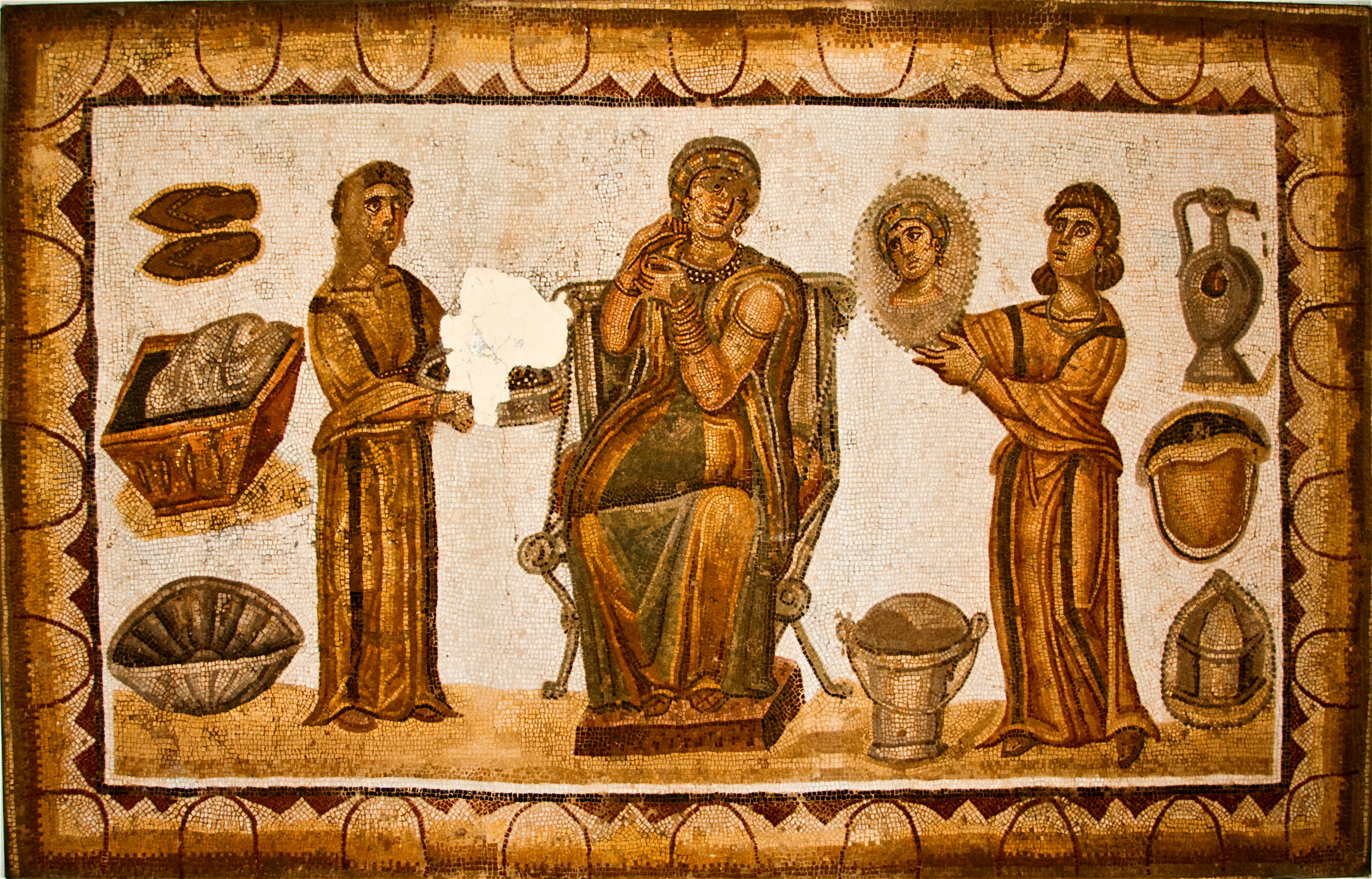
Matron at her toilet, CE 4th century, Carthage

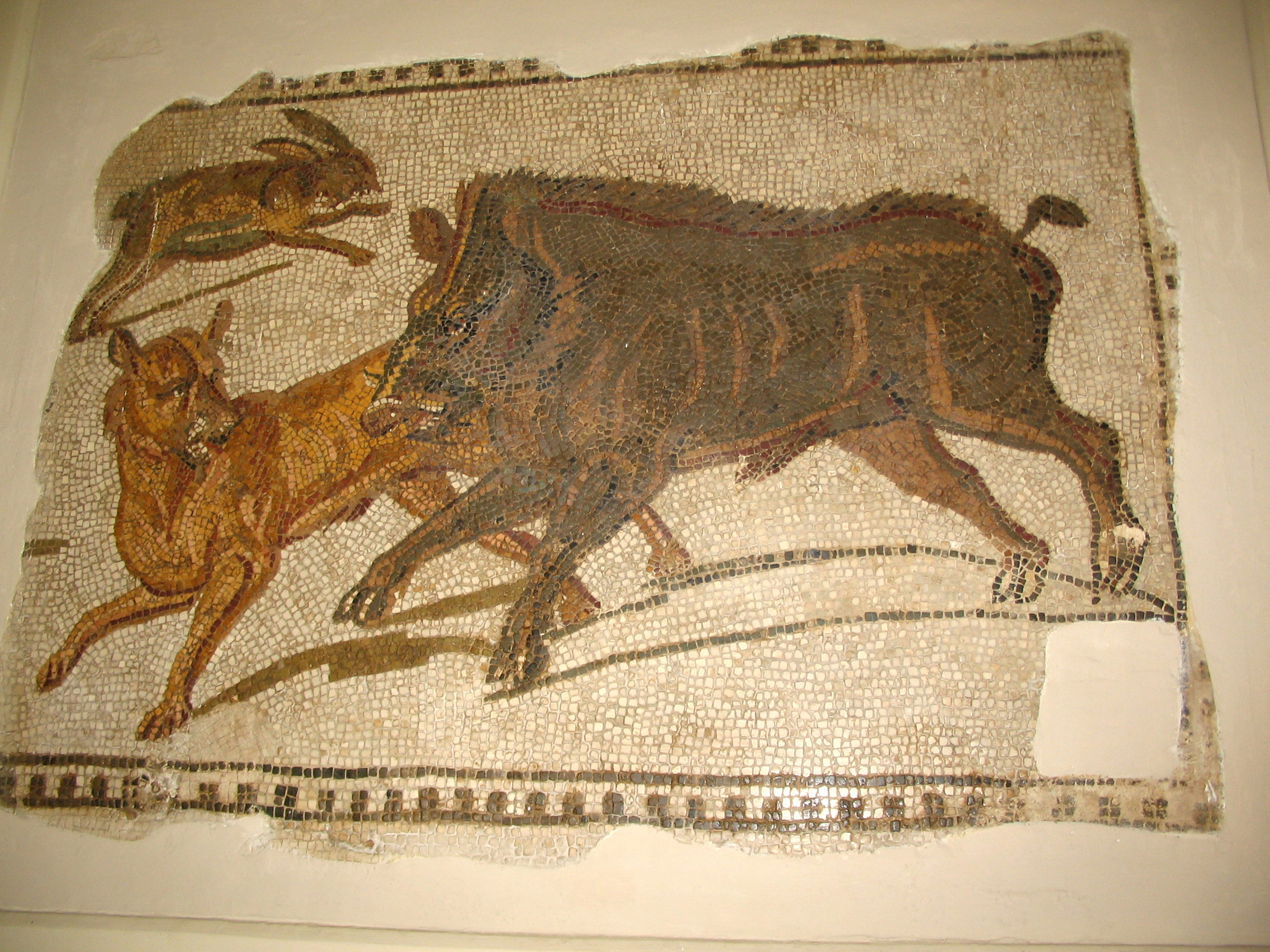
Mosaic of a Wild boar and dog. CE 3rd century

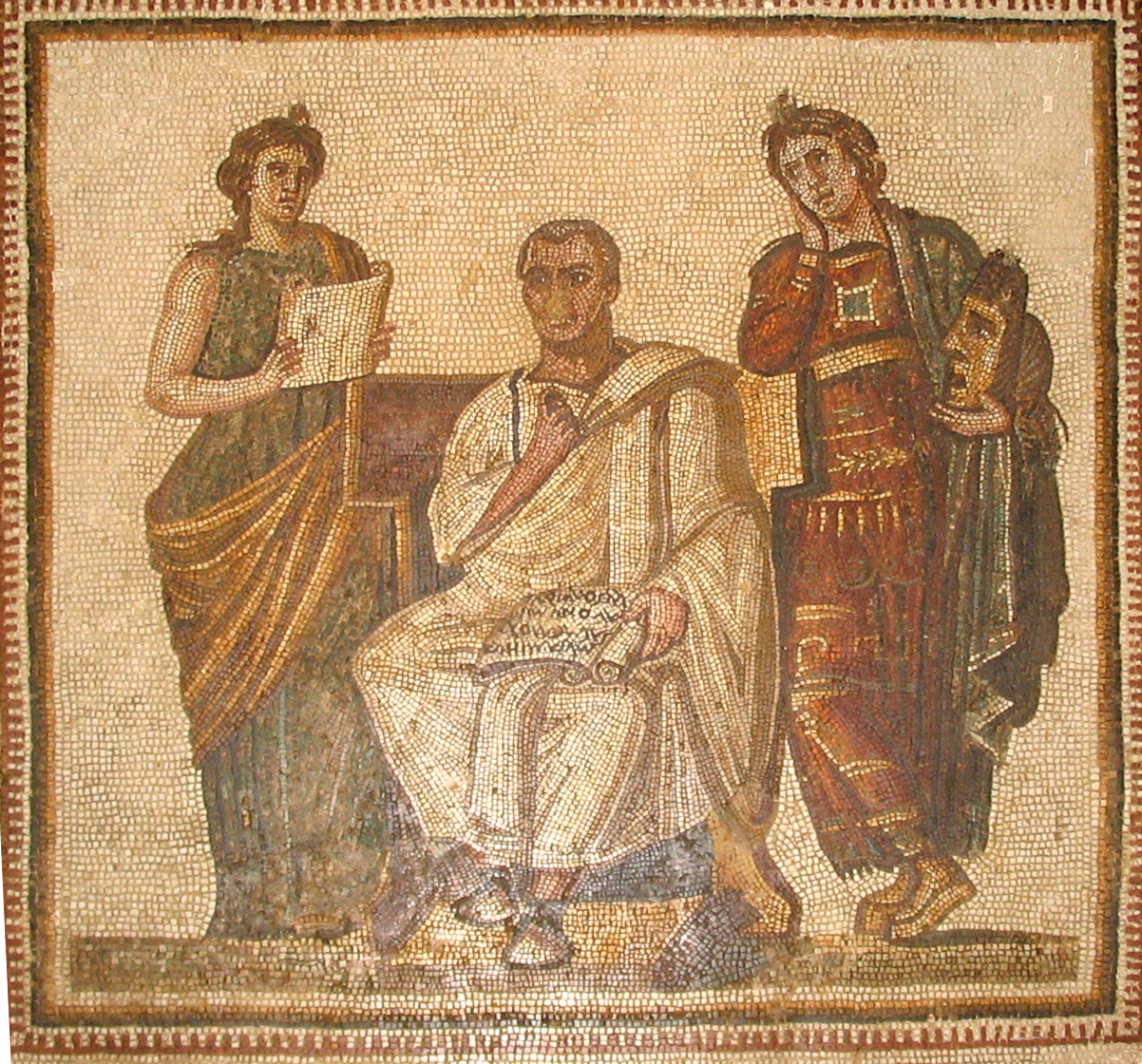
Mosaic of Virgil seated between Clio and Melpomene (from Hadrumetum Sousse). CE 3rd century.

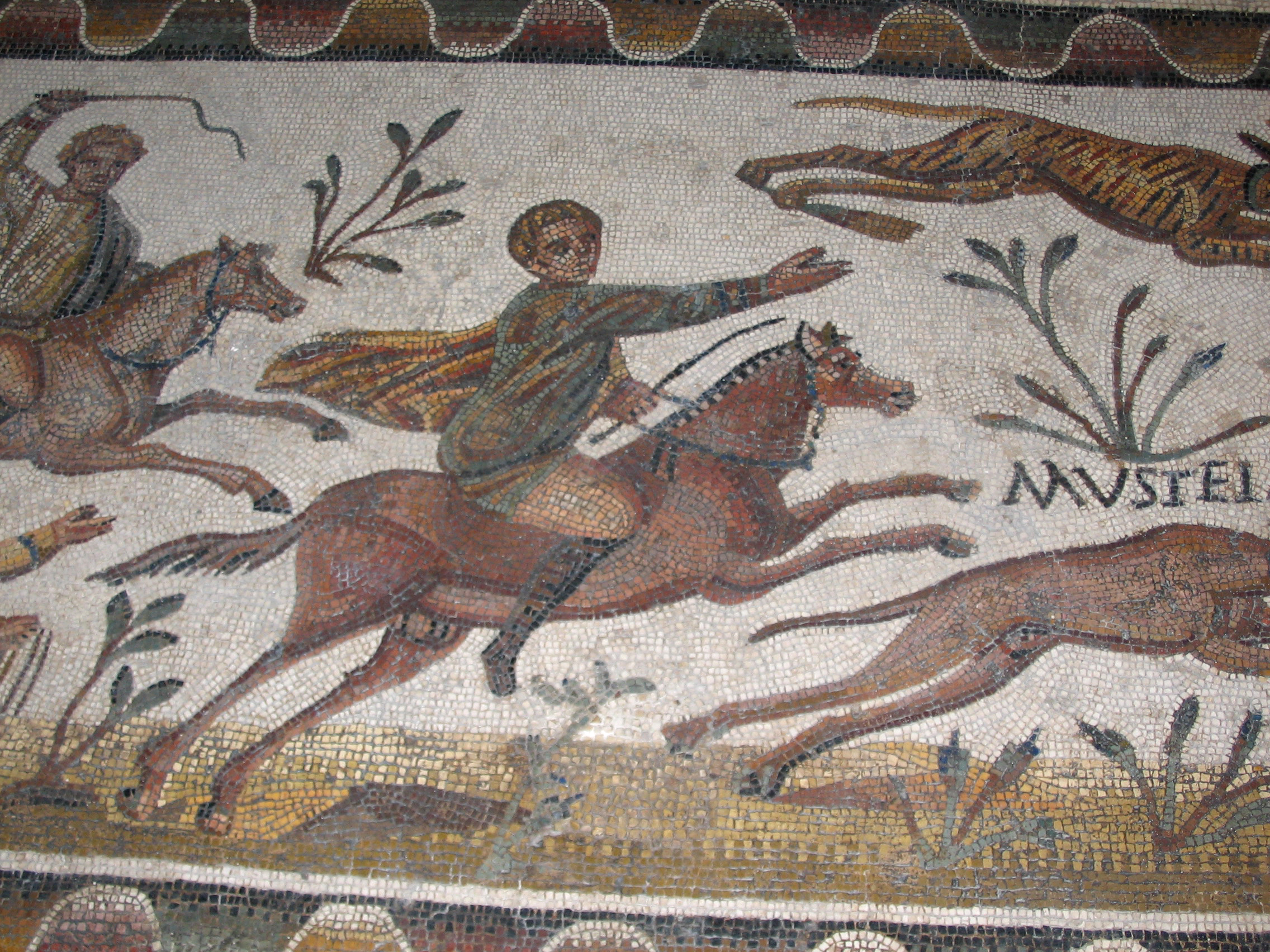
Mosaic of a hunting scene. CE 2nd century

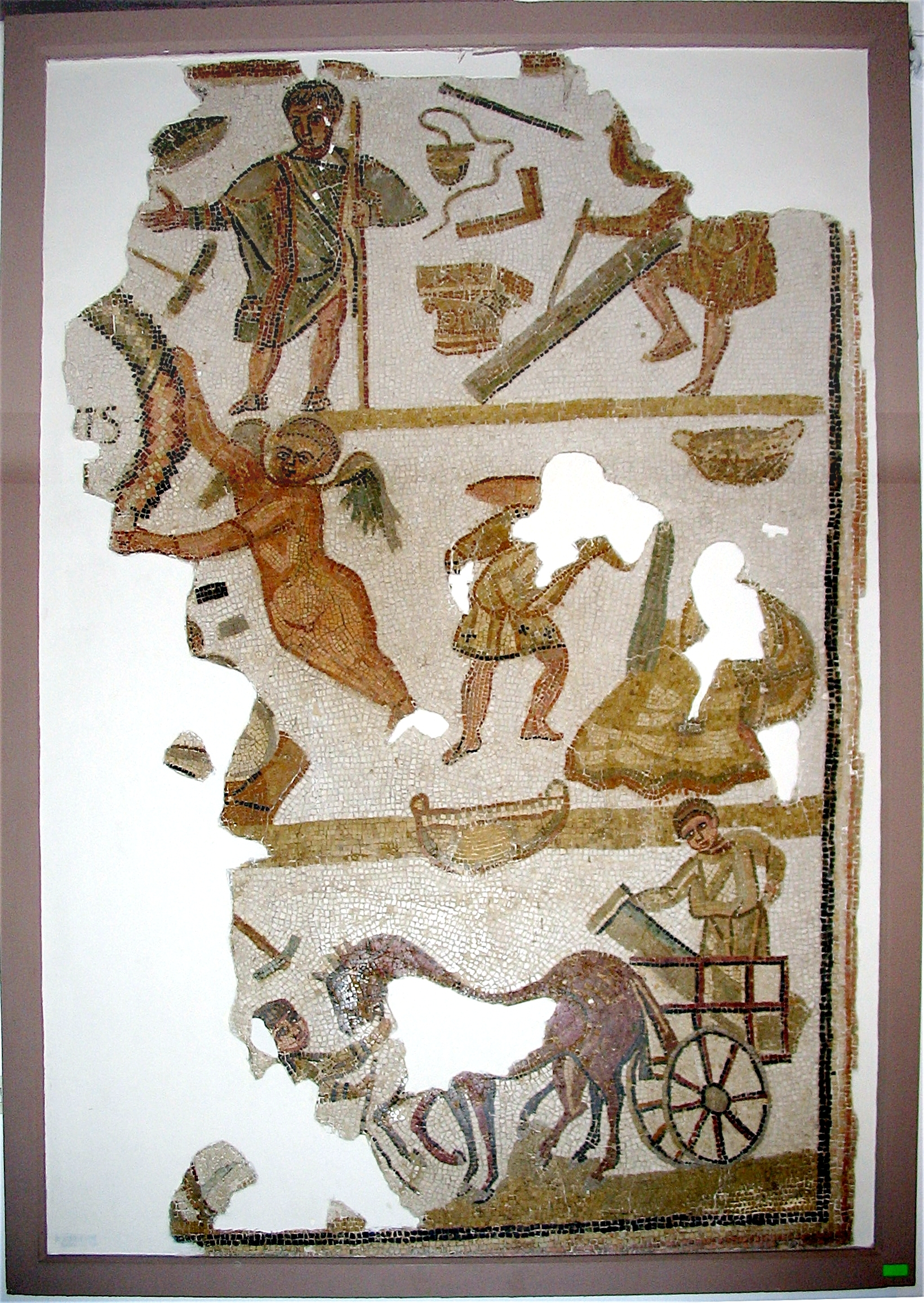
Roman Christian mosaic of bricklayers at work. CE 4th century

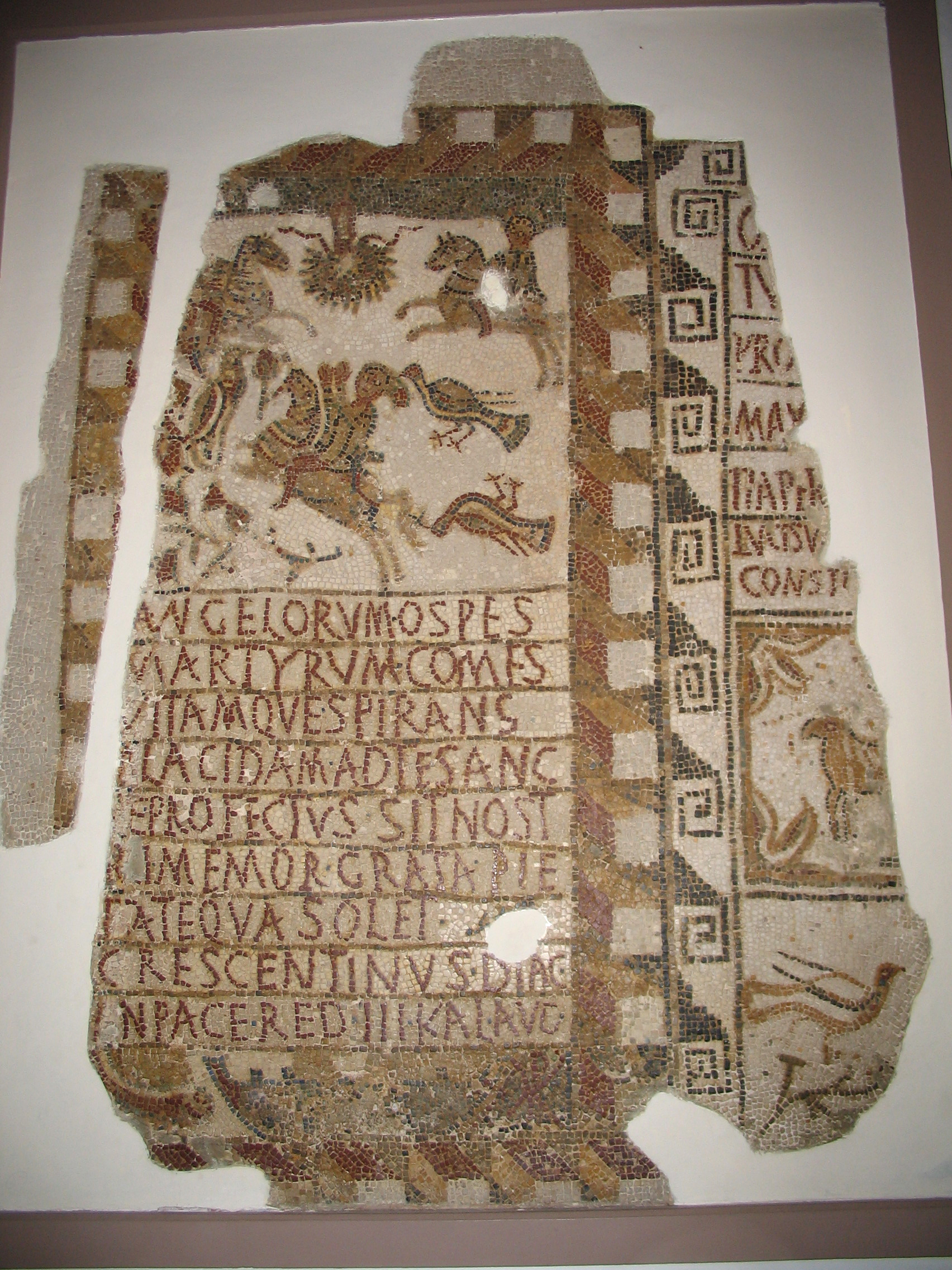
Roman mosaic of "Crescentinus diaconus", dating from the CE 4th century. The inscription translates: "The host of the angels, the count of the martyrs, and breathing a peaceful life, may he go to you in a holy manner. Our memory, with the gracious piety with which the deacon Crescentinus is accustomed, returned in peace the 3rd Augustus Kalends."

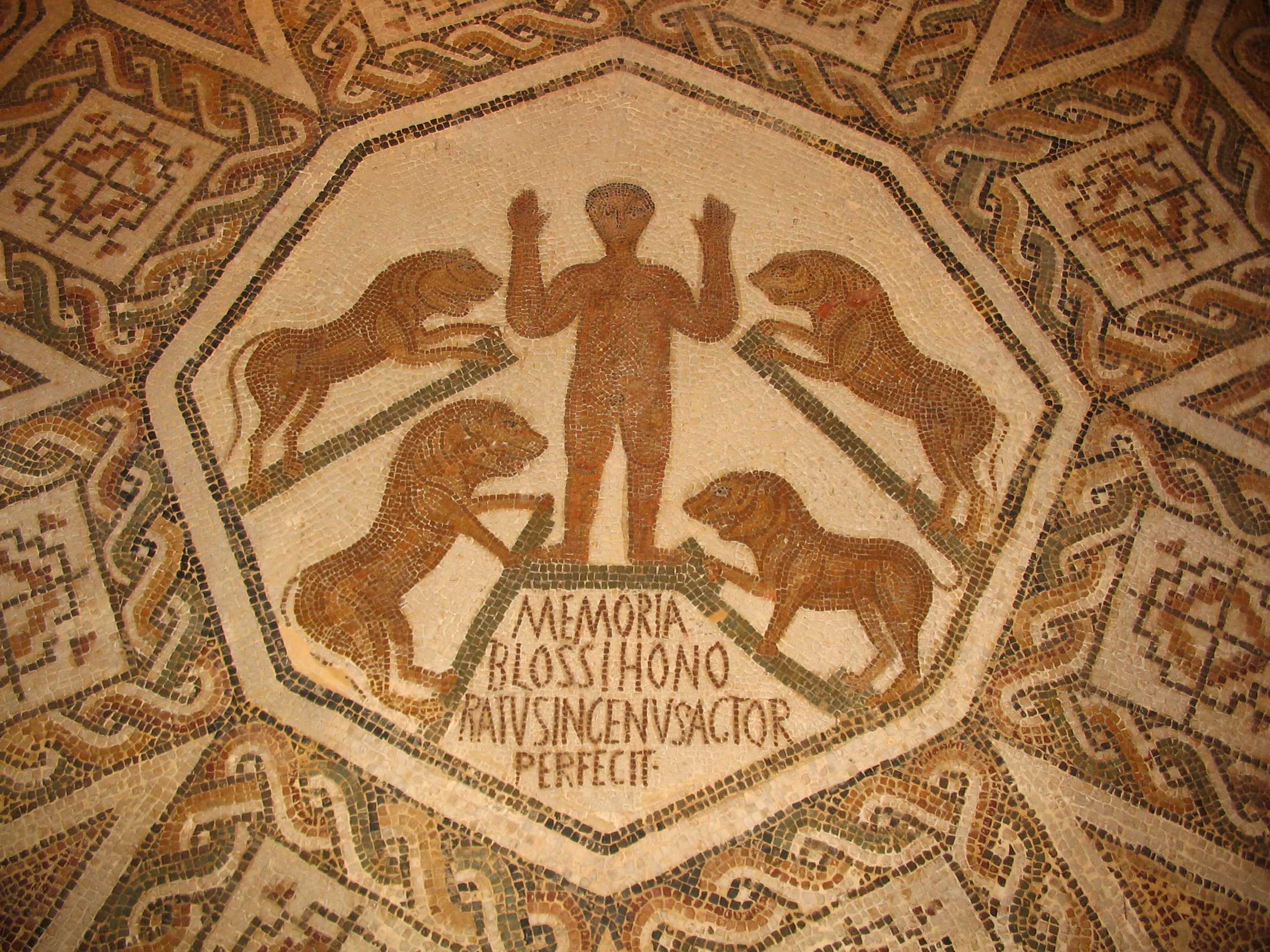
A Roman Christian mosaic called "Daniel among the Lions". CE 4th century

=== "Famous sculptures" ===
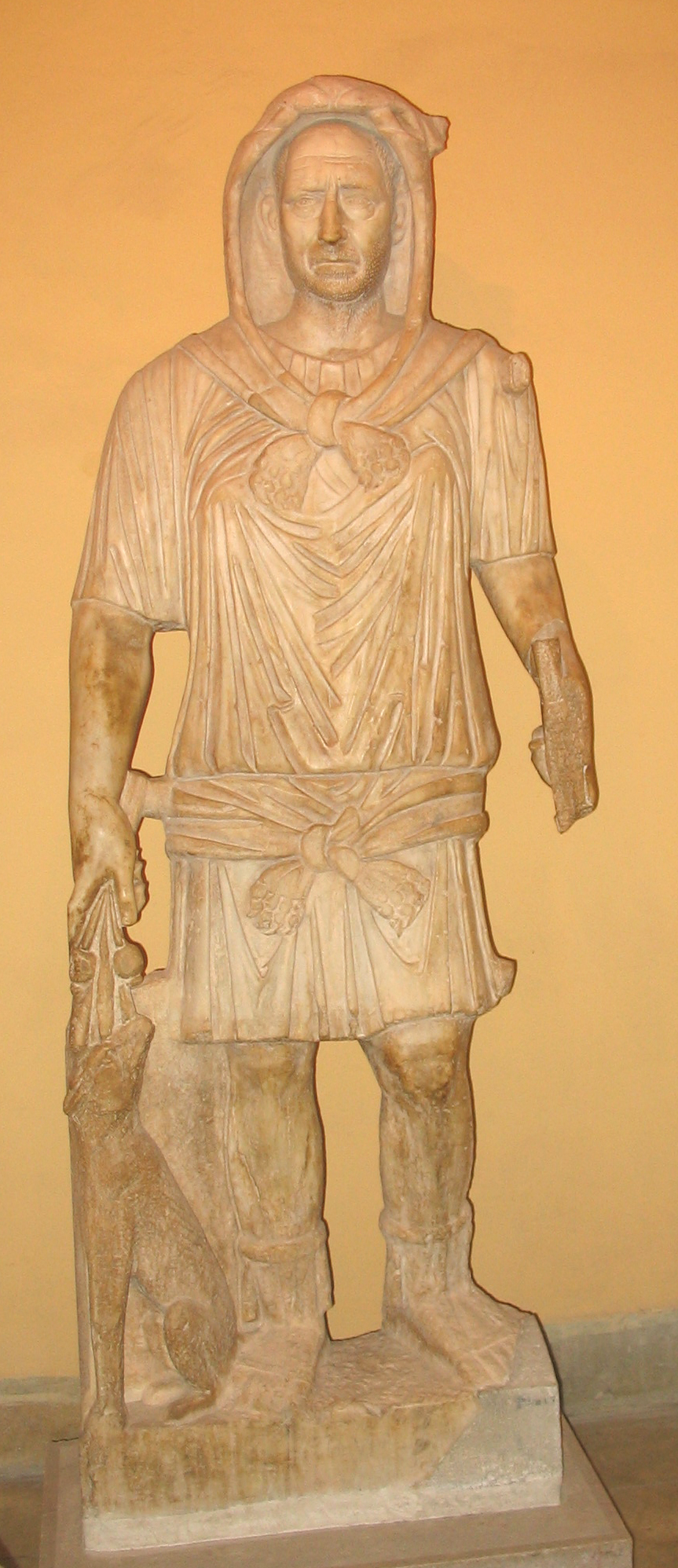
Roman commemorative sculpture, in which the deceased is dressed as Hercules. CE 3rd century

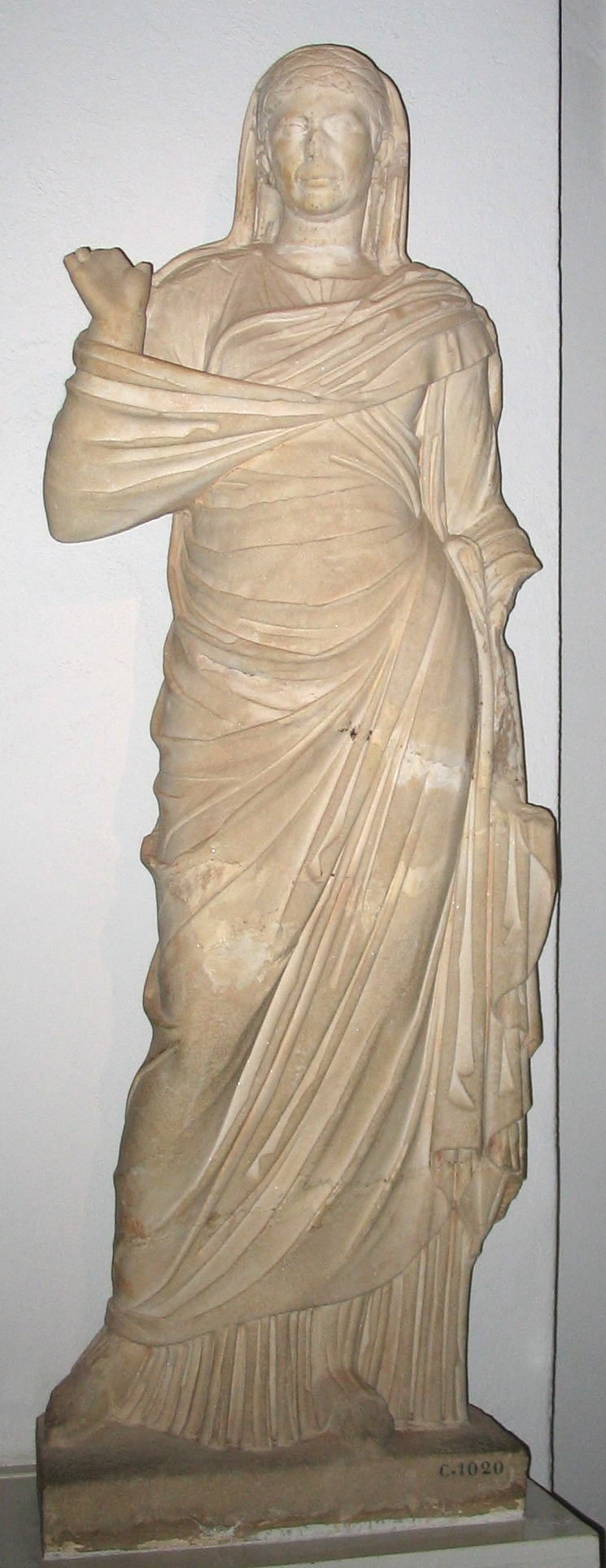
Minia Procula, Roman sculpture. CE 2nd century.

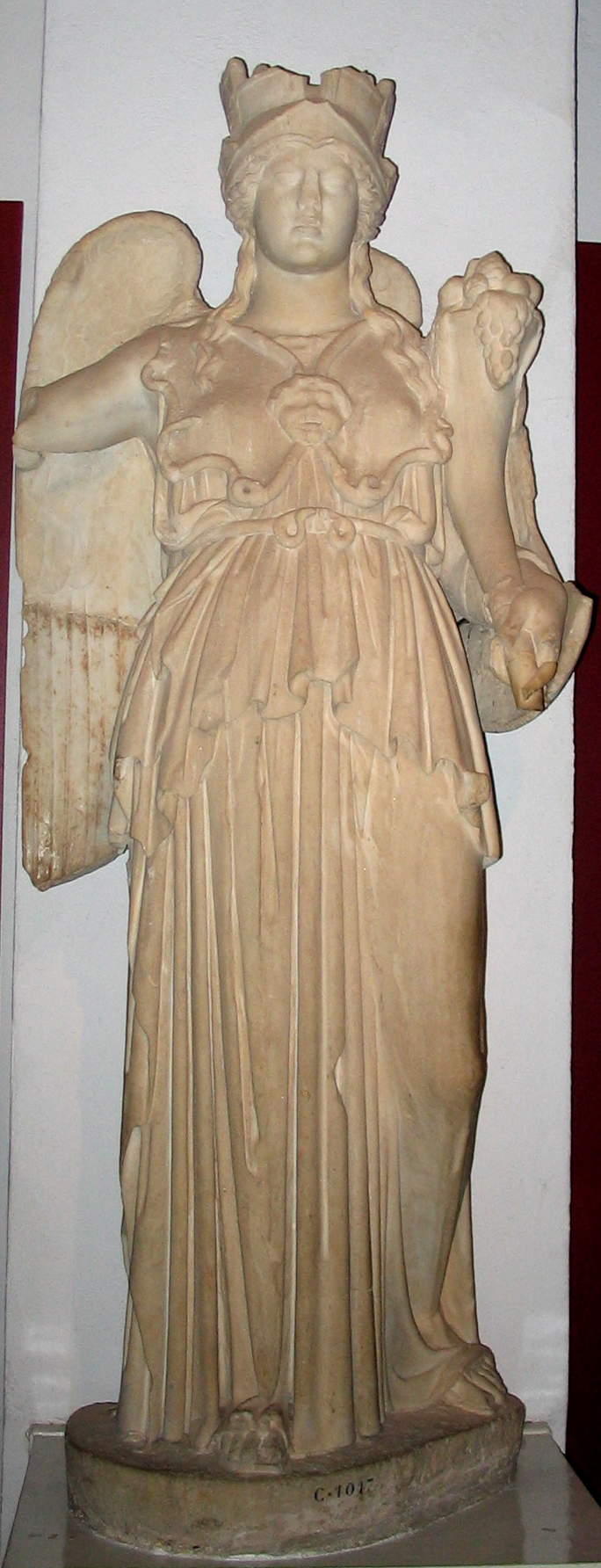
Roman sculpture of Minerva. CE 2nd century

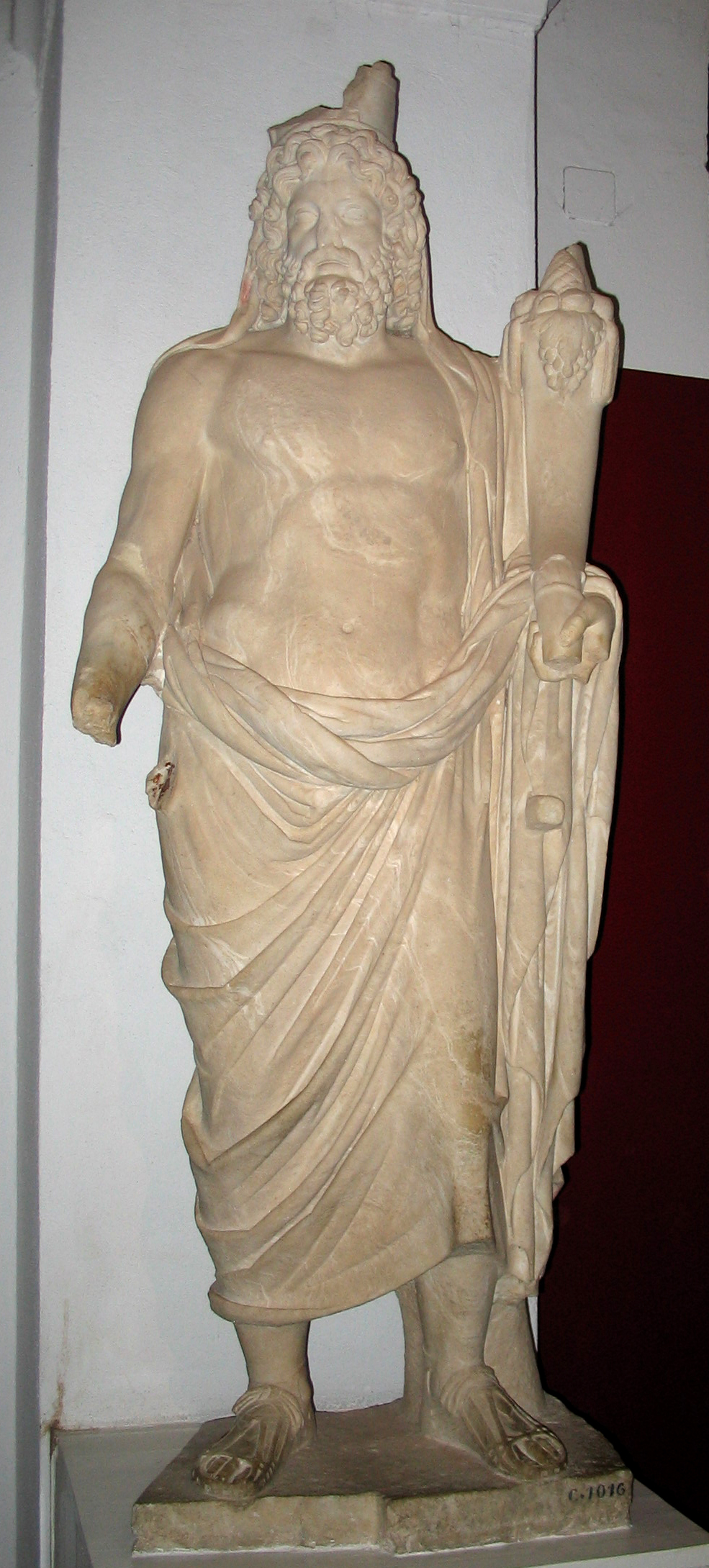
Roman sculpture of Saturn. CE 2nd century

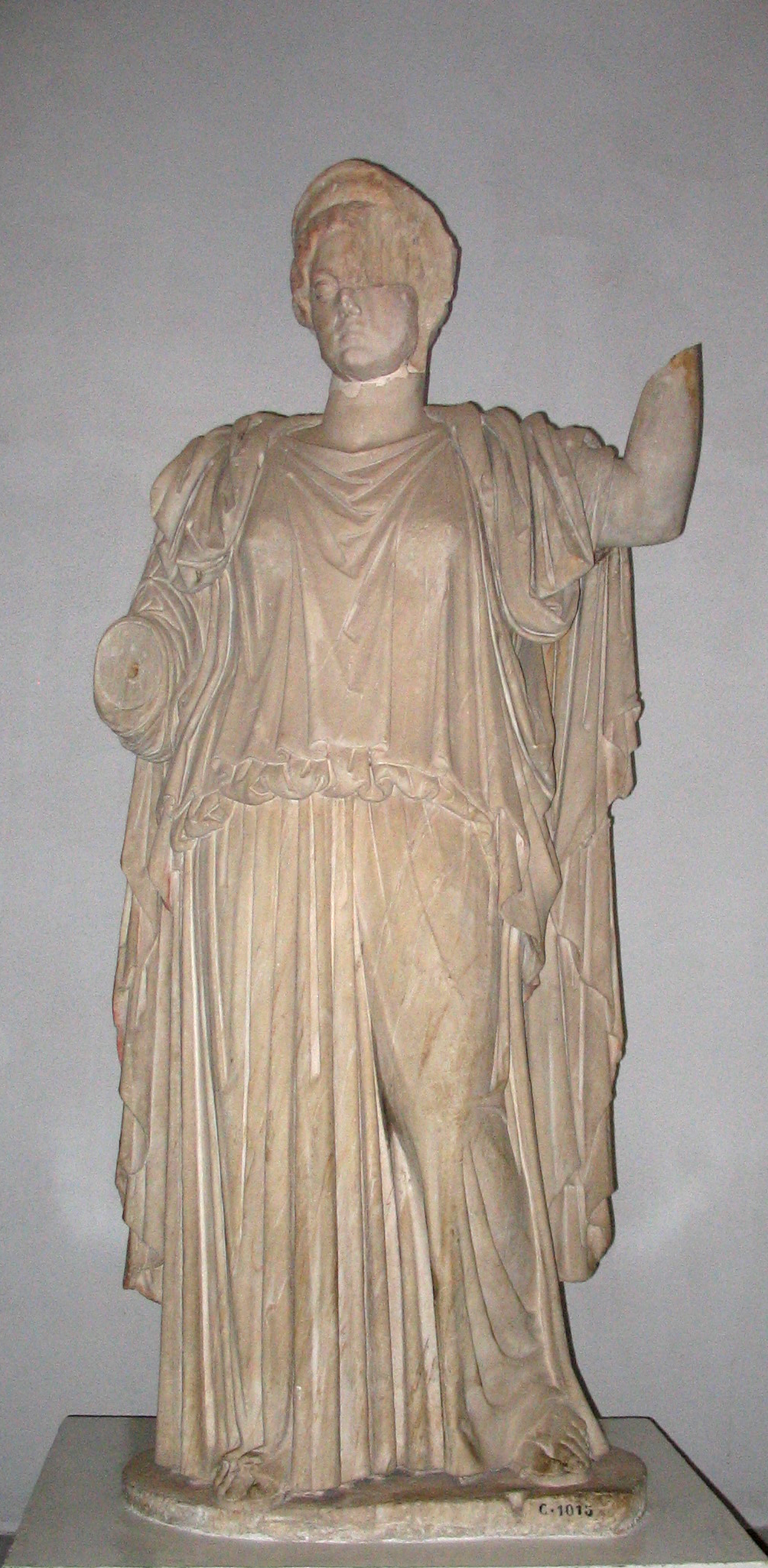
Roman sculpture of Ceres Diademea, CE 2nd century

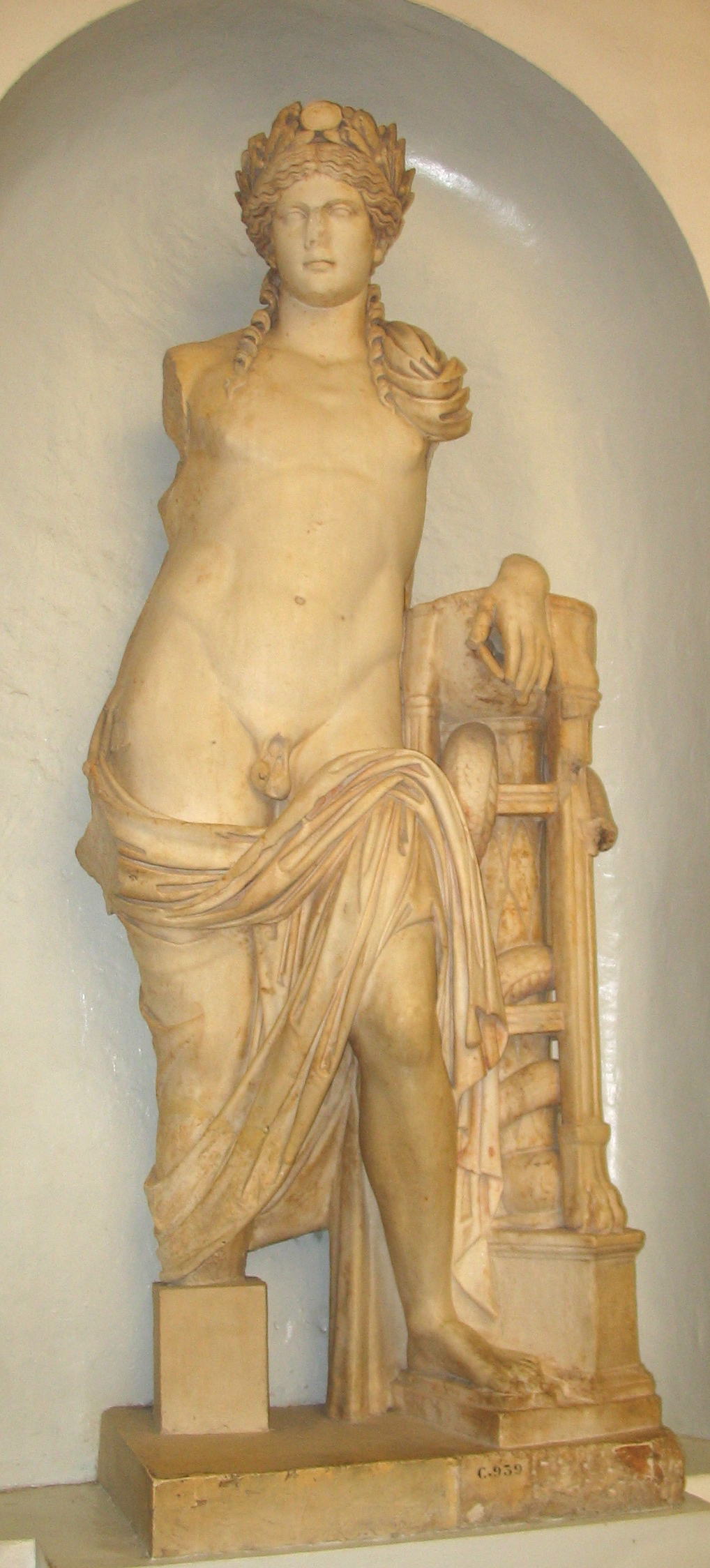
Roman sculpture of Apollo leaning on the Delphic tripod. CE 2nd century

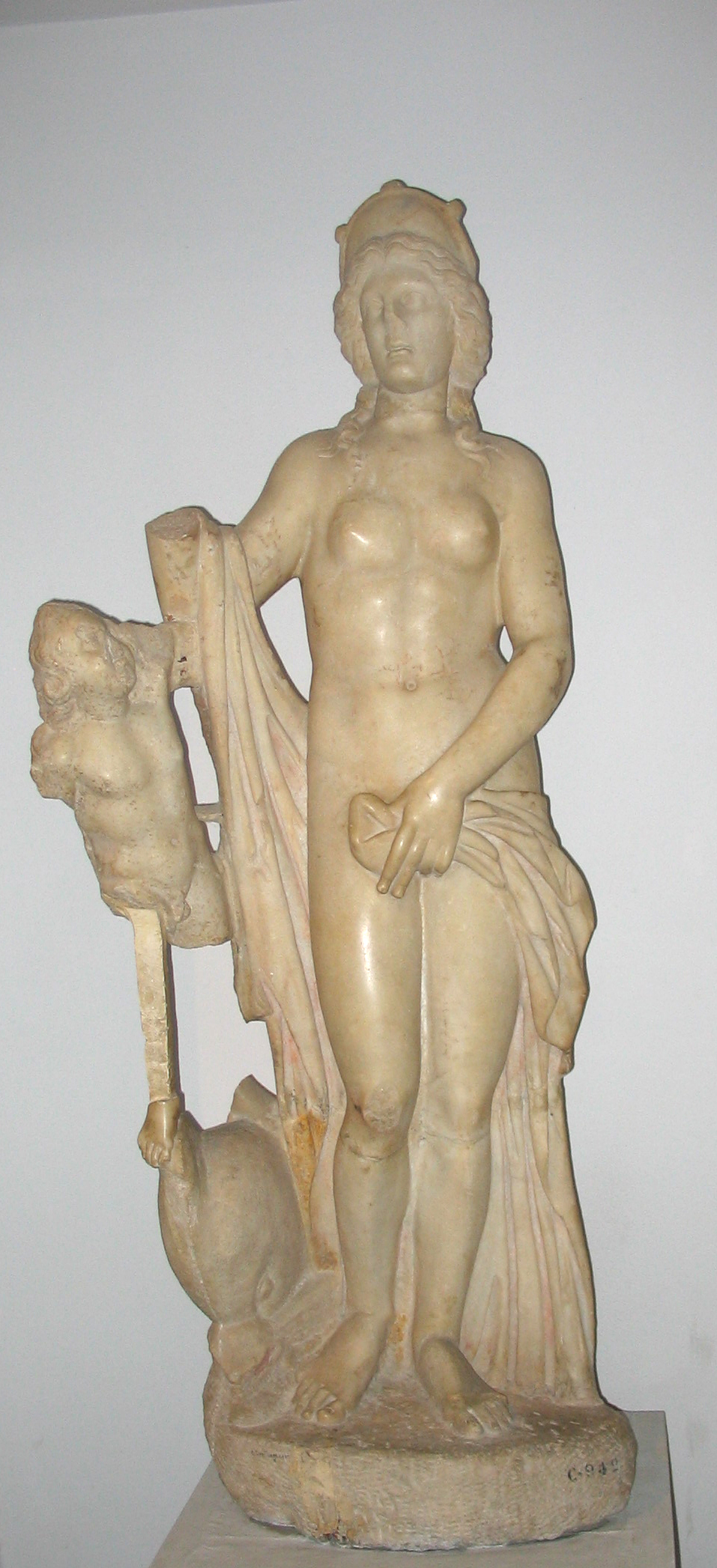
Venus and Eros, Roman sculpture of Venus and Eros, CR 2nd century

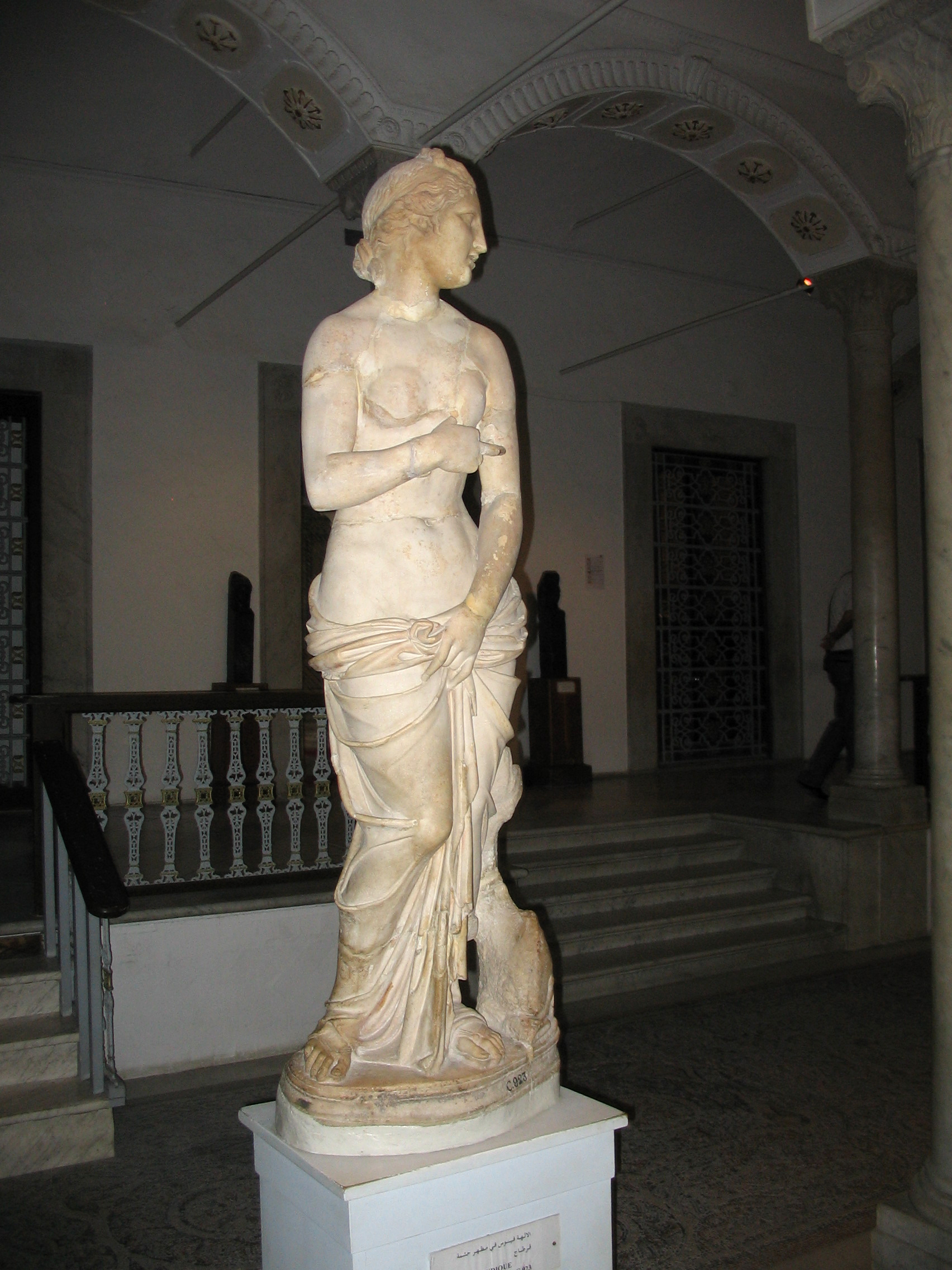
Sculpture of Venus Pudica, CE 2nd century

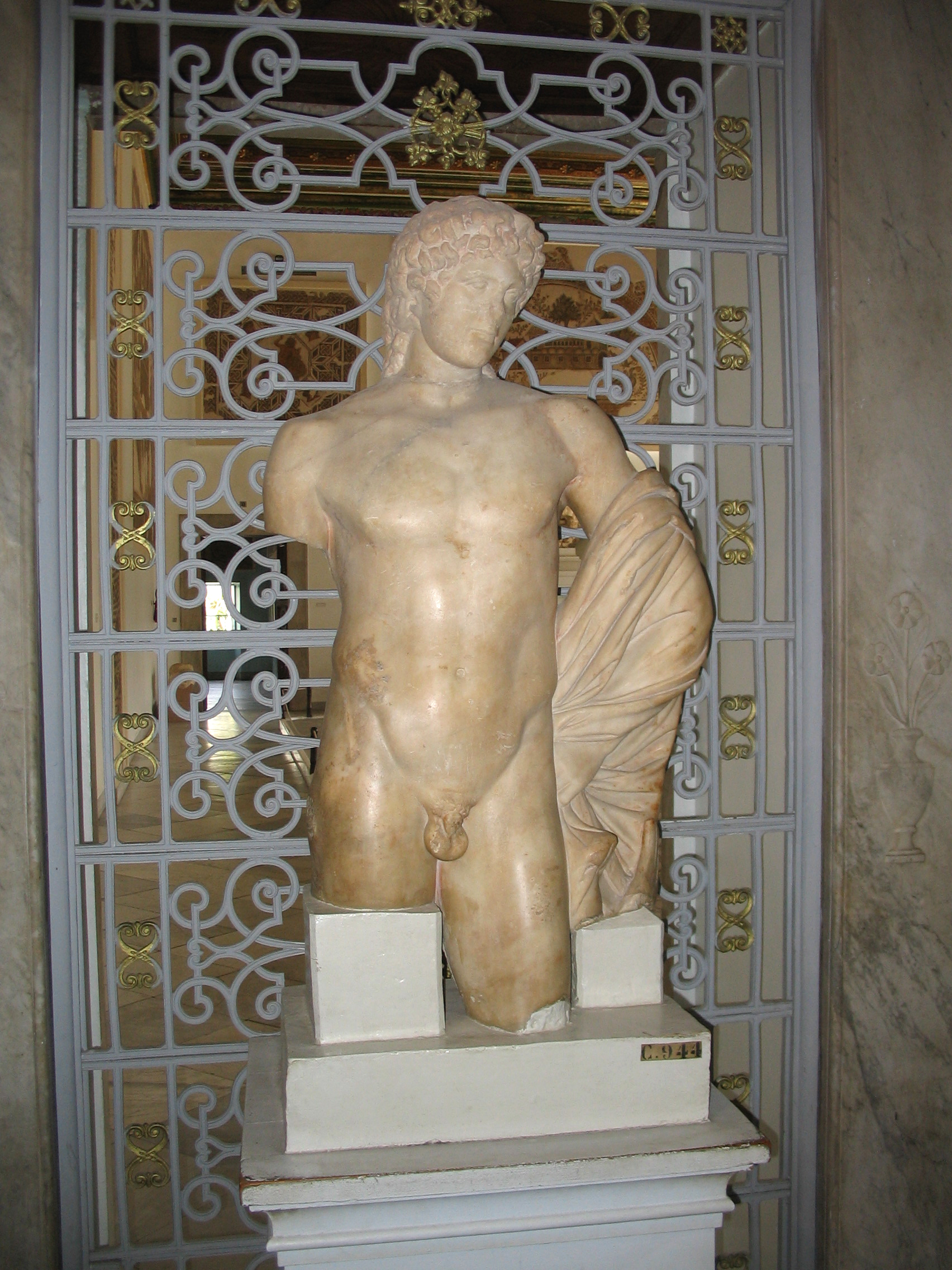
Sculpture of Ganymede, CE 2nd century

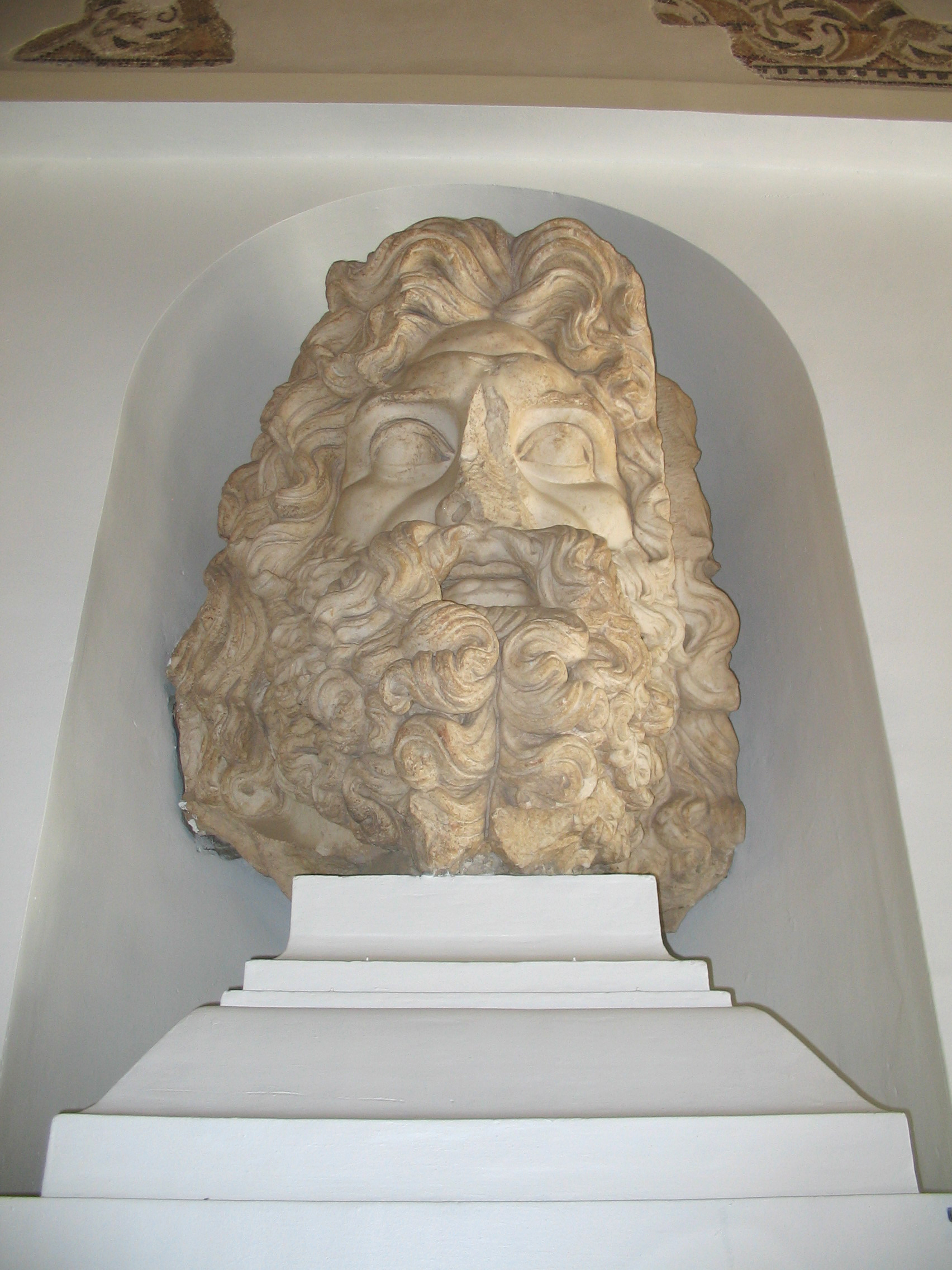
Colossal head, Sculpture of Jupiter, CE 3rd century

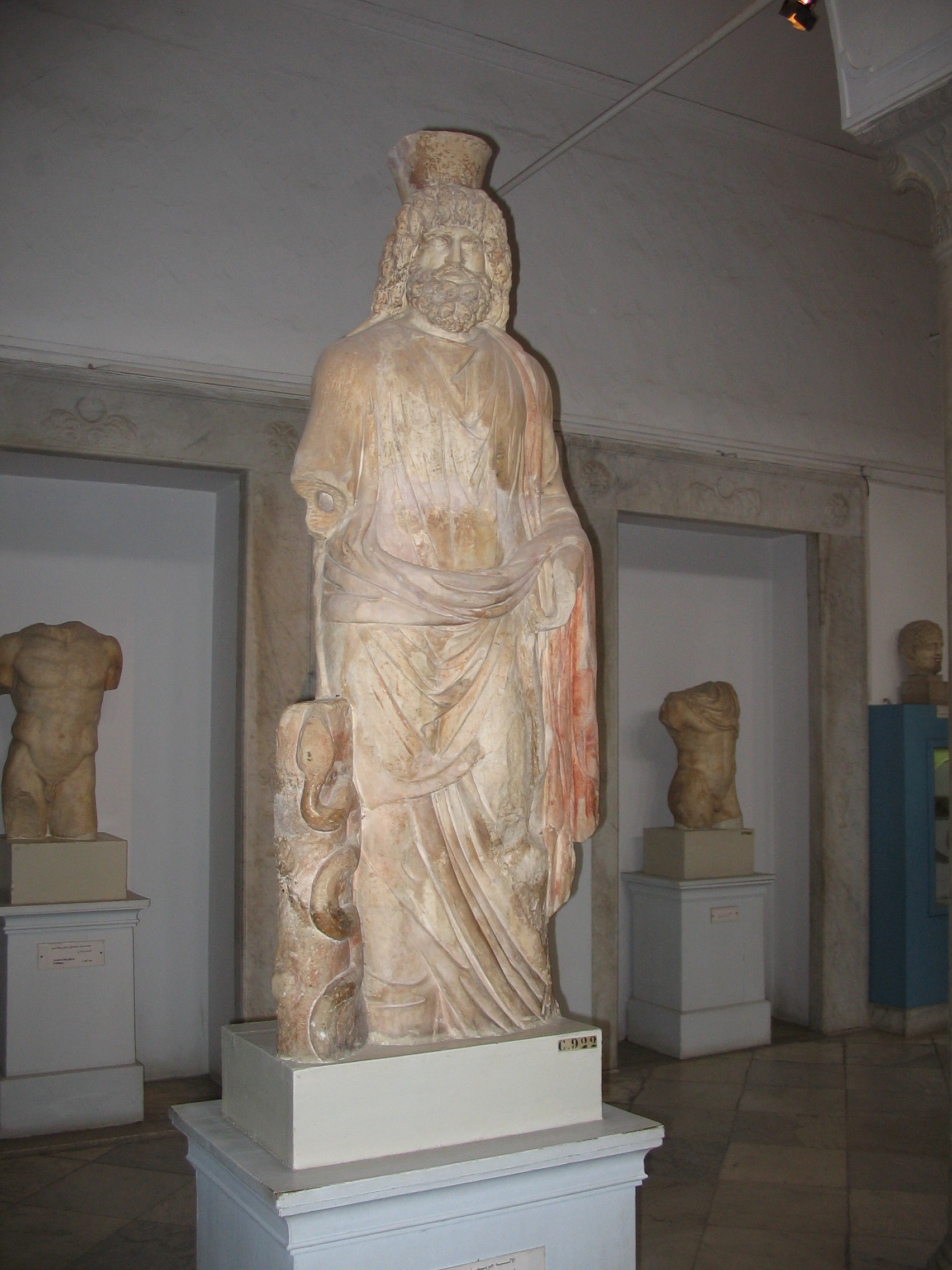
Jupiter Serapio, CE 2nd century

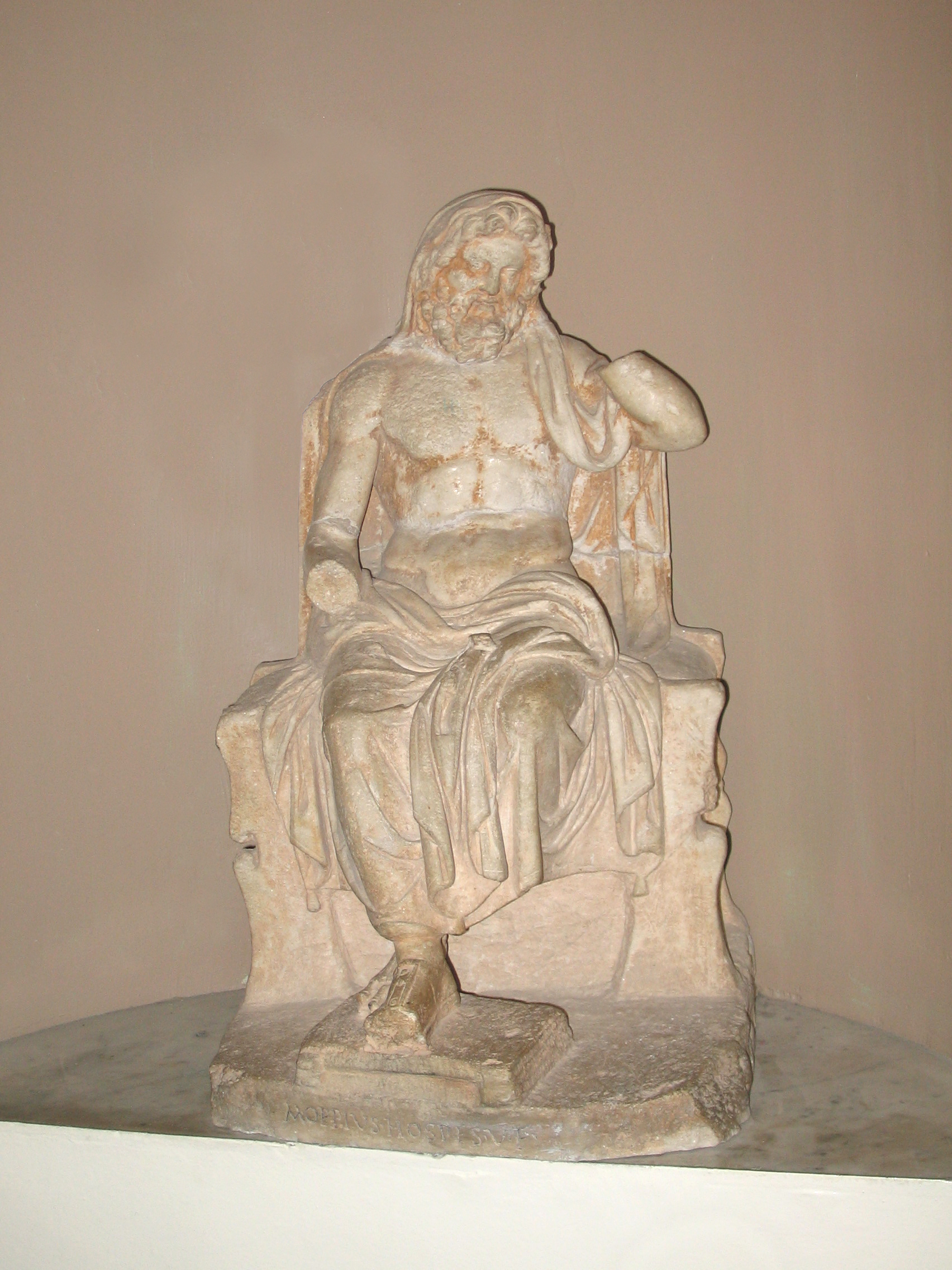
Sculpture of Jupiter, CE 2nd century

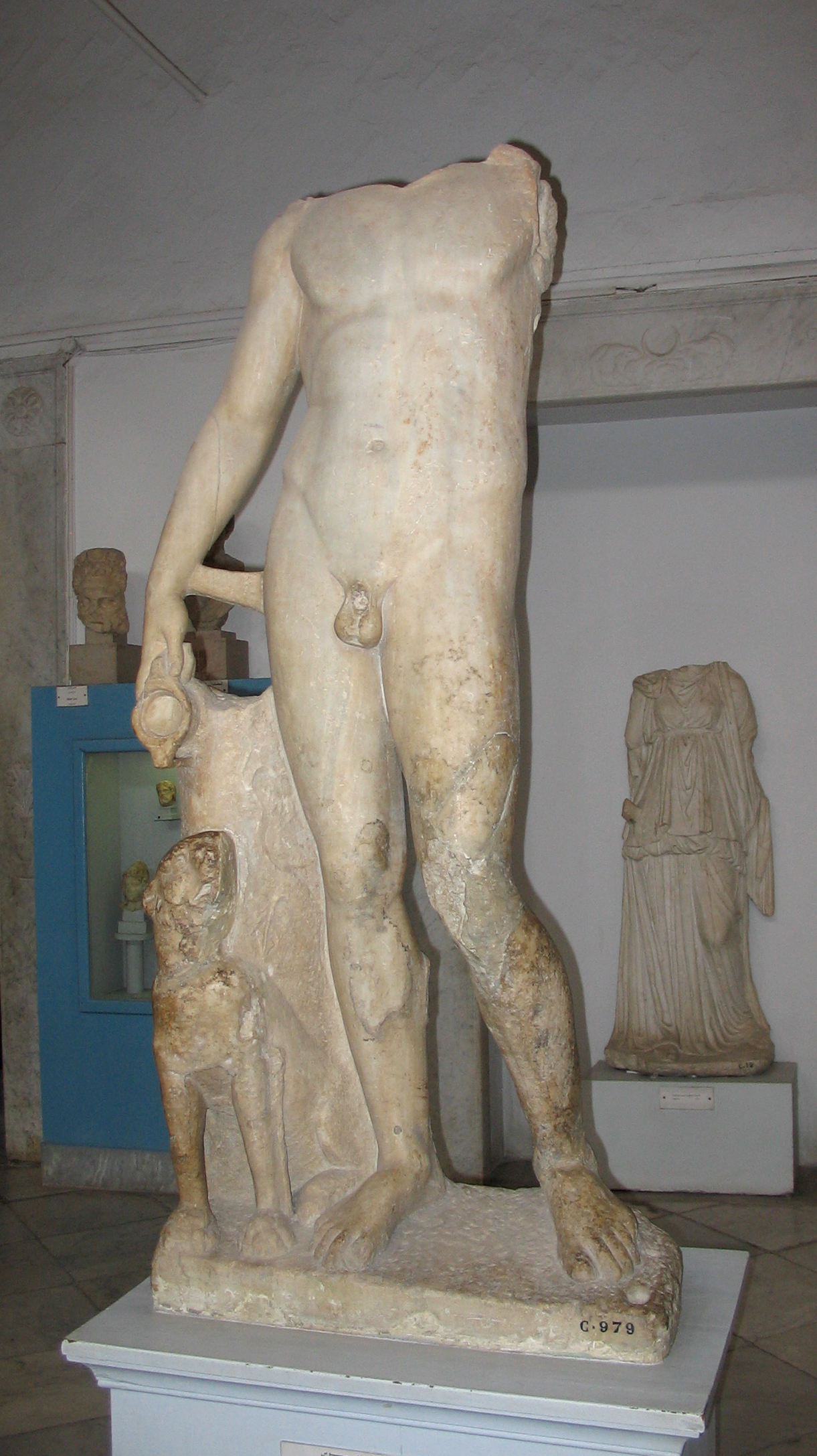
Sculpture of Bacchus, CE 2nd century

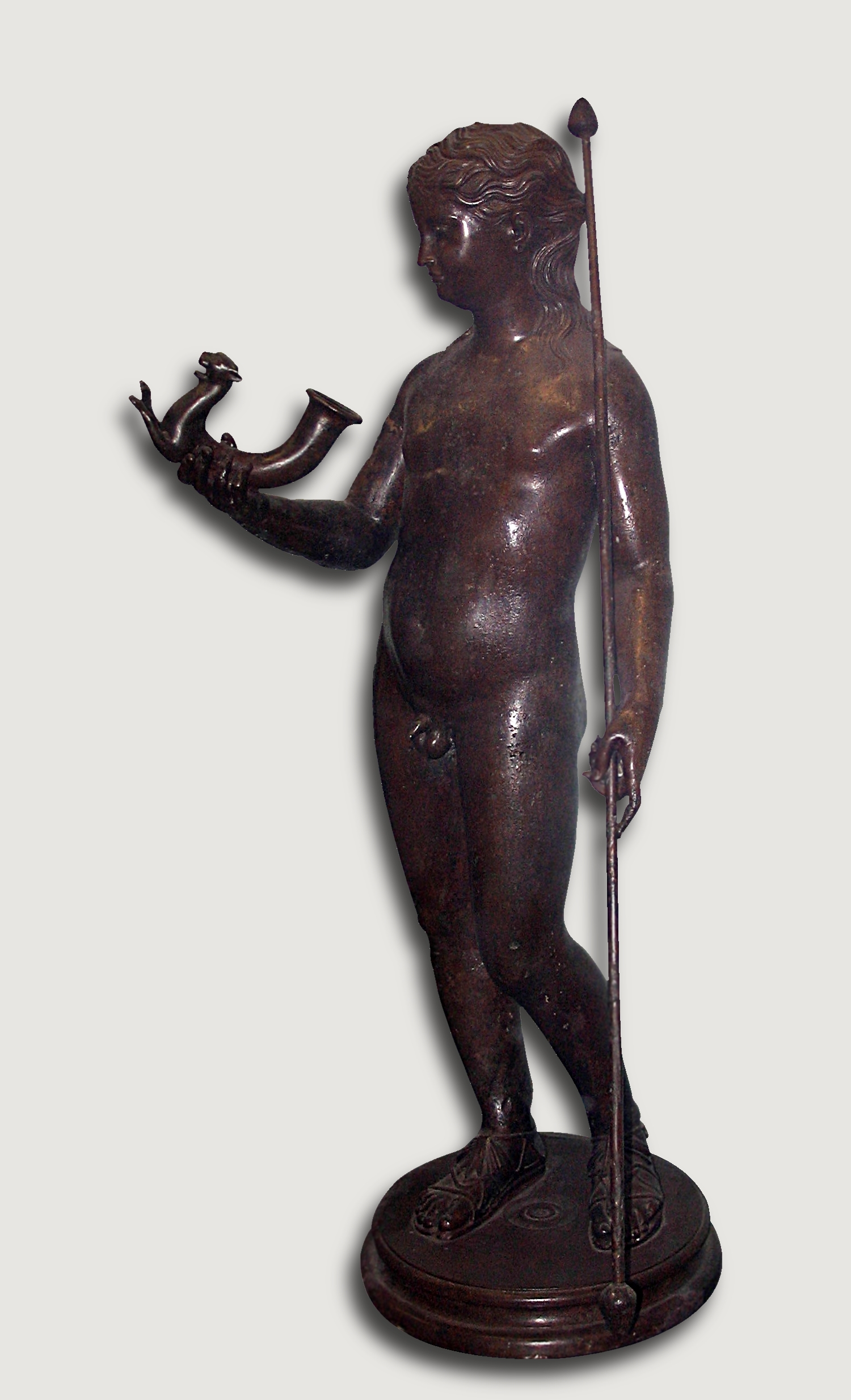
Sculpture of Dionysus as a child, CE 2nd century

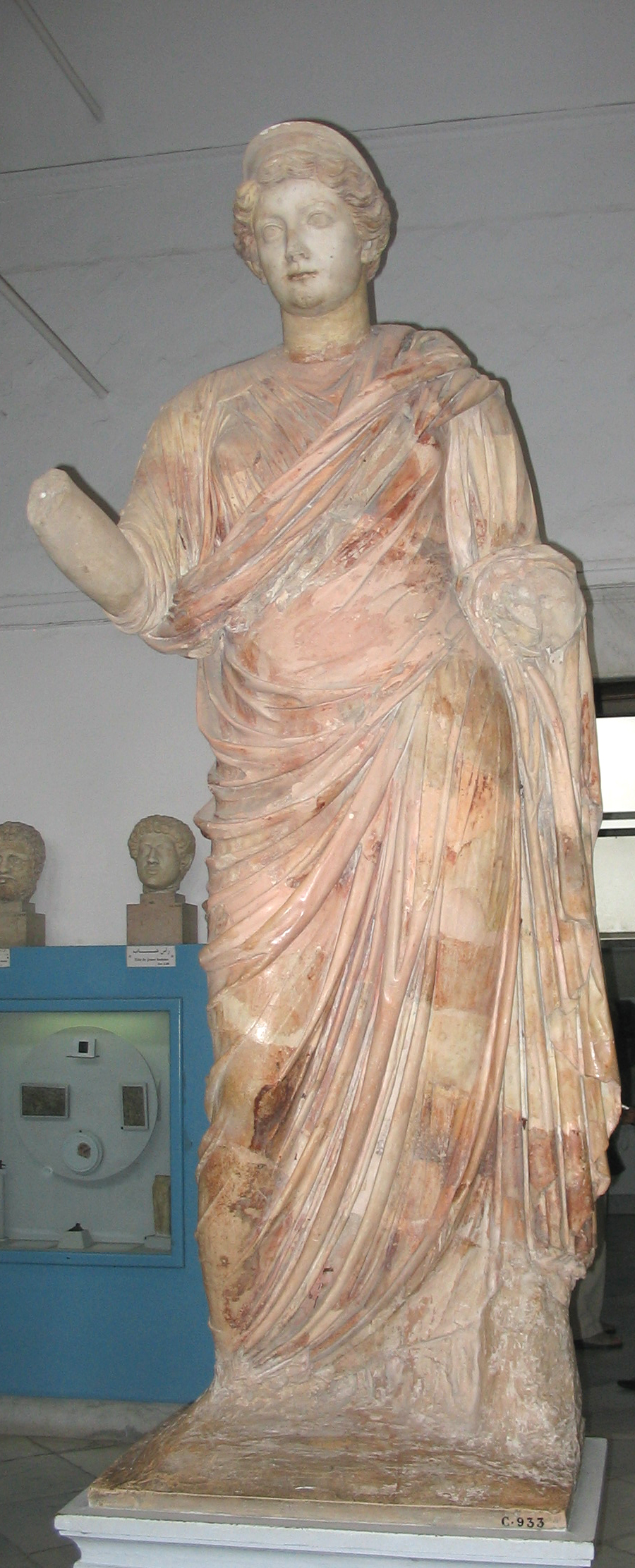
Sculpture of Empress Faustina II statue, CE 2nd century

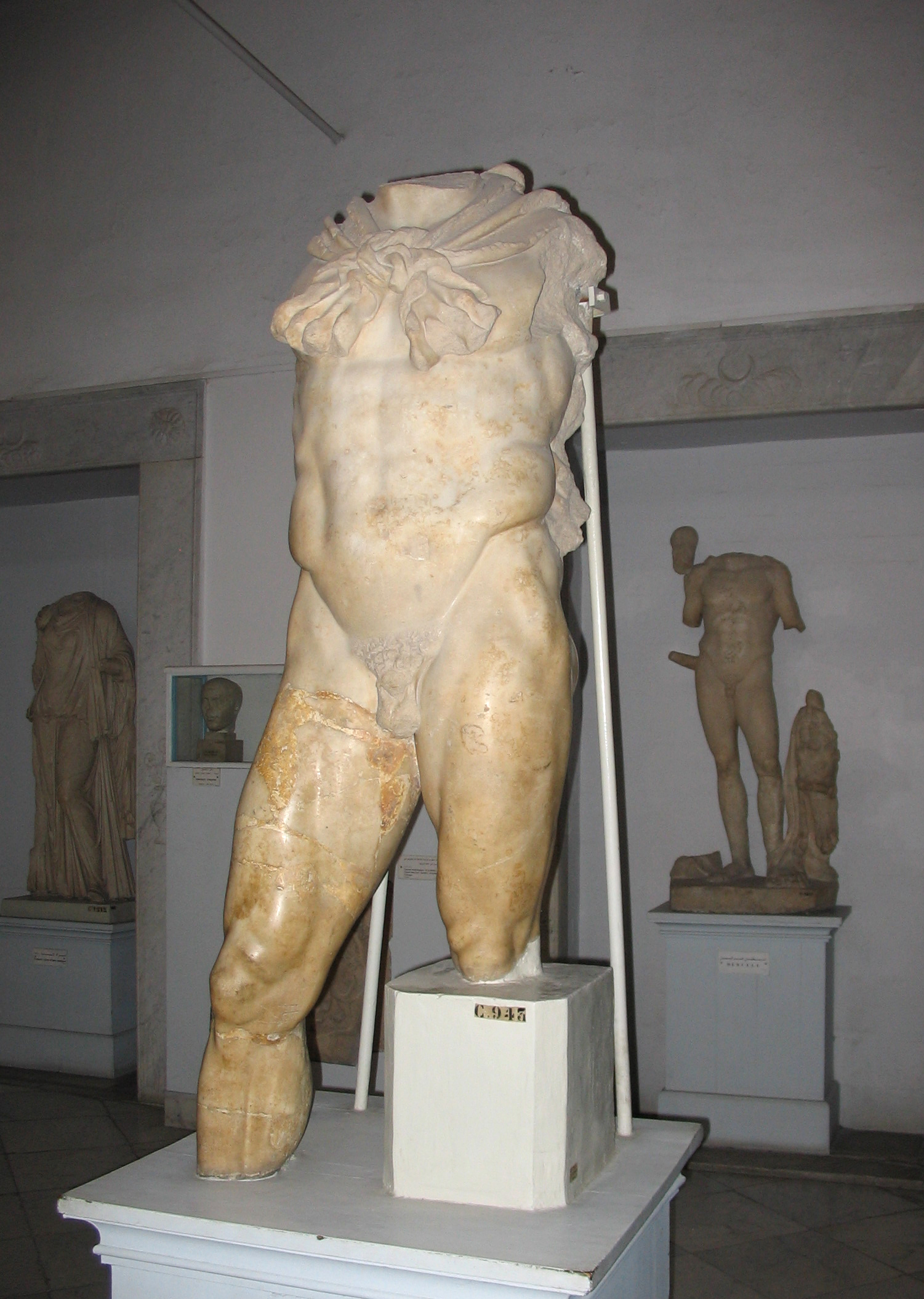
Sculpture of Hercules, CE 2nd century

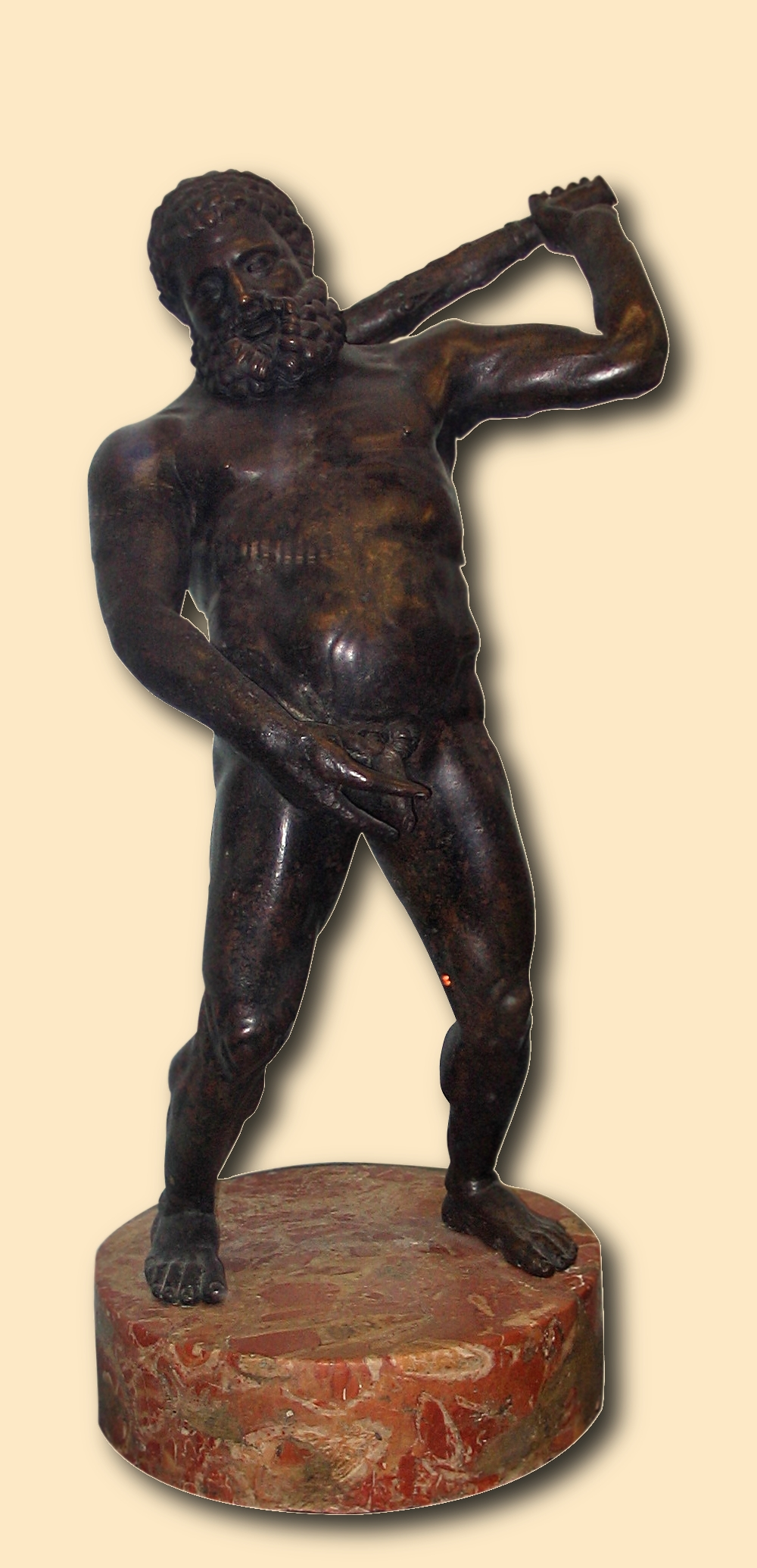
Sculpture of Drunken Hercules, CE 2nd century

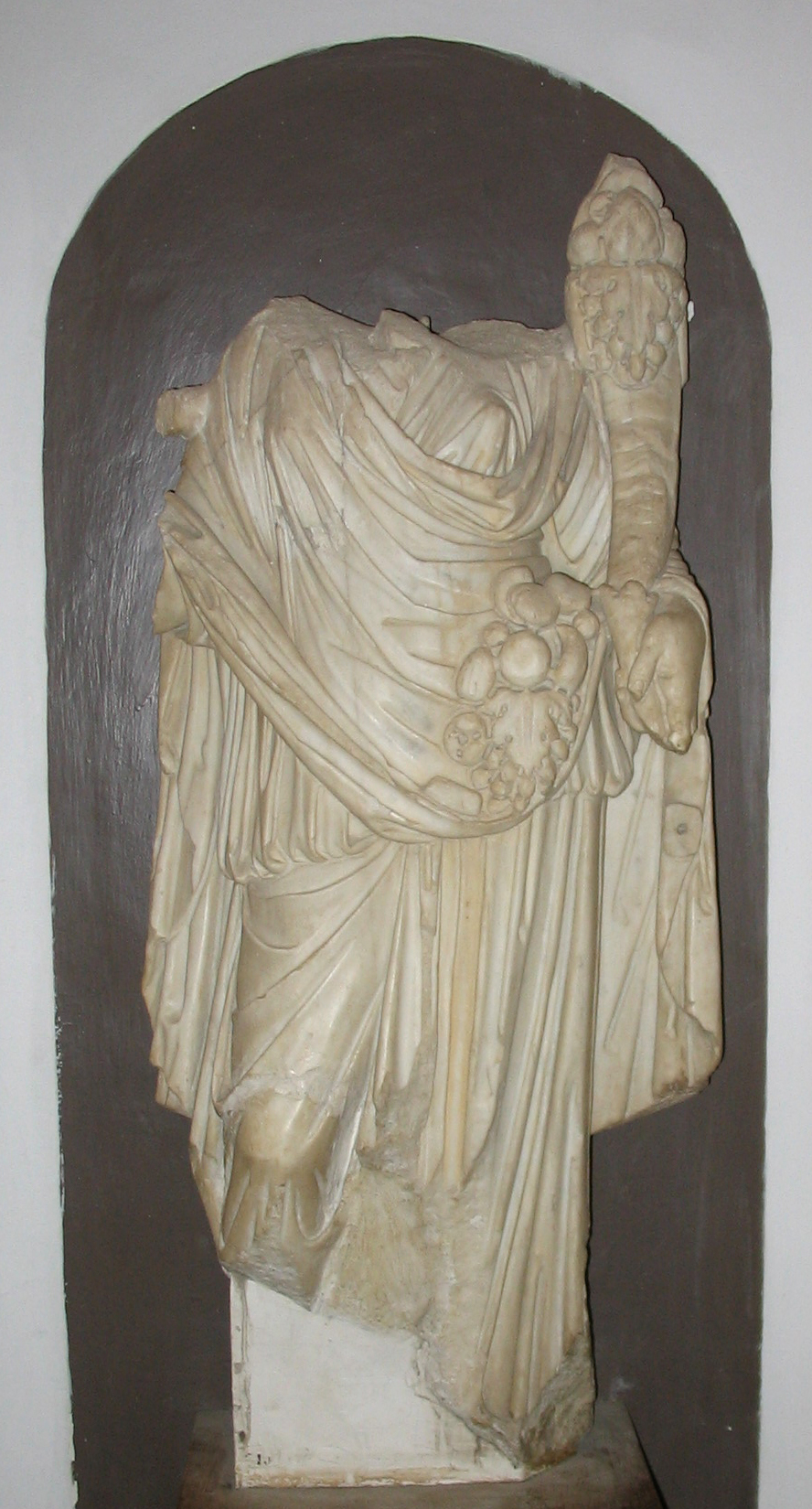
Sculpture of Abundance, CE 3rd century

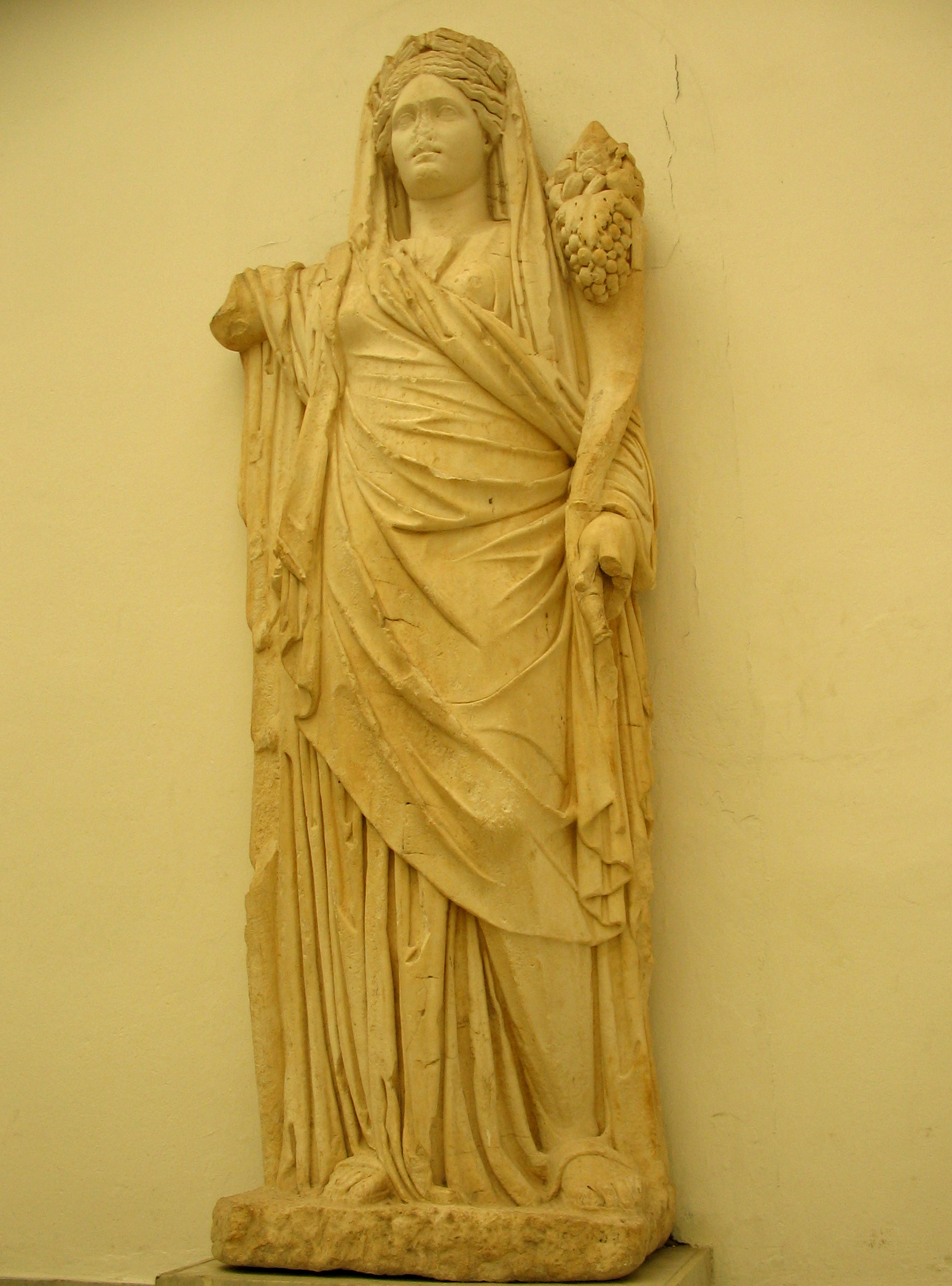
Sculpture of Concordia Pantea, CE 2nd century

=== "Pieces in the ground floor" ===
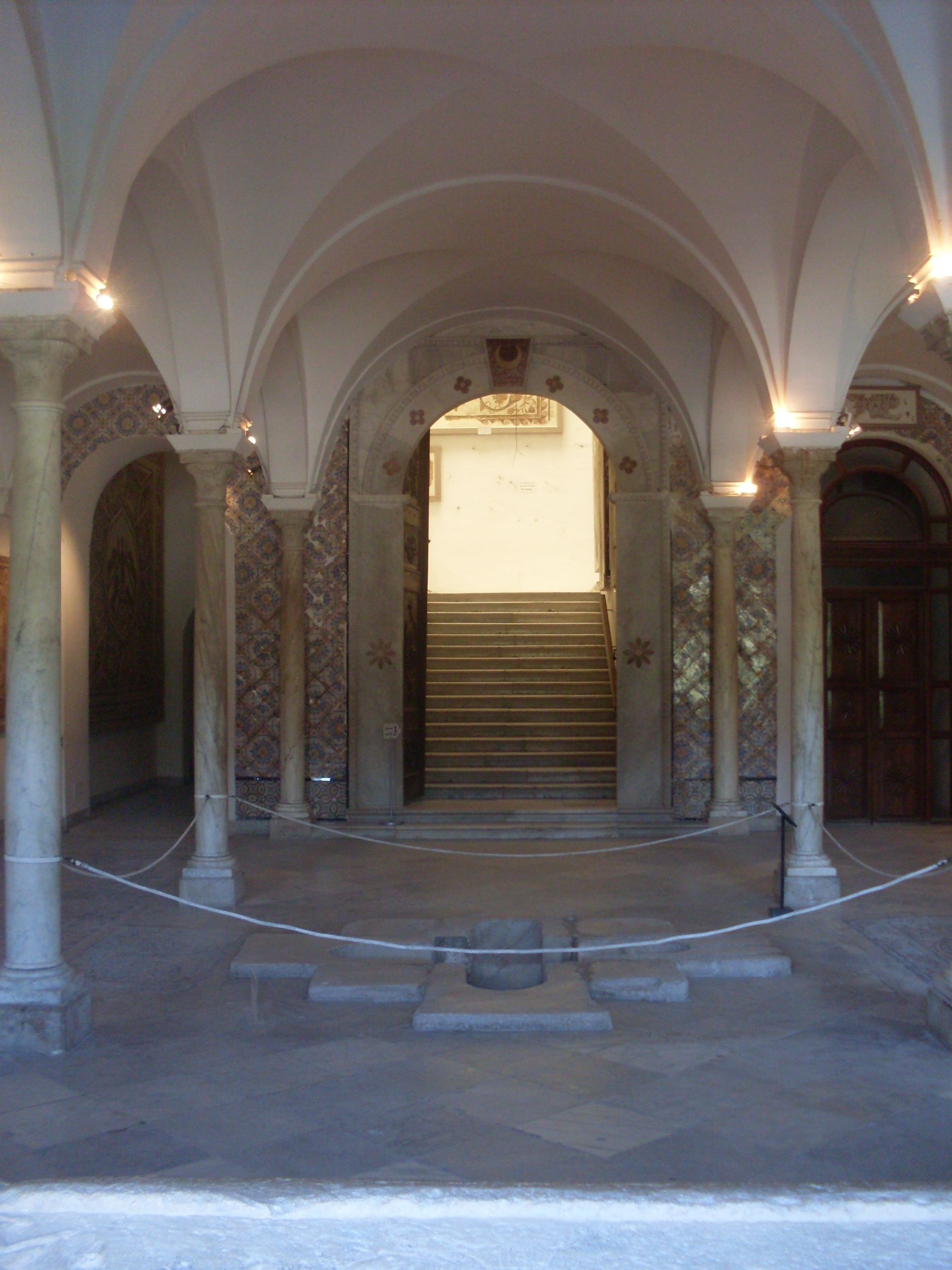
The early Christian room with baptistery in the centre

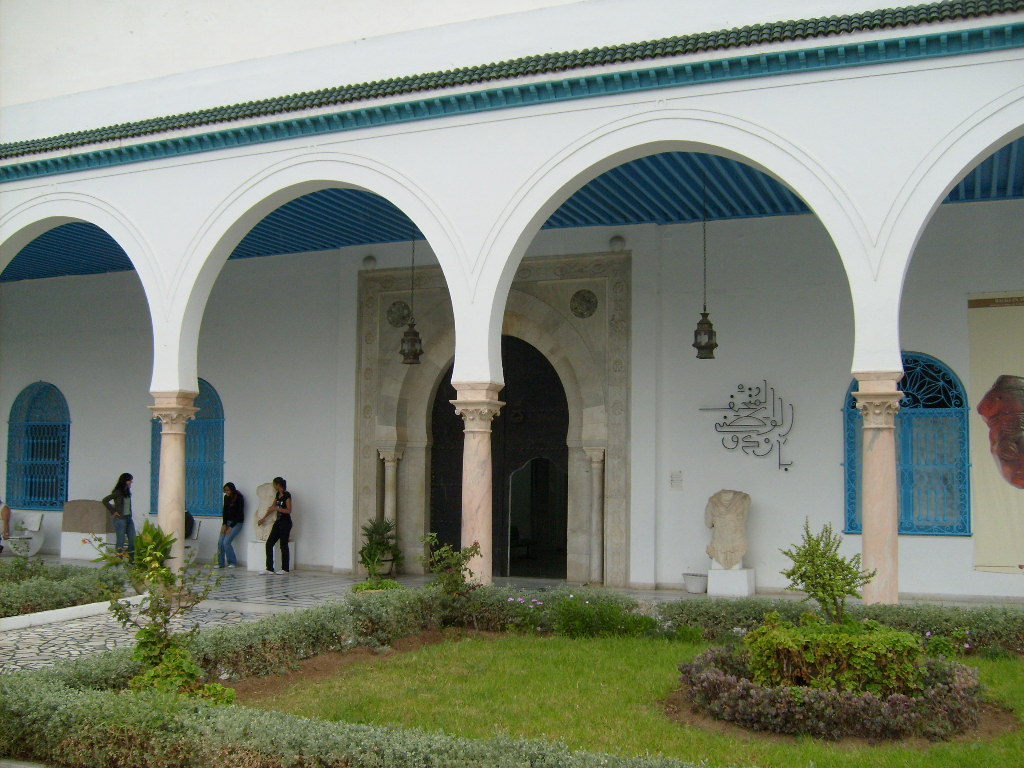
Museum entrance

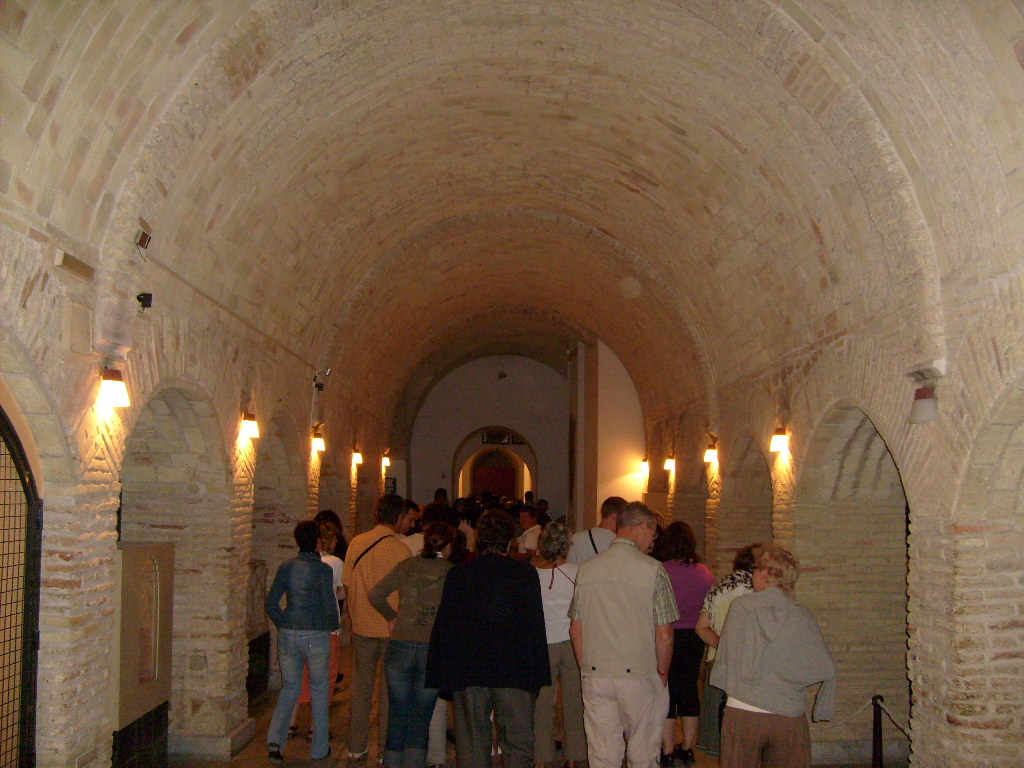
Hallway of sarcophagi full with visitors.

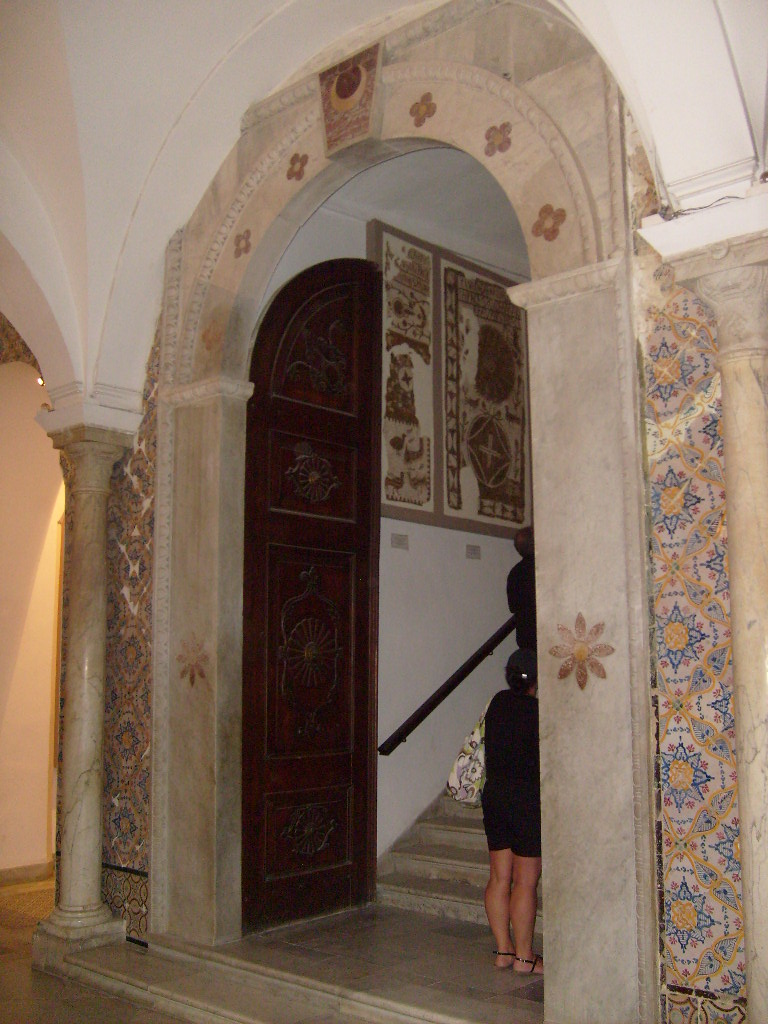
Access door on the first floor

=== "Fresco and Roof of Althiburos Room" ===
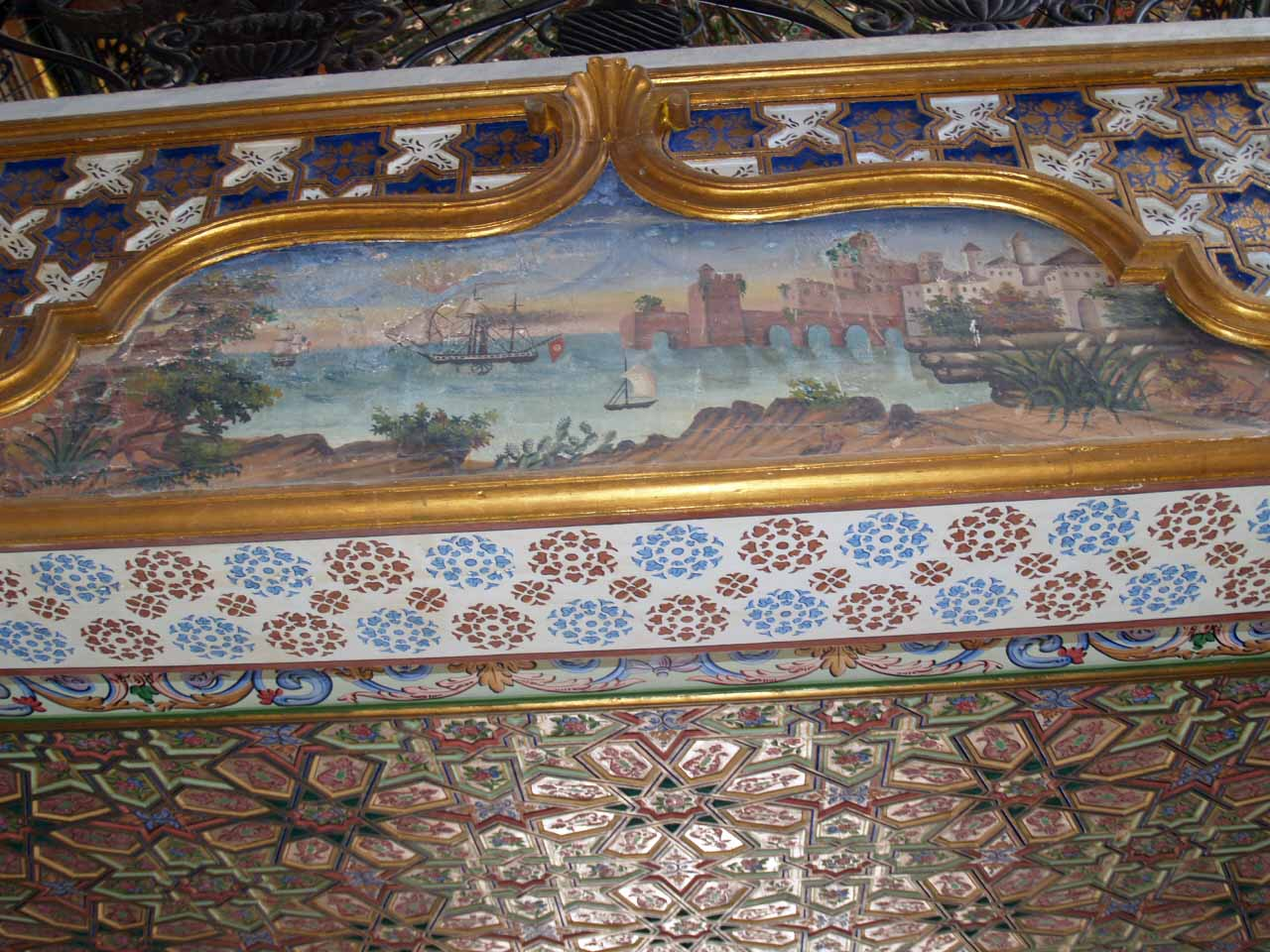
Fresco on interior balcony

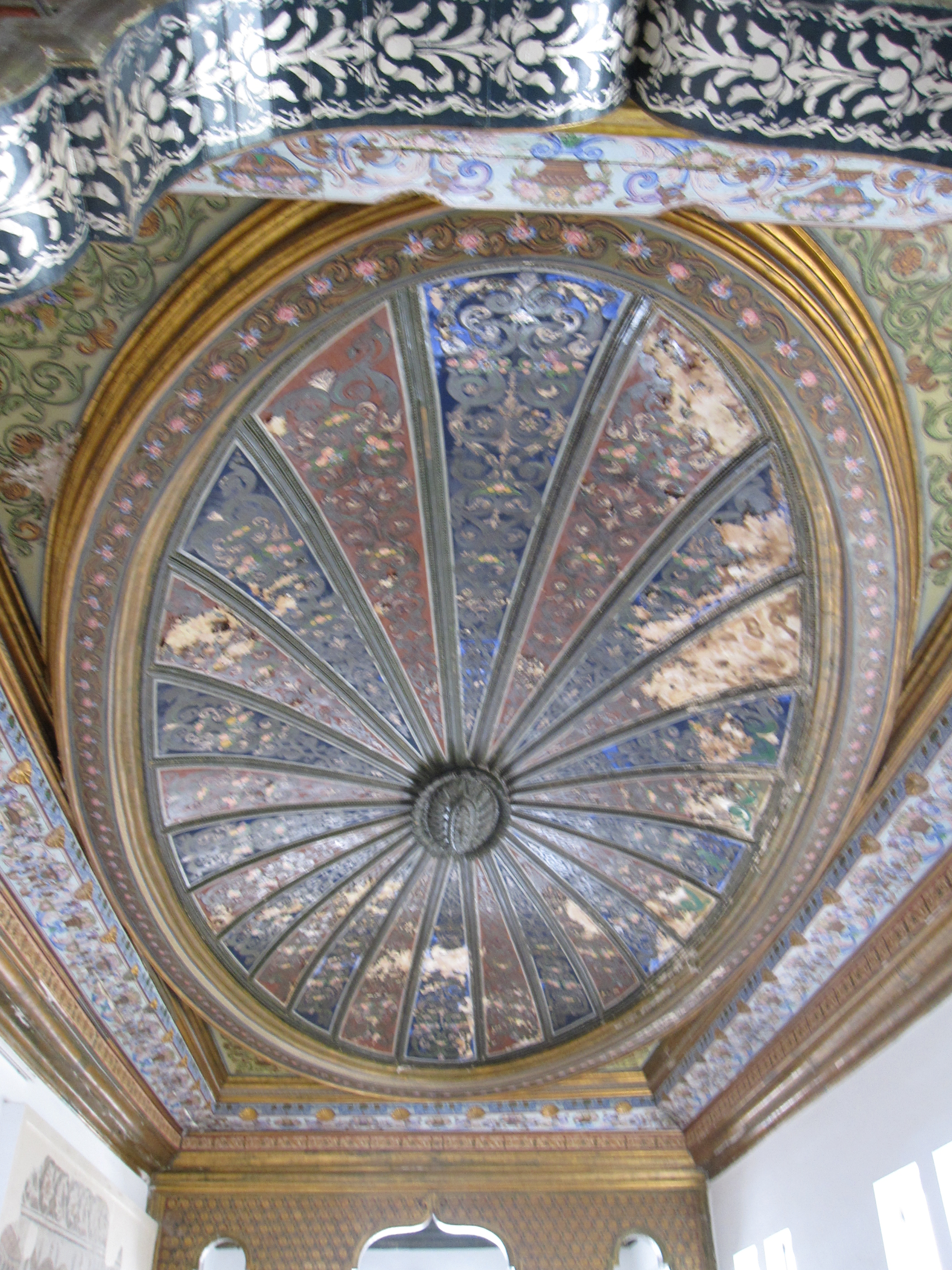
Roof of the Bey Palace

=== "Roofs of Oudna Room" ===
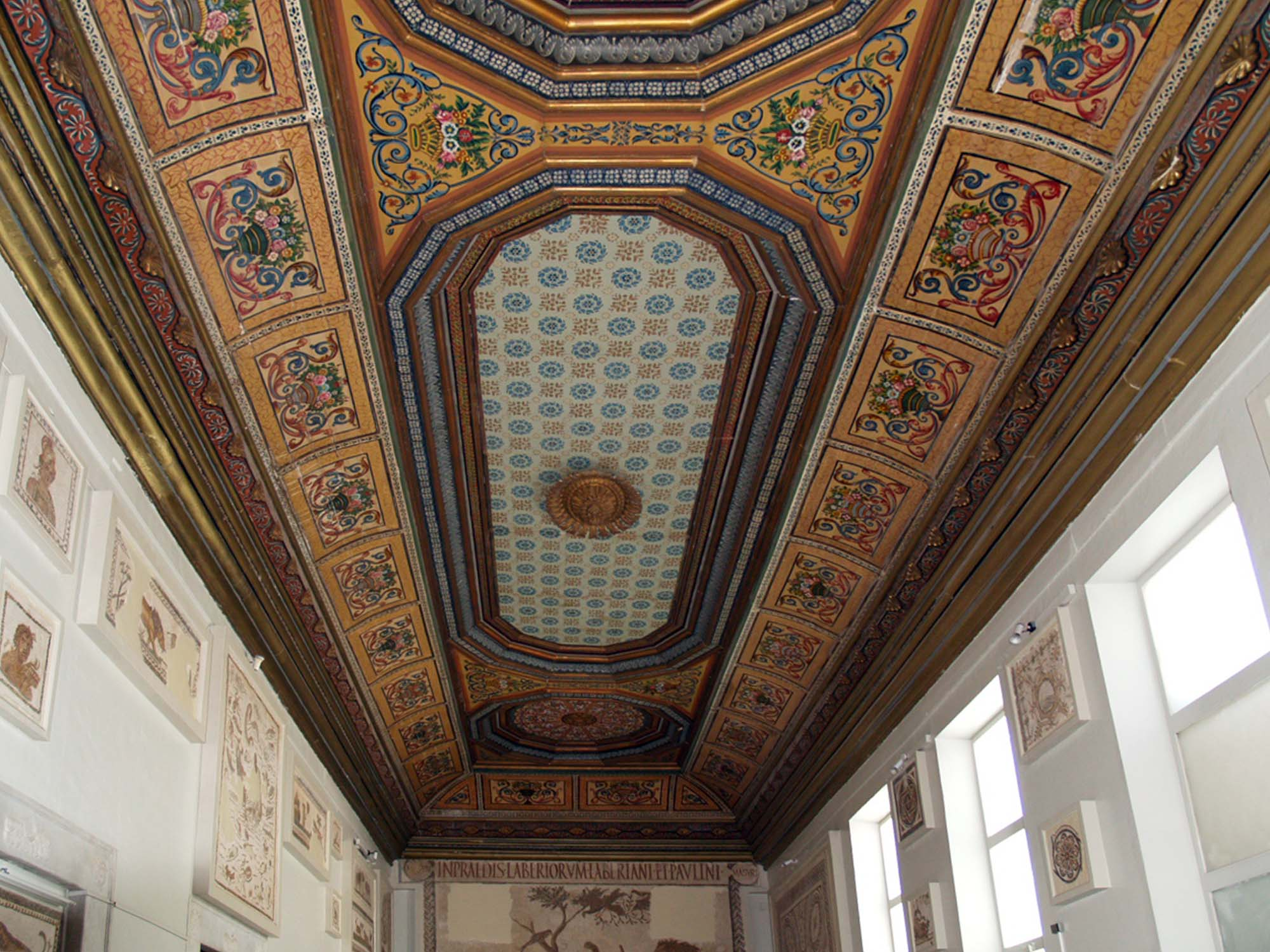
Painted ceiling of the Oudna Room.

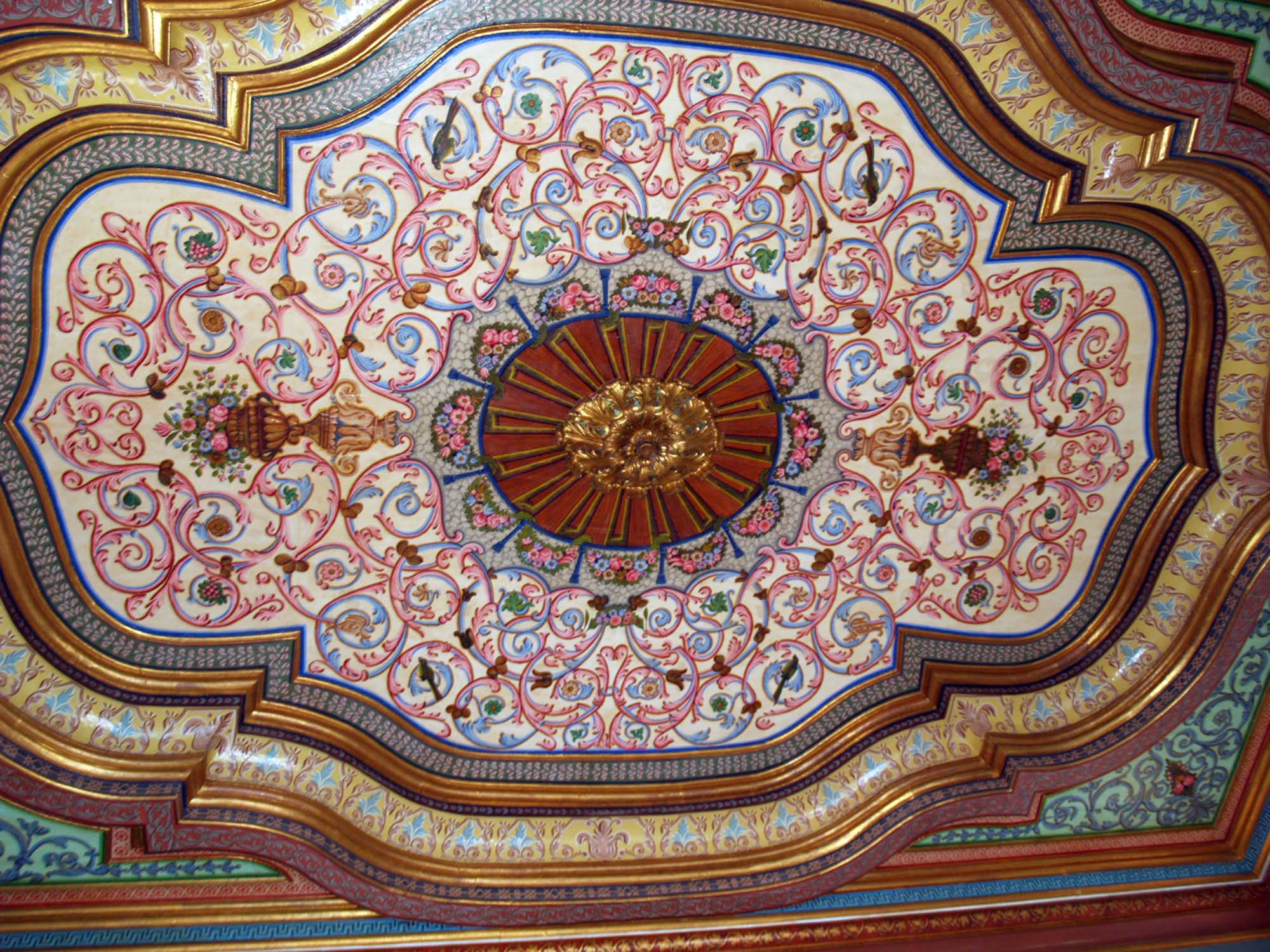
Painted wooden ceiling.

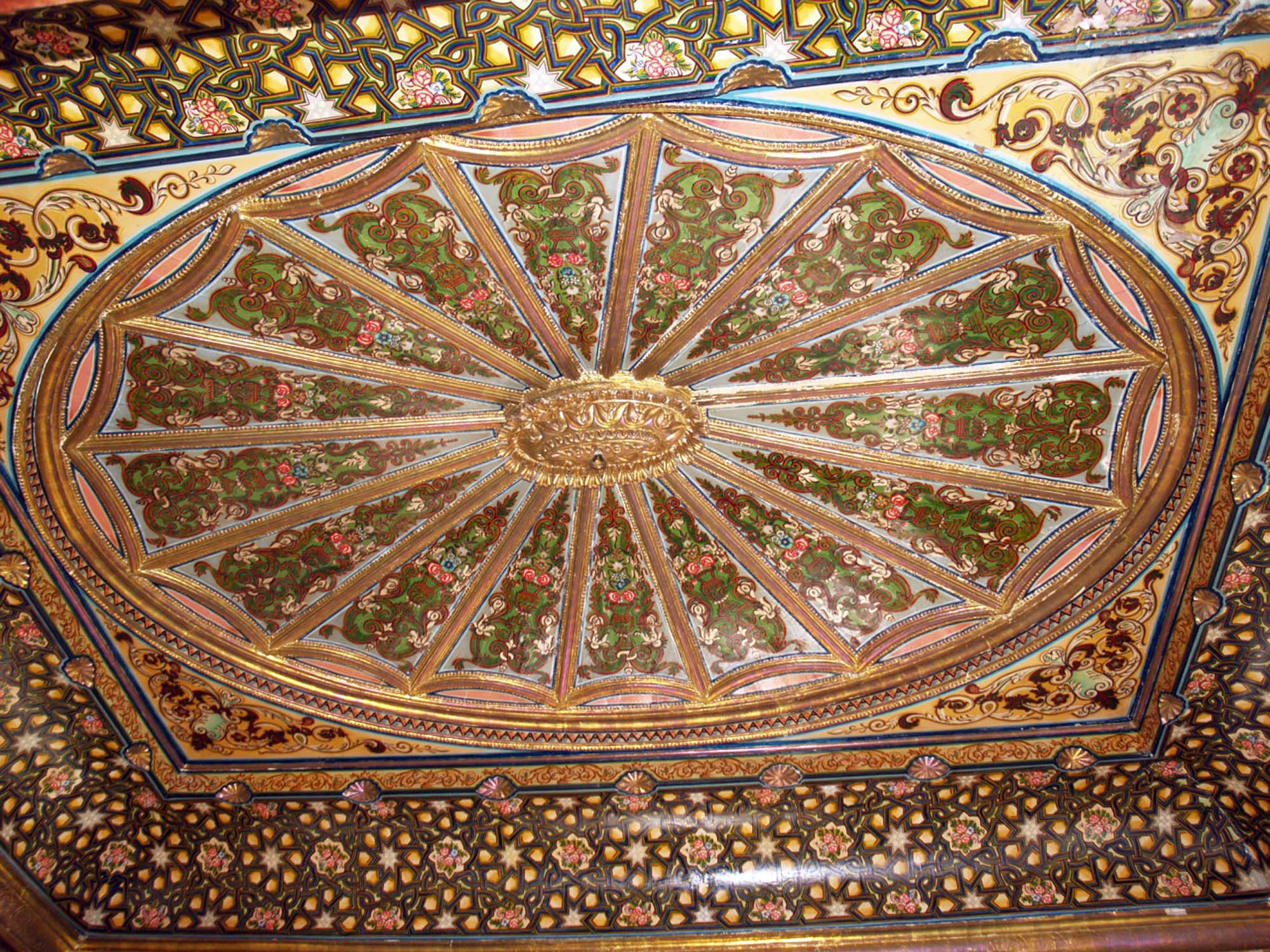
Painted and gilded ceiling of the Room Althiburos.

=== "Roofs of Sousse Room" ===
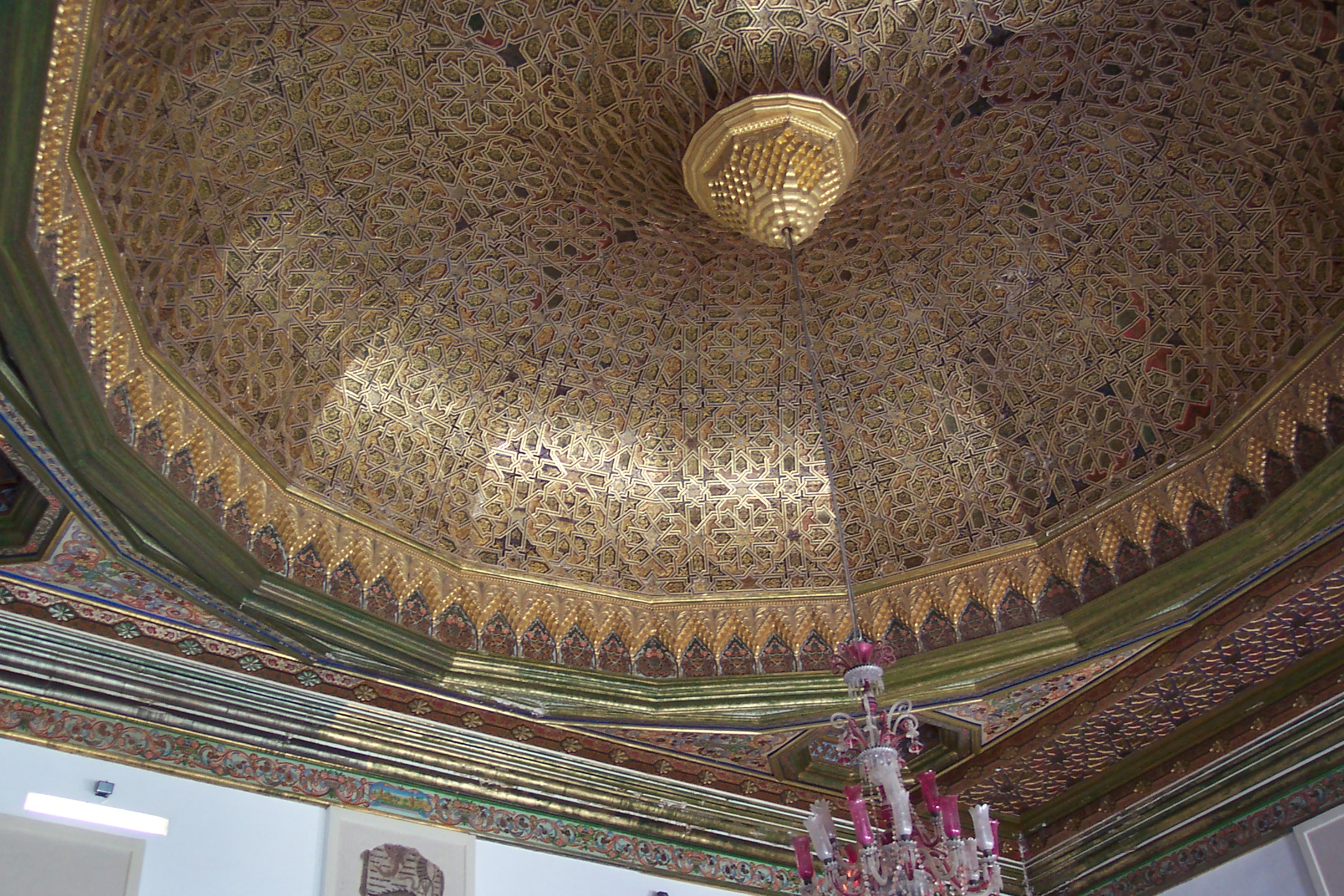
The domed ceiling of the mosaic hall

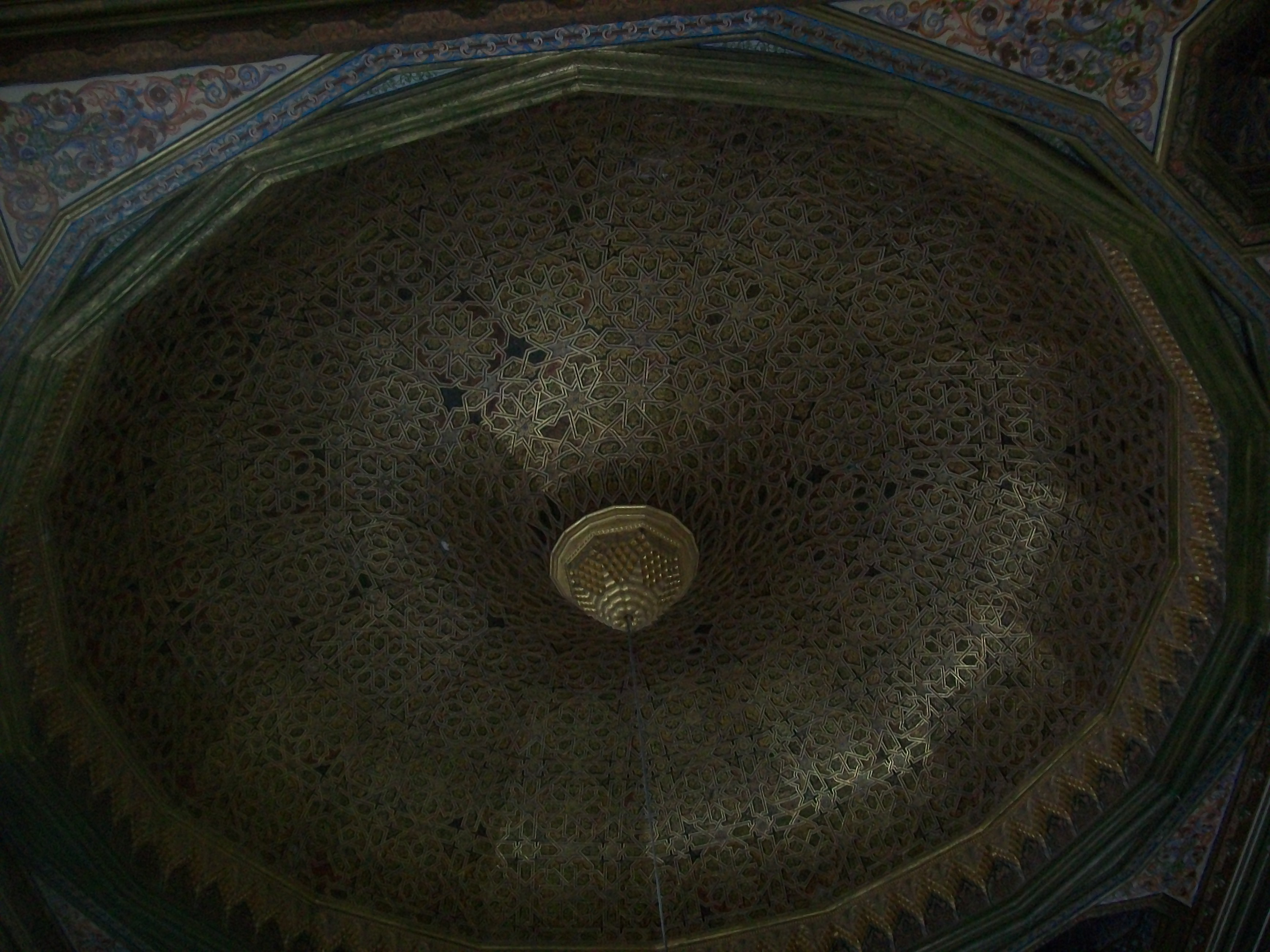
Parts of the Bardo Palace before CE 1870, Le Bardo

=== "Roofs of Virgil Room" ===
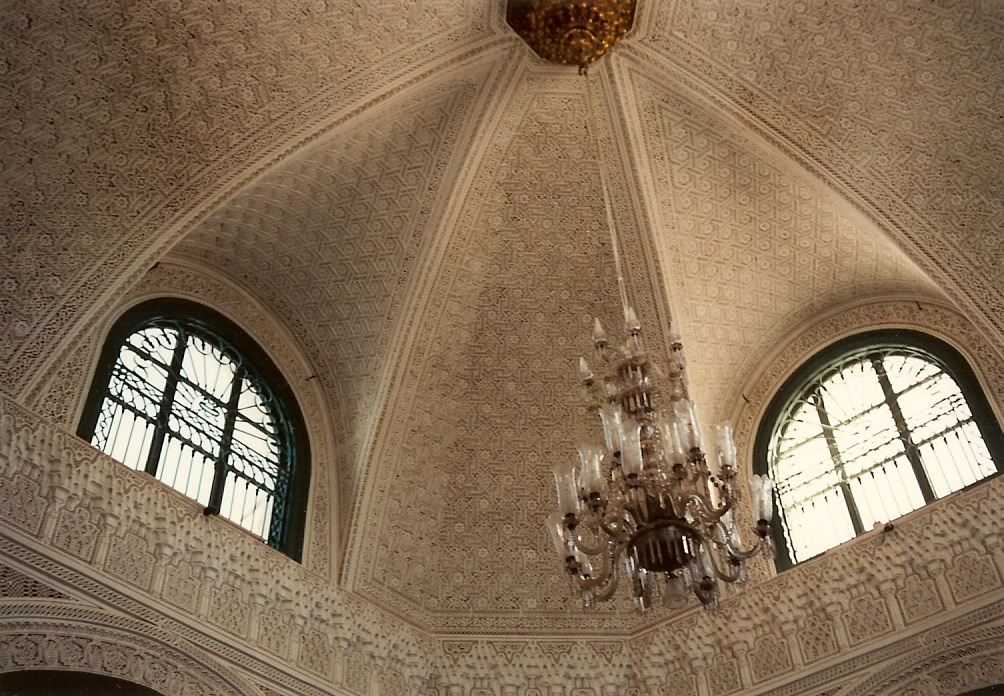
Roofs decorated with stucco

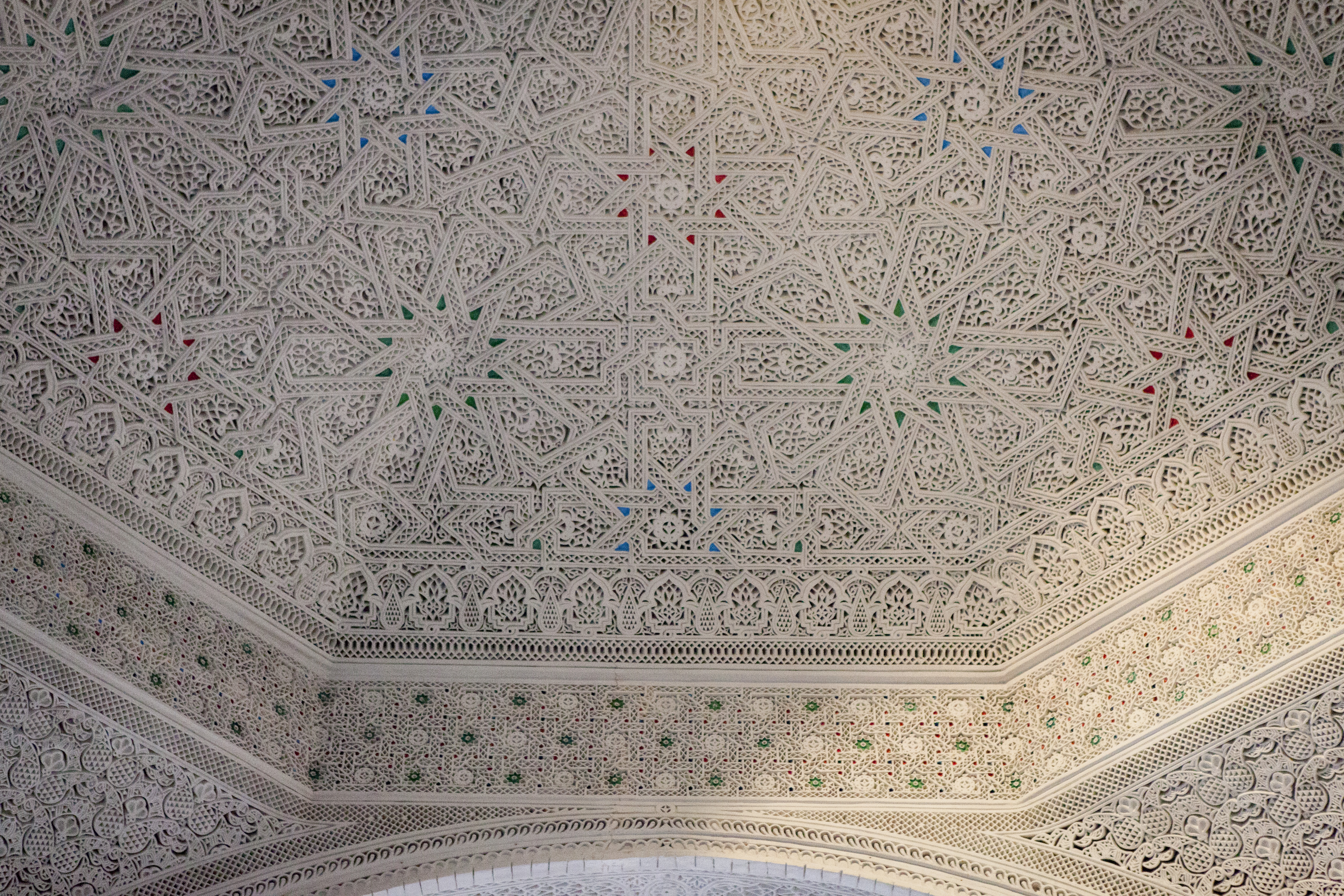
Ceiling of the Virgil room

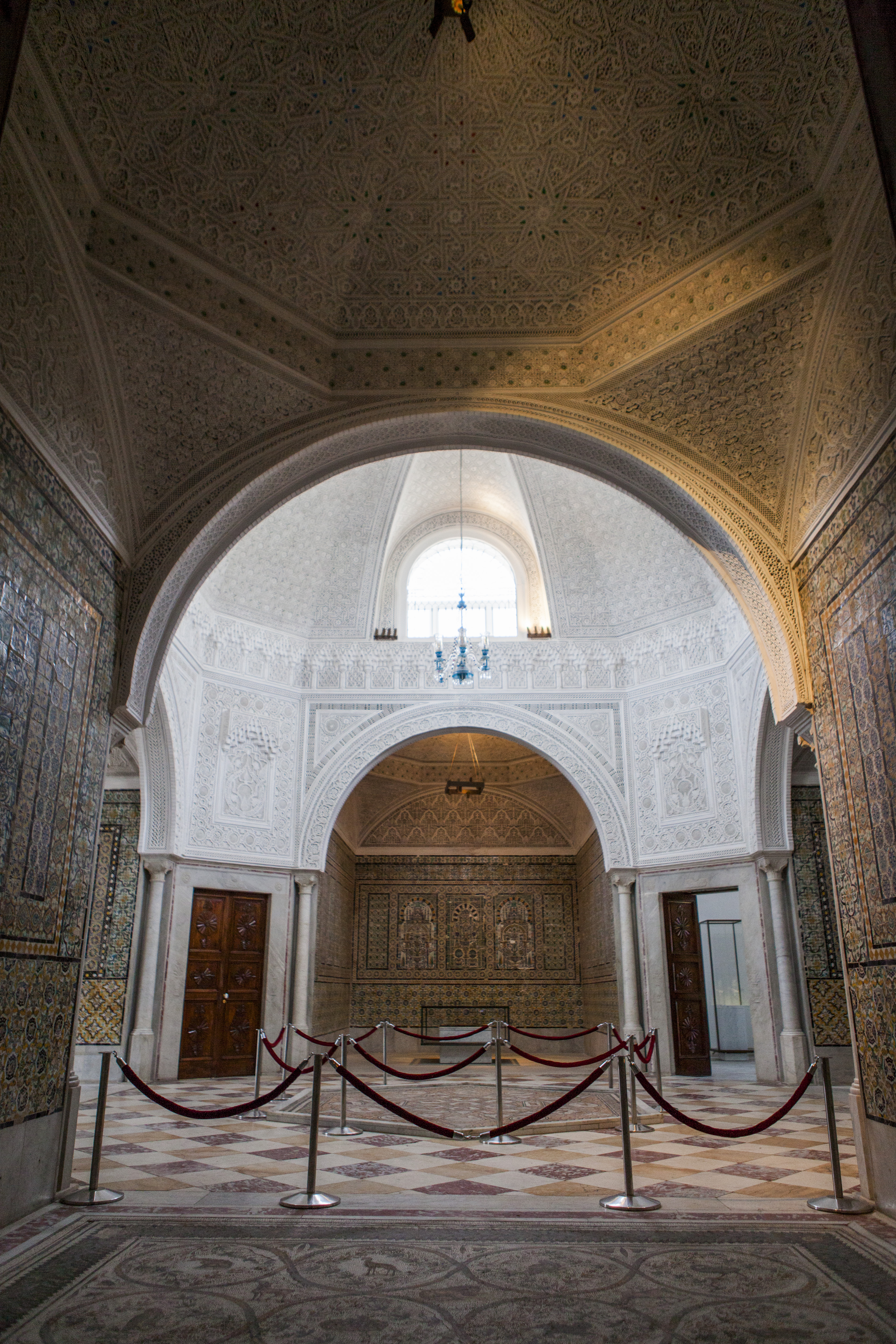
Apartments of the Bey, room called Virgil, after the name of the mosaic of Sousse that was exposed until the extension of the years CE 2010

== Technologies ==
Starting from 17 June 2014, the museum offers visitors a digital guide in English, French, and Arabic. Developed by Orange Tunisia using Near-field communication technology, it comes in the form of a free downloadable application for smartphones and visitors can also borrow a free smartphone at the museum entrance. It offers audio commentaries, photo slideshows, and a historical and geographical perspective of the displayed works.

== See also ==
- Culture of Tunisia
- List of museums in Tunisia
- List of largest art museums
- History of Tunisia
- History of Carthage
- Ancient Carthage
- Mosaic of Dominus Julius, Carthage
- North Africa during Antiquity
- Carthage National Museum
- Carthage Paleo-Christian Museum
- El Djem Archaeological Museum
- Nabeul Museum
- Mosaic of Dominus Julius, Carthage
- Sanctuary of Thinissut

== Literature ==
- Abidi, Beya (2005). Palais des beys aux environs de la ville de Tunis, El-Abdaliya à la Marsa et Dar el-Bey à Hammam-Lif (en arabe) (mémoire de master) (Thesis) (in Arabic). Tunis: Facultés des Lettres, des Arts et des Humanités de Manouba.
- Moumni, Ridha (2016). L'Éveil d'une nation [exposition, Tunis, Palais Qsar es-Saïd, du 27 novembre 2016 au 27 février 2017] (in French). Tunis: Officina Libraria. ISBN 978-88-99765-25-5.
- Revault, Jacques (1974). Palais et résidences d'été de la région de Tunis (XVIe-XIXe siècles) (in French). Paris: Editions du Centre National de la Recherche Scientifique. pp. 414–426. ISBN 2-222-01622-3.
