= Nassim Shamama =

Tunisian businessman and philanthropist

Nassim Shamama or Nessim Scemama (Arabic: نسيم شمامة) (born Tunis, Ottoman Empire, 1805 – died Livorno, Italy, 24 January 1873) was a Tunisian businessman and philanthropist. As a Tunisian Jew, he held the role of caïd (head) for the Jewish community of the country. He also worked for the Husseinid beys, occupying the post of Receiver General and then Director of Finance. After amassing a huge fortune from his official positions he left Tunisia and after his death his estate became the subject of several famous and protracted international lawsuits.

== Early life and public career ==
Nassim Shamama was born in Tunis, then at least officially under the Ottoman Empire, in 1805.

Son of Rabbi Salomon Samama and Aziza Krief, he was considered "the head of the richest and most regarded Jewish family in the entire Tunis regency". We do not know anything about his youth but Nessim Scemama started very early in the fabric business. His shop in the Hara, the Jewish quarter, barely made enough to allow him to live and support his family, including his three wives. One of his clients, General Benaïd, was dazzled by his skill, speech and calculation abilities, and this allowed him to rub shoulders with the senior administration of the regency. Leaving his shop, he agreed to become a servant of the general's and took up the position of cashier to Mahmoud Ben Ayed. From at least 1843, he was responsible for collecting taxes. He obtained charge of the general customs revenue in 1849, followed later by the concessions on customs income from Sfax and Sousse, as well as for soap, lime, bricks, salt and charcoal. In 1852 or 1853, he went into the service of the Grand Vizier Mustapha Khaznadar, becoming Receiver General of Finances or Treasurer General. He held the post of director of finance from April 1860, becoming so rich that in May 1862 he offered a loan of ten million rials to Khaznadar at an interest rate of 12%.

== Batto Sfez affair ==
In June 1856, Nassim Shamama became involved in the Batto Sfez Affair which concerned the trial and subsequent execution of his coachman. Following a traffic incident and an altercation with a Muslim, Sfez was accused of having insulted Islam. Found guilty, he was sentenced by a sharia court to the death penalty for blasphemy and beheaded on June 24, 1857. Mohammed Bey sought thereby to allay public resentment arising from the earlier execution of a Muslim accused of having killed a Jew. Shamama himself was safe from the Tunisian authorities because he enjoyed French consular protection. The harshness of the sentence against Sfez aroused great emotion in the Jewish community and among the consuls of France and the United Kingdom, Léon Roches and Richard Wood. They exerted pressure on the bey so that he issued a declaration of liberal reforms similar to those promulgated in the Ottoman Empire in 1839.

== Community leadership ==
In October 1859, on the death of his probable uncle, the caid Joseph Shemama, the British and French consuls successfully lobbied the Bey to make Nessim Samama caid of the Jewish community in Tunisia. He contributed to the building and improvement of places of worship, including the construction of the Great Synagogue of Tunis. He also persuaded the bey to exempt the Jewish community from corvée labour. Local accounts retain the memory of him as an unparalleled philanthropist: he made marriages and provided dowries for poor girls and helped the needy in the city. He had a large house (known today as Dar Caïd Nessim Samama) built for himself on El Mechnaka Street, which later housed the school for young girls of the Alliance Israélite Universelle, a synagogue bearing his name and a very well-endowed library. He was one of the architects of rapprochement between Tunisia and France; in 1860 he met Empress Eugenie and Napoleon III, who made him a Knight of the Legion of Honor a few years later.

== Flight and exile ==
Following the Mejba Revolt and the suspension of the Constitution of 1861, Shemama left for Paris on June 8, 1864, officially on a mission to negotiate a new loan, but actually escaping the country taking with him key financial dossiers, compromising documents and twenty million rials, accumulated through abuses of his position. He moved to number 47 rue du Faubourg-Saint-Honoré, buying hotels in the rue de Chaillot, a country house in Beaumont-sur-Oise and a property in Sèvres.

The Franco-Prussian War of 1870 forced him to leave for Italy. He settled permanently in Livorno in 1871, from where he continued to manage his property in the Hara. King Victor-Emmanuel II secured for him the rank of papal count, making him the first Jew to acquire this title. He died on 24 January 1873 in Livorno, Italy.

== Legacy and lawsuits ==
Shamama died childless and a number of family members both in Tunisia and abroad sought to stake a claim to his vast fortune. In addition his estate was pursued by the Bey of Tunis, who sought to recover some of the funds that Shamama had stolen. Prime Minister Mustapha Khaznadar came to an arrangement with three of Shamama's heirs to settle all claims in return for 5% of their inheritance, but it transpired that this money would have been kept by Khaznadar himself and not remitted to the state treasury. The heirs in Tunisia then sought assistance from the French and Italian consuls and left Tunisia for Livorno. Central to the disputes was a disagreement about who had jurisdiction over Shamama's affairs; born a Tunisian, he was rumoured to have adopted Italian nationality. In 1878 a Livorno court decided that he had died stateless, having renounced his Tunisian nationality. These successive court cases spanned more than fifteen years in all.

The Bey initiated proceedings in France against Shamama's old patron Mahmoud Ben Ayed; once a French arbitration panel found Ben Ayed liable to repay a large sum to the Bey, Ben Ayed began his own case against the Shamama estate, arguing that Shamama had been in league with his enemies to despoil him of his rightful belongings. Ben Ayed's case failed, but with the Bey of Tunis still seeking restitution, Shamama's heirs sold their interest in the estate to Baron Erlanger for 11 million francs in 1879. In October 1881 Erlanger signed a convention with the Tunisian government that divided the estate with 72% remaining with Erlanger and just 22% to the Tunisian government. Over the following years the Tunisian government actually recuperated less than 8 million francs while Erlanger retained 20 million.
