= Sidi Bou Hadid Mosque =

Mosque in Tunis, Tunisia

- جامع سيدي بو حديد
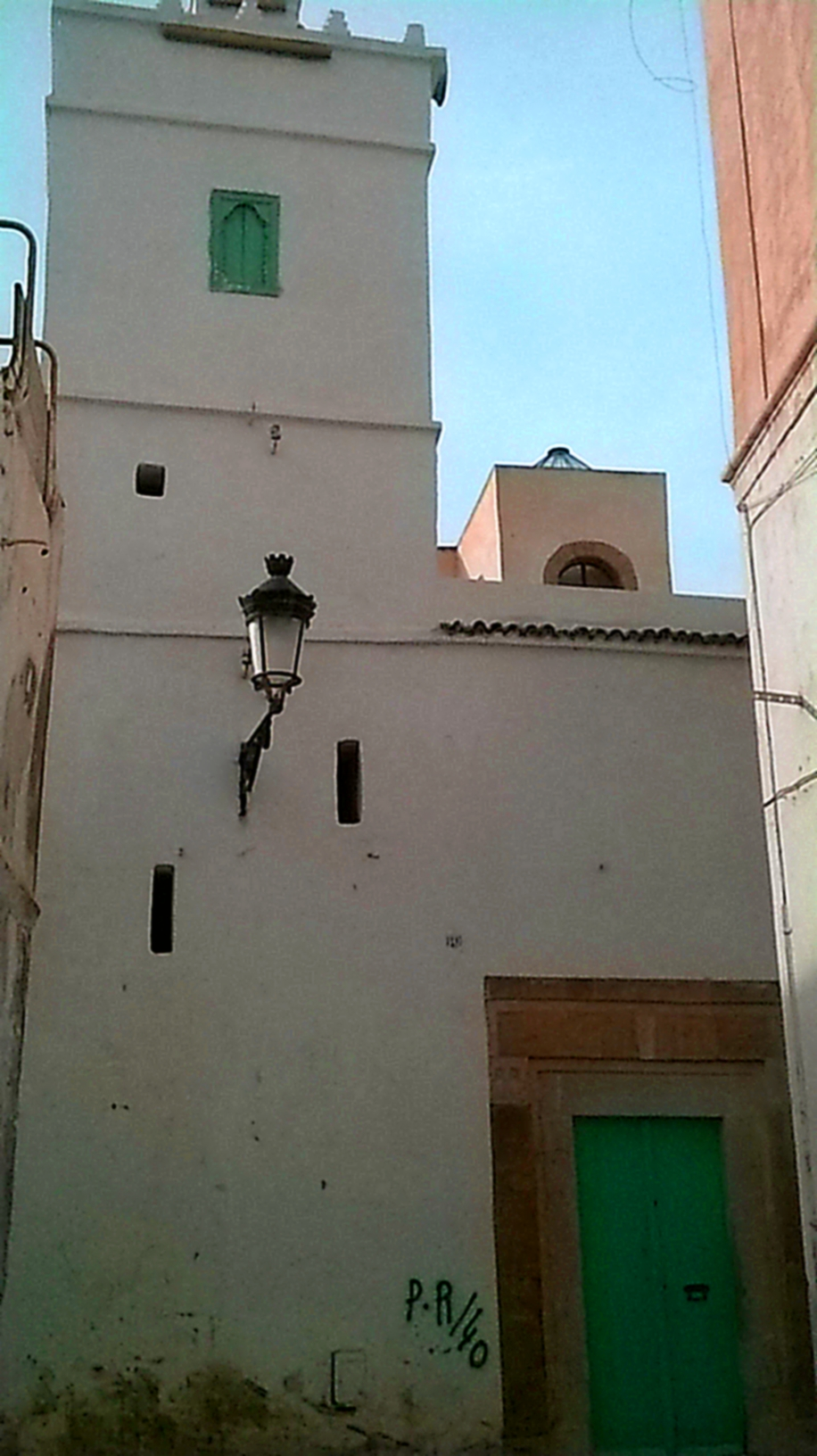

- Location within Tunisia

Religion
- Affiliation: Sunni Islam

Location
- Location: Tunis, Tunisia
- Coordinates: 36.79899°N 10.166628°E

Architecture
- Type: Mosque

Sidi Bou Hadid Mosque (Arabic: جامع سيدي بو حديد), also known as the Sidi Amor small mosque, is a Tunisian mosque located in the north of the medina of Tunis.

== Localization ==
The mosque is located in 50 the Pacha Street.

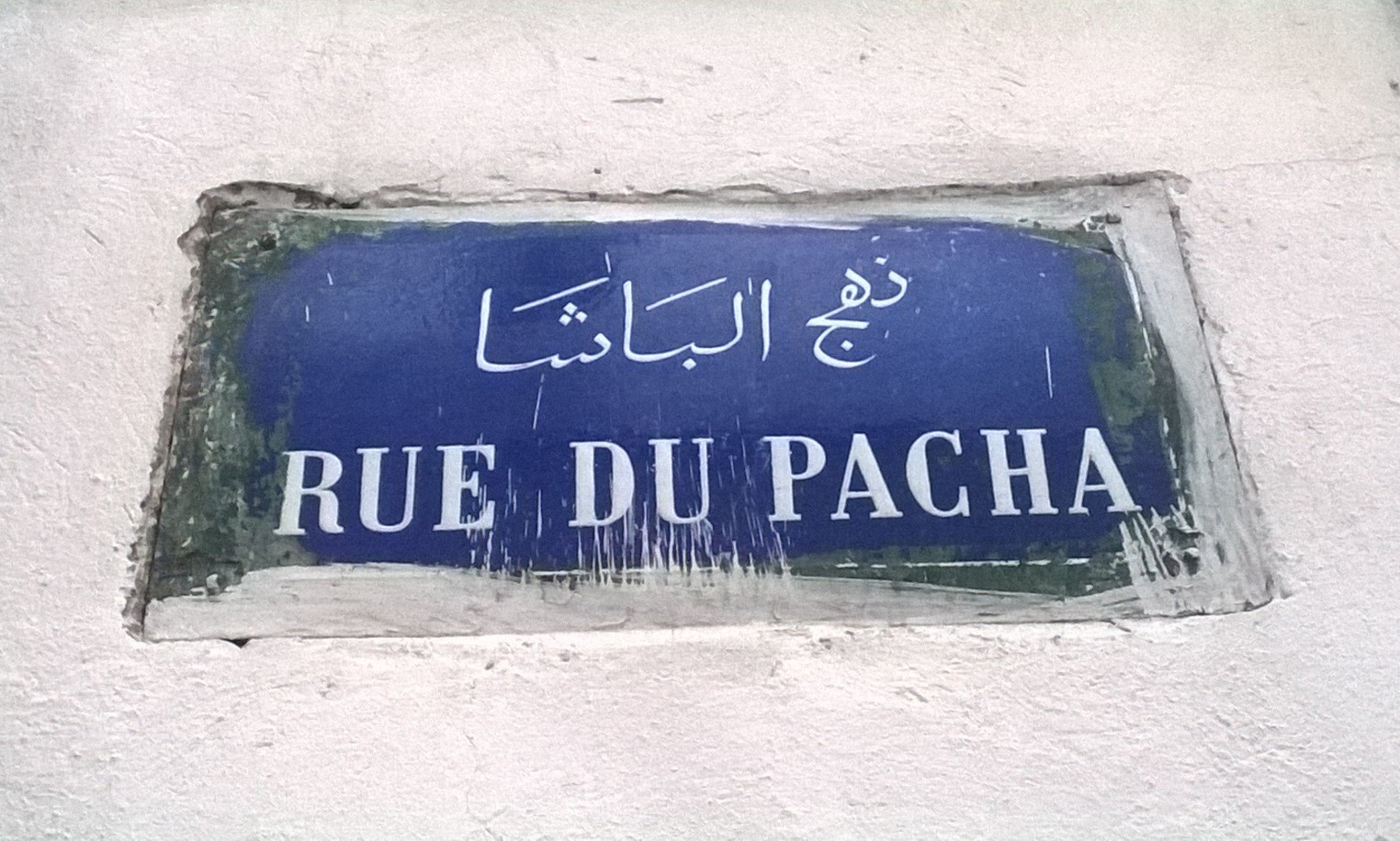
Metallic plaque of the Pacha street

== Etymology ==
The mosque got its name from the saint Sidi Bou Hadid, who lived in the 12th century AD who was buried in the Hara (the Jewish hood in the medina) near Bab Cartagena.

== History ==
According to the historian Mohamed Belkhodja, the mosque was built years after Sidi Bou Hadid's death.

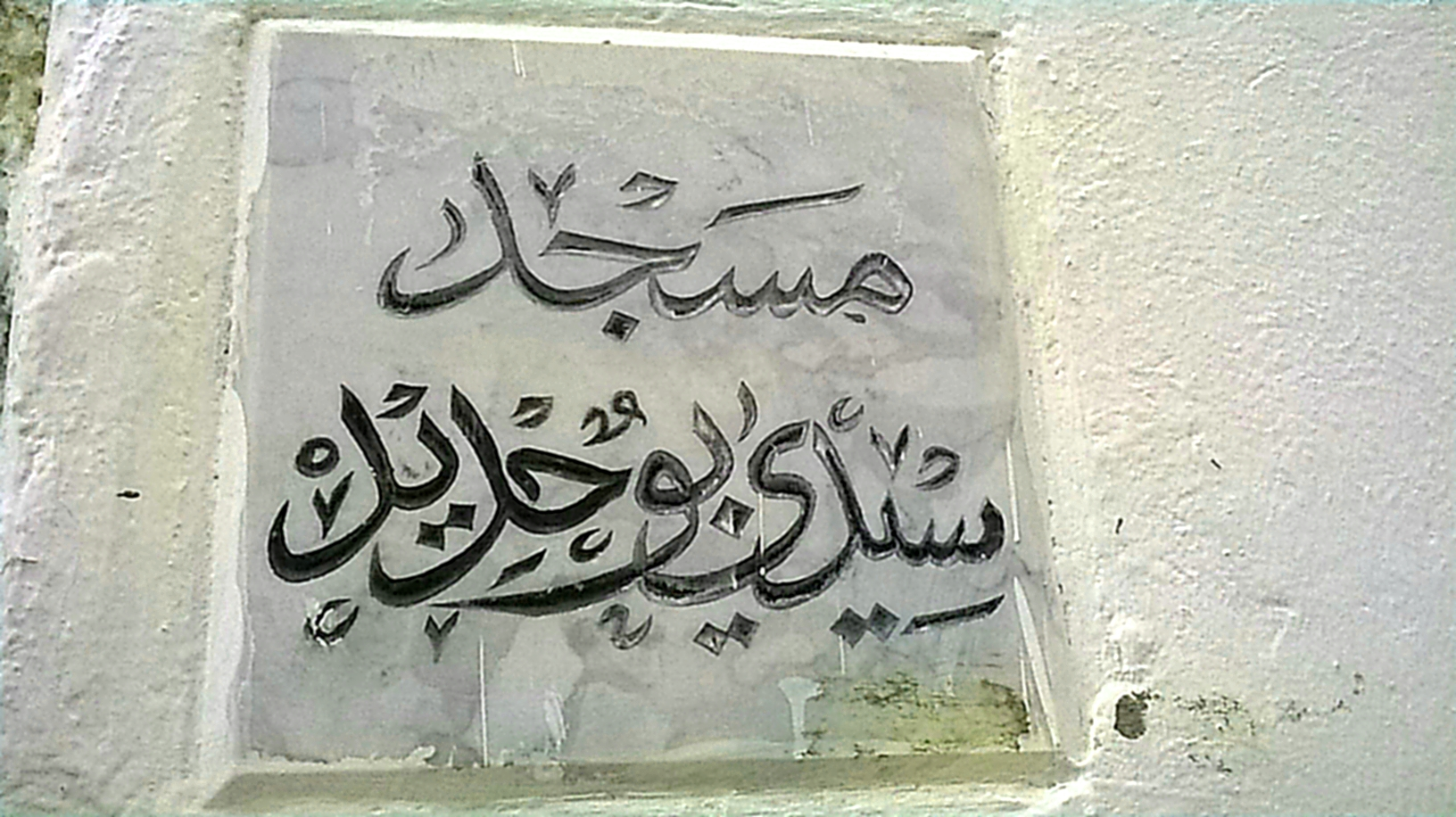
Marble panel with the name of the mosque

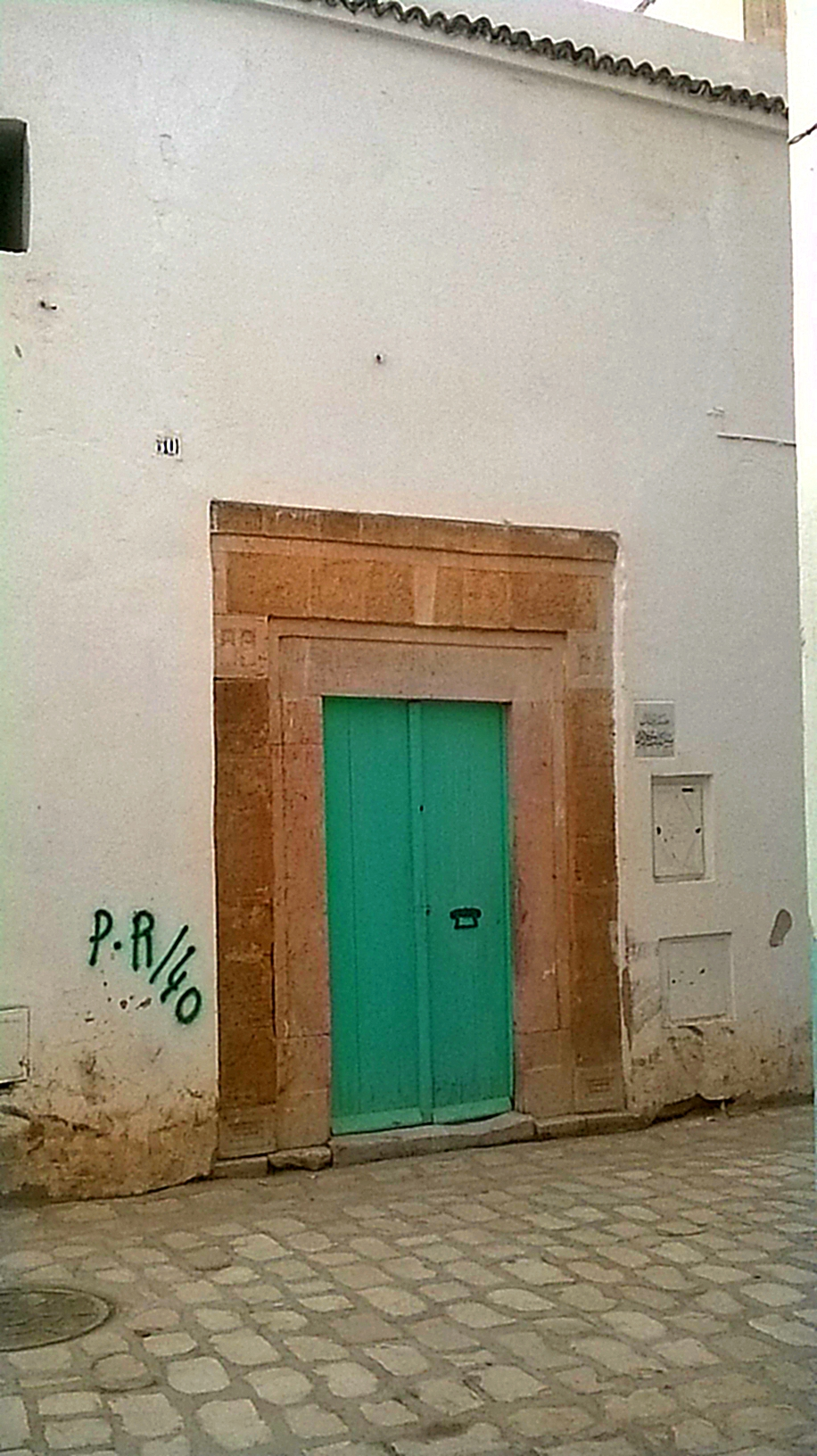
Entrance of the mosque

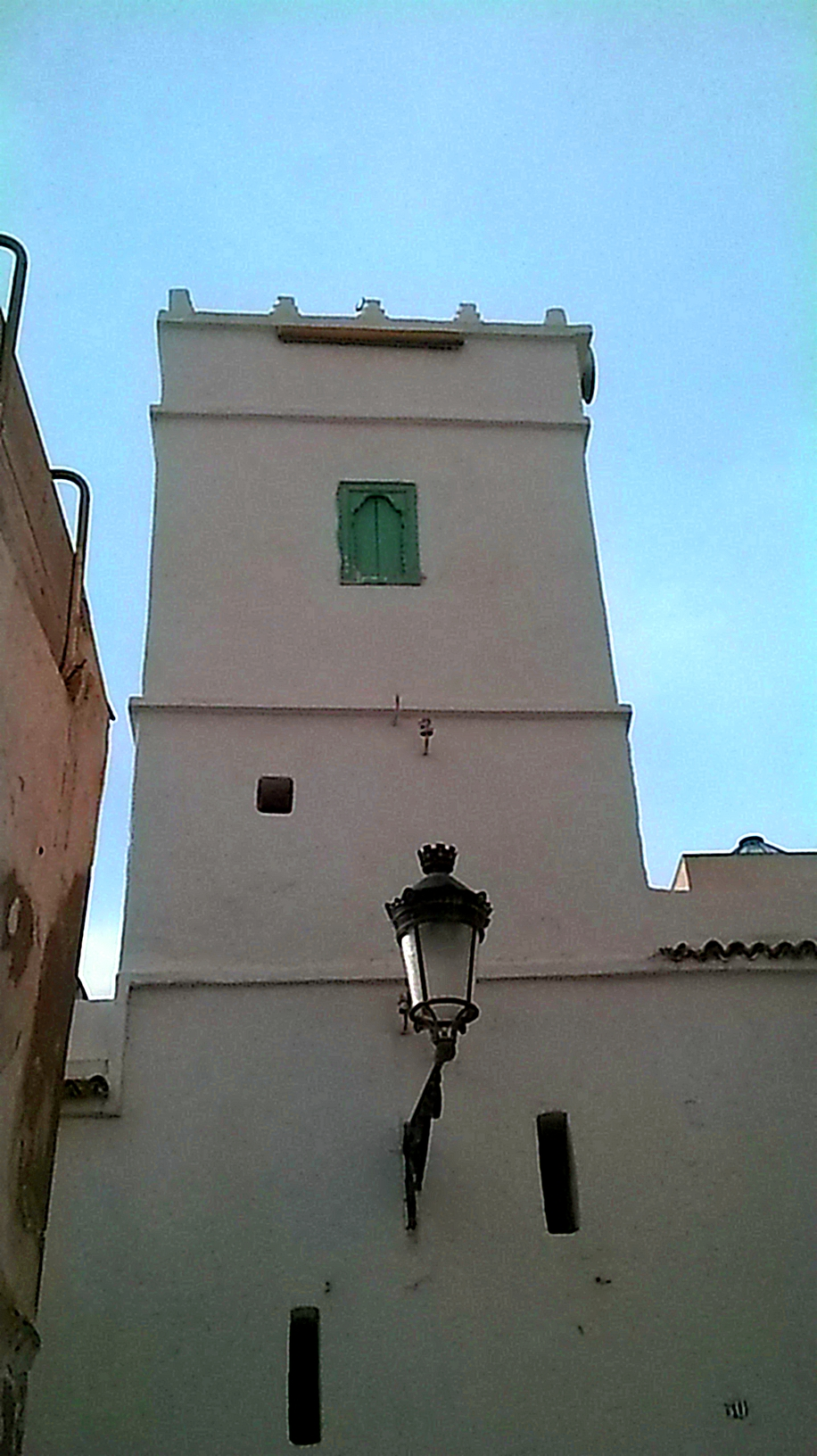
Minaret of the mosque
