= Or Thora Synagogue =

Or Thora Synagogue may refer to:

- Or Thora Synagogue (Tunis)
- Or Thora Synagogue (Marseille)
