= Sidi Mardoum Mosque =

Former mosque in Tunis, Tunisia

- مسجد سيدي مردوم

Religion
- Affiliation: Islam
- Branch/tradition: Sunni

Location
- Location: Tunis, Tunisia

Architecture
- Type: Mosque

Sidi Mardoum Mosque (Arabic: مسجد سيدي مردوم) was a Tunisian mosque located in the north-east of the medina of Tunis. It does not exist anymore.

== Localization ==
The mosque was located in Sidi Mardoum Street in the Hara hood, near Bab Cartagena, one of the gates of the Medina that got destroyed.

== Etymology ==
It got its name from a saint, Sidi Mardoum.
