= Dar Caïd Nessim Samama =

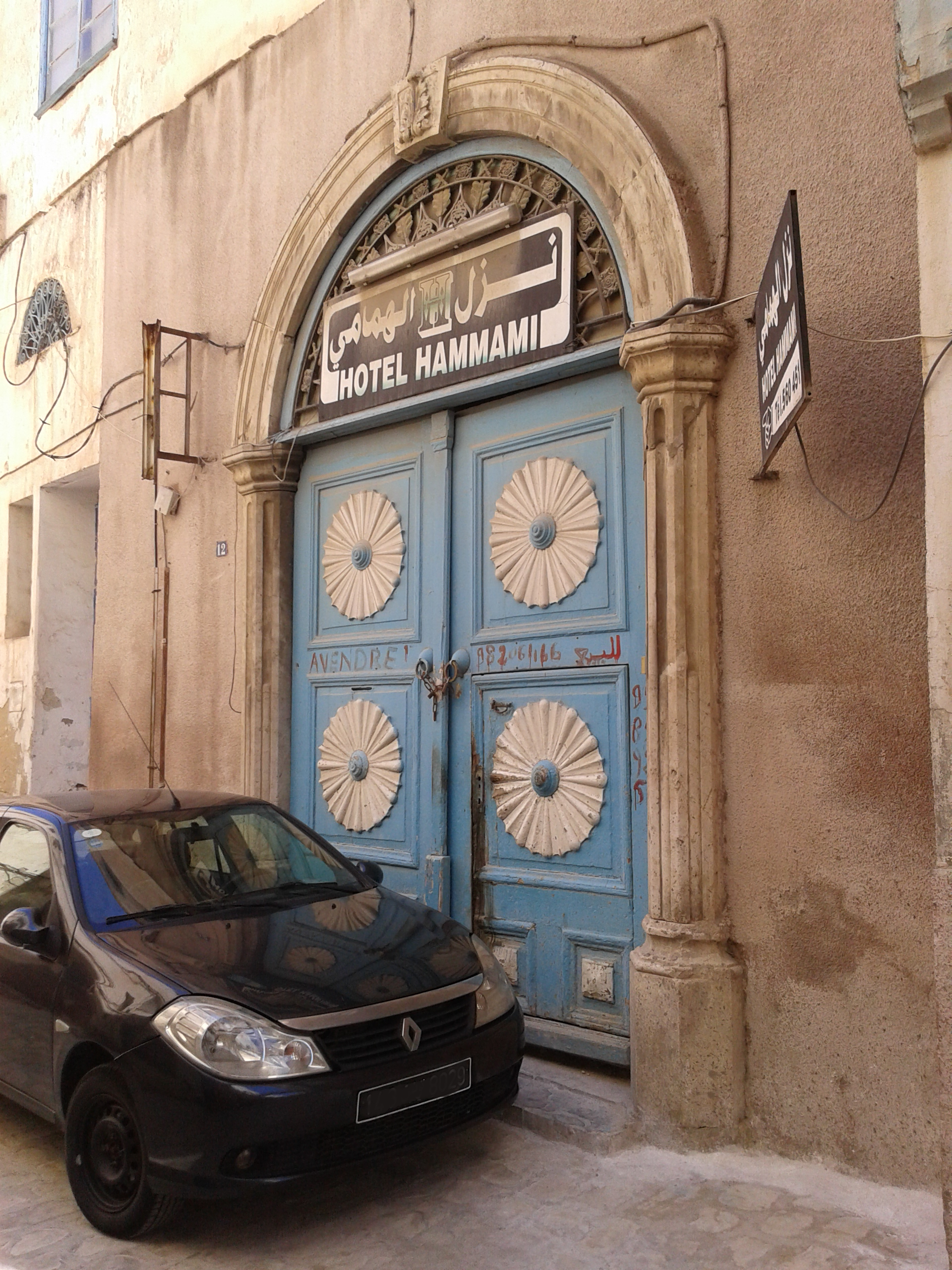

General information
- Type: Palace
- Architectural style: Tunisian; Italian
- Location: Medina of Tunis, Tunis, Tunisia
- Year built: 1880
- Client: Nassim Shamama

Dar Caïd Nessim Samama is one of the palaces of the medina of Tunis.

== Localization ==
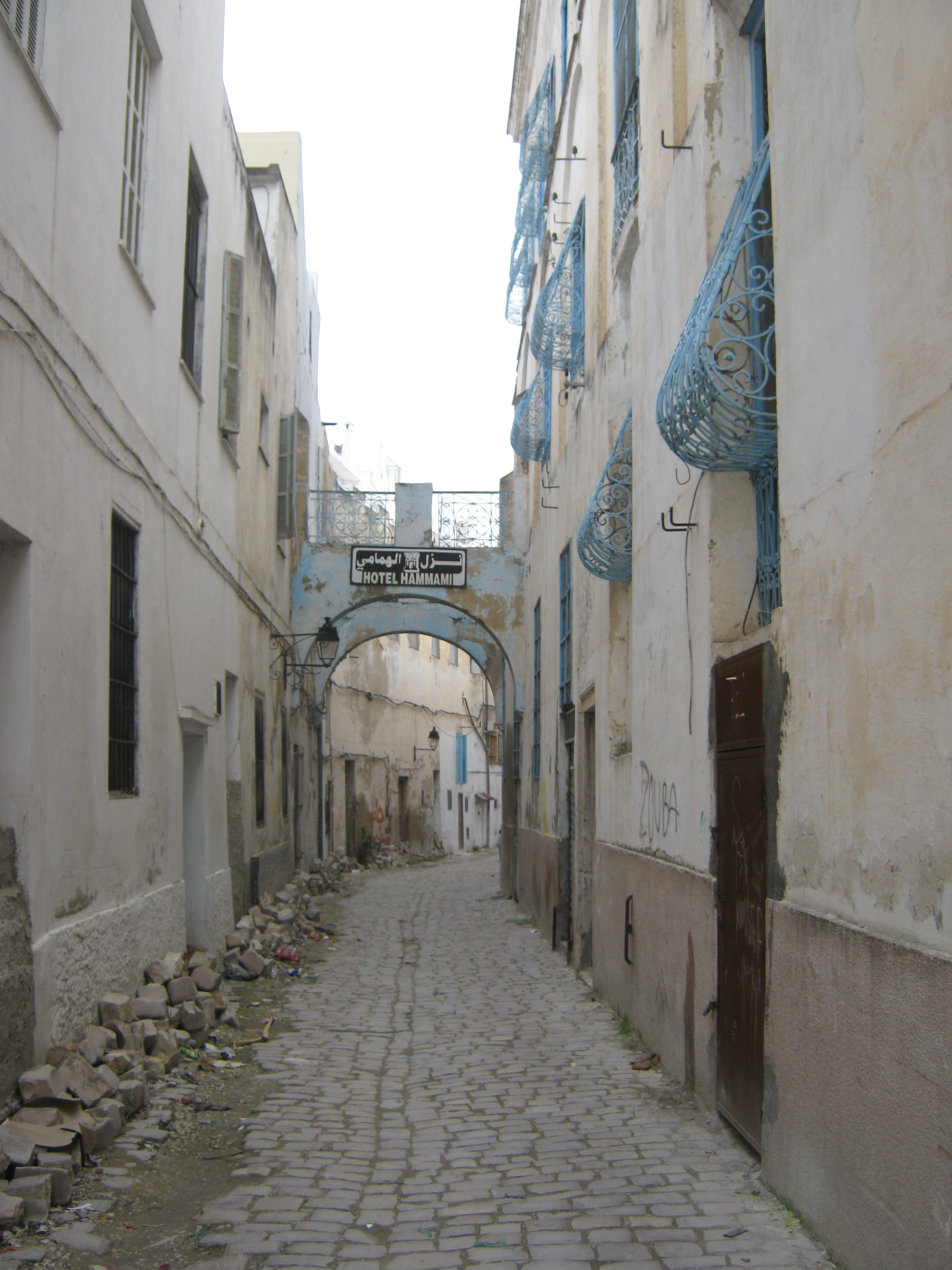
View of the El Mechnaka street with the palace on the right

It is located on the El Mechnaka Street near El Kallaline, Bab Cartagena and Hafsia.

== History ==
The qaid of Jews and treasurer of the bey of Tunis, Nessim Samama, built this palace in 1860.

In 1881, the Alliance Israélite Universelle transformed it into a school for girls.

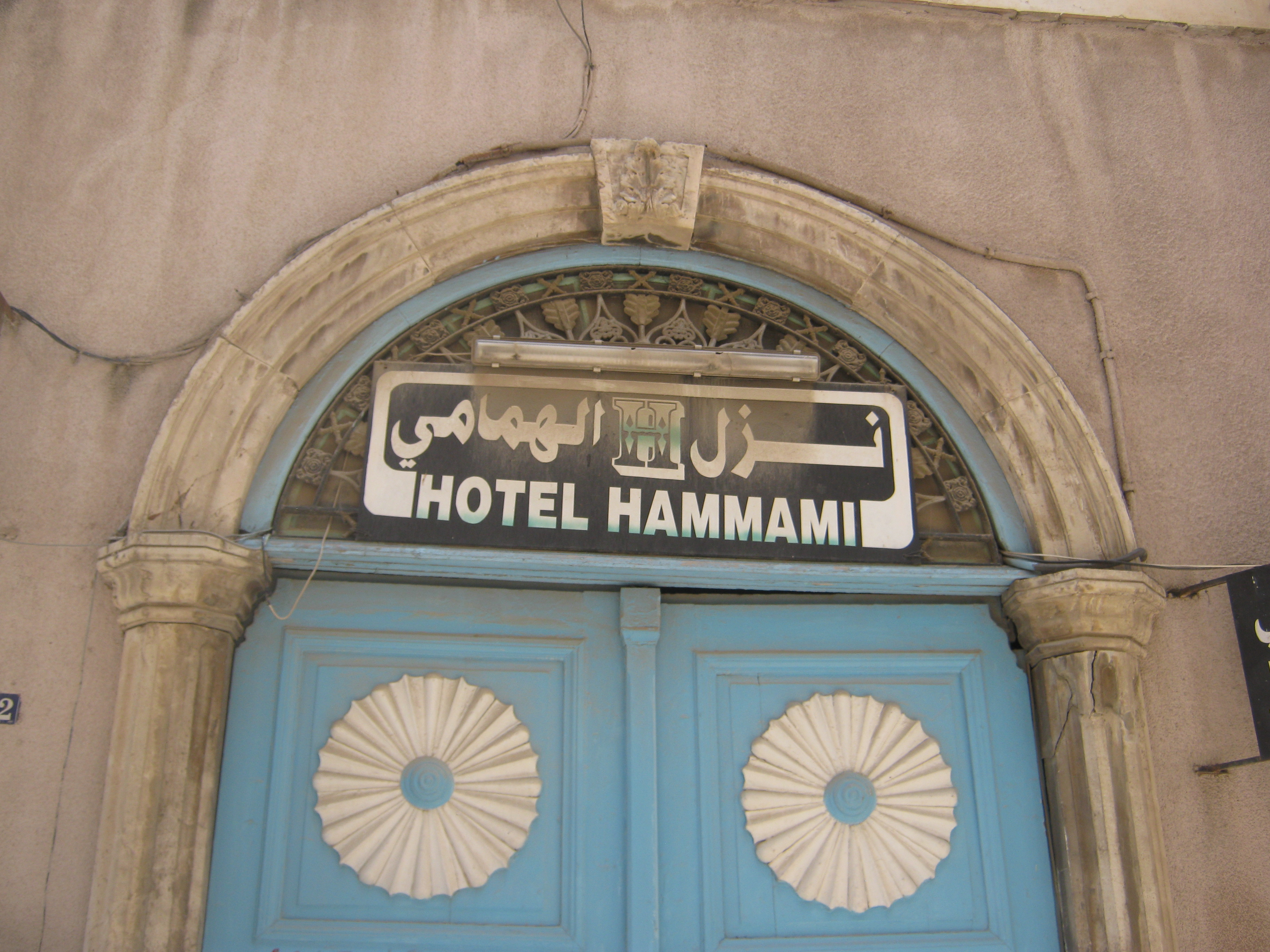
Entrance of the palace

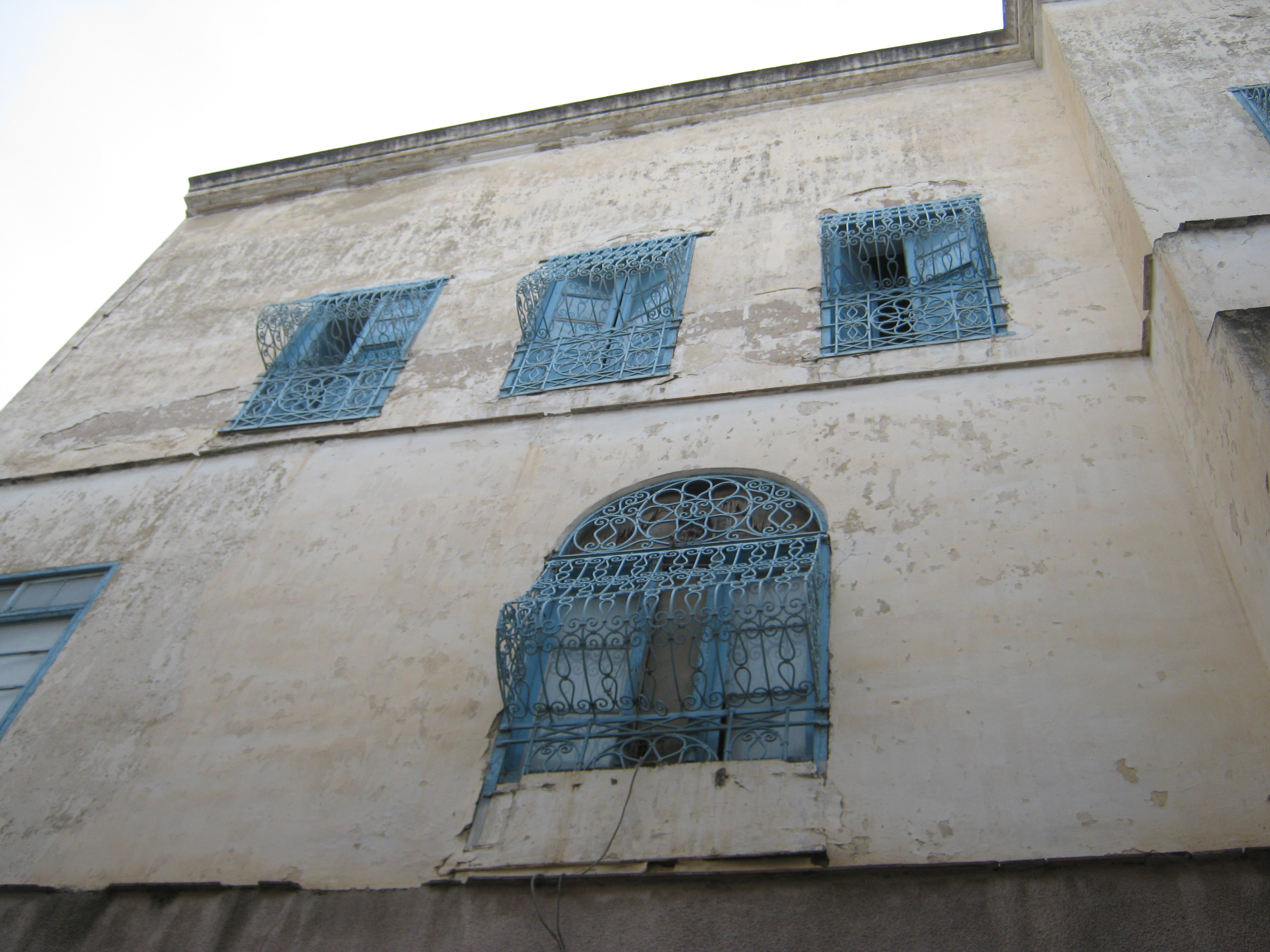
Facade of the Nessim Samama palace

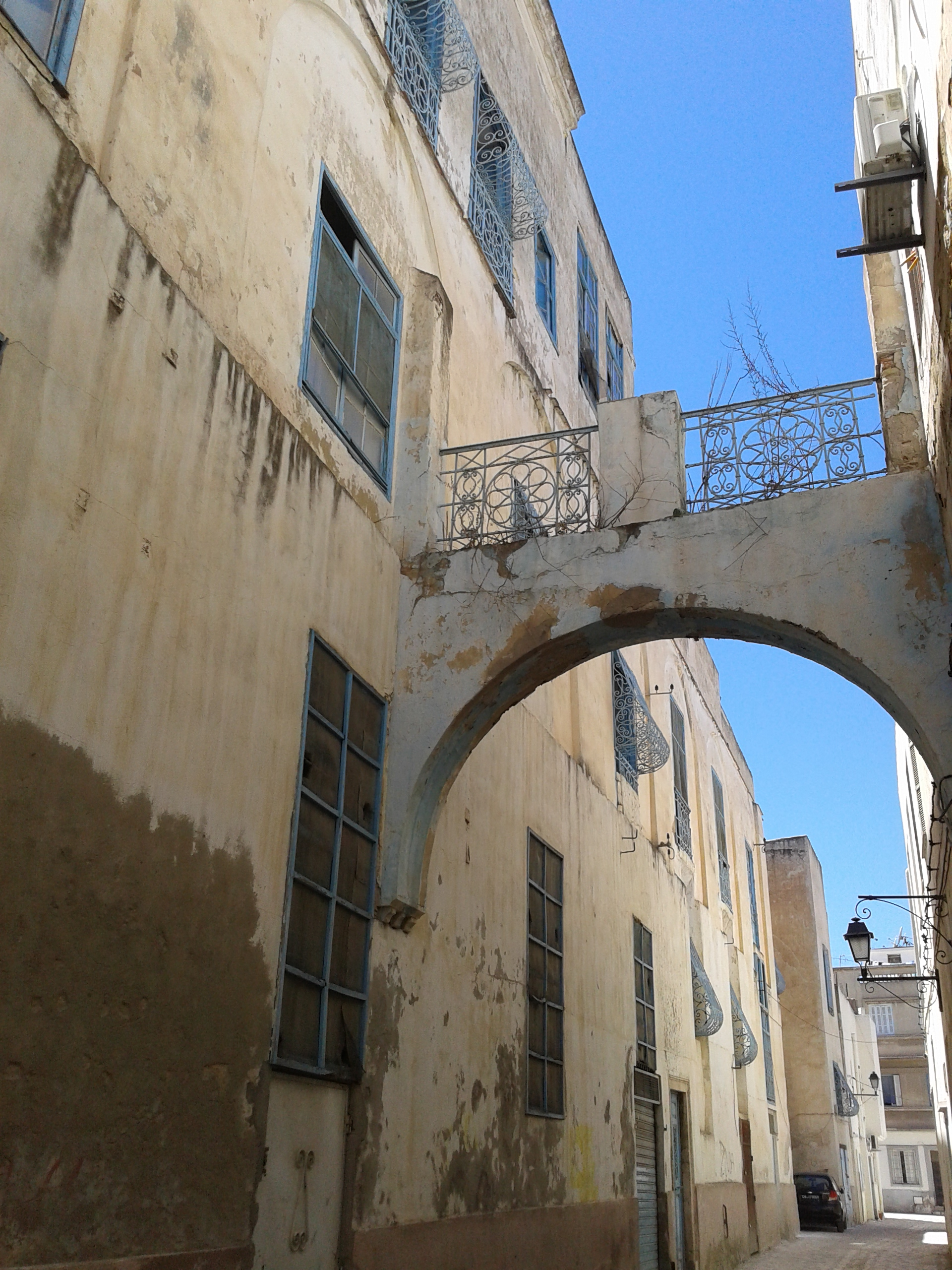
Palace of Caid Nessim Samama

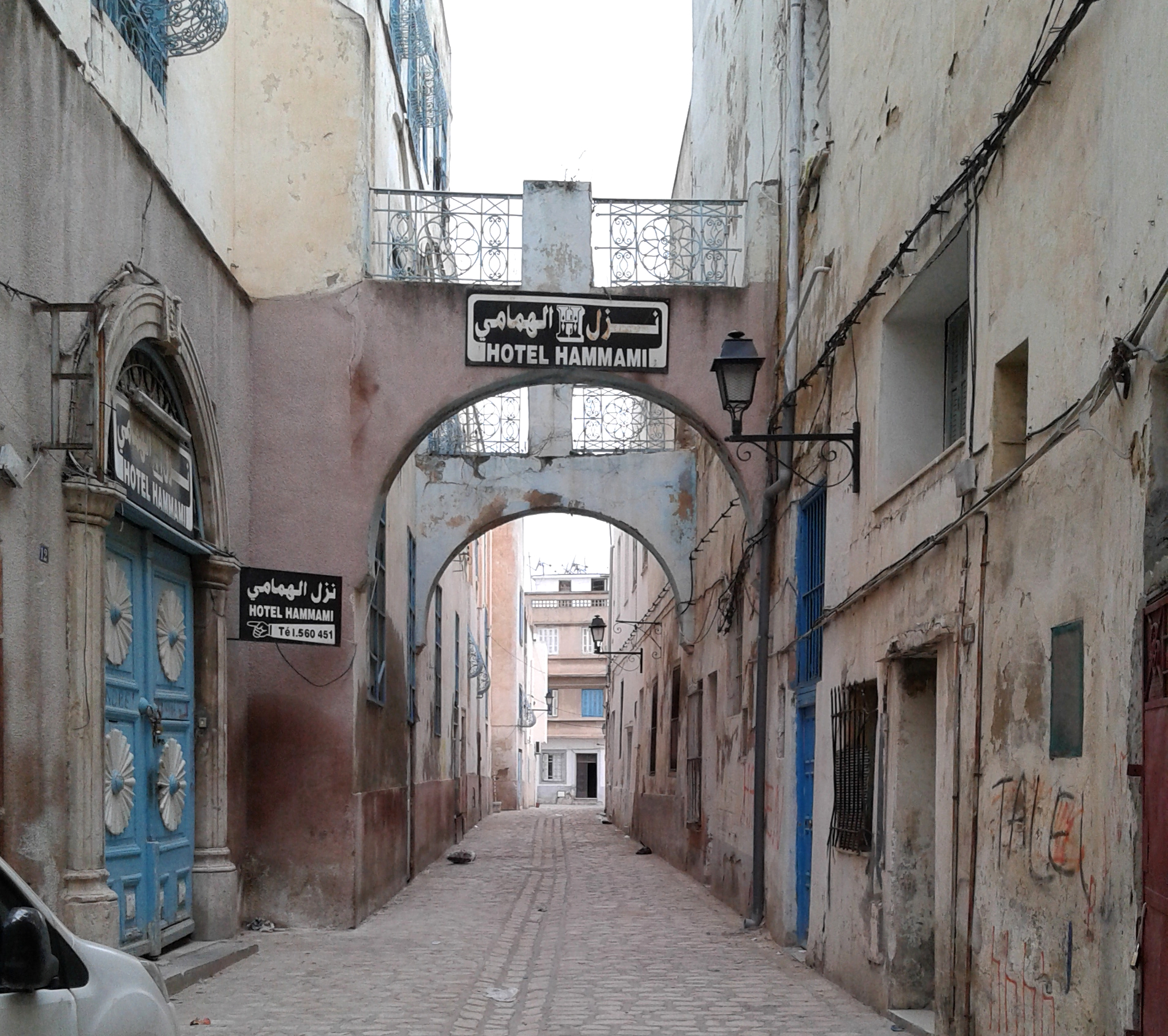
El mechnaqa Street

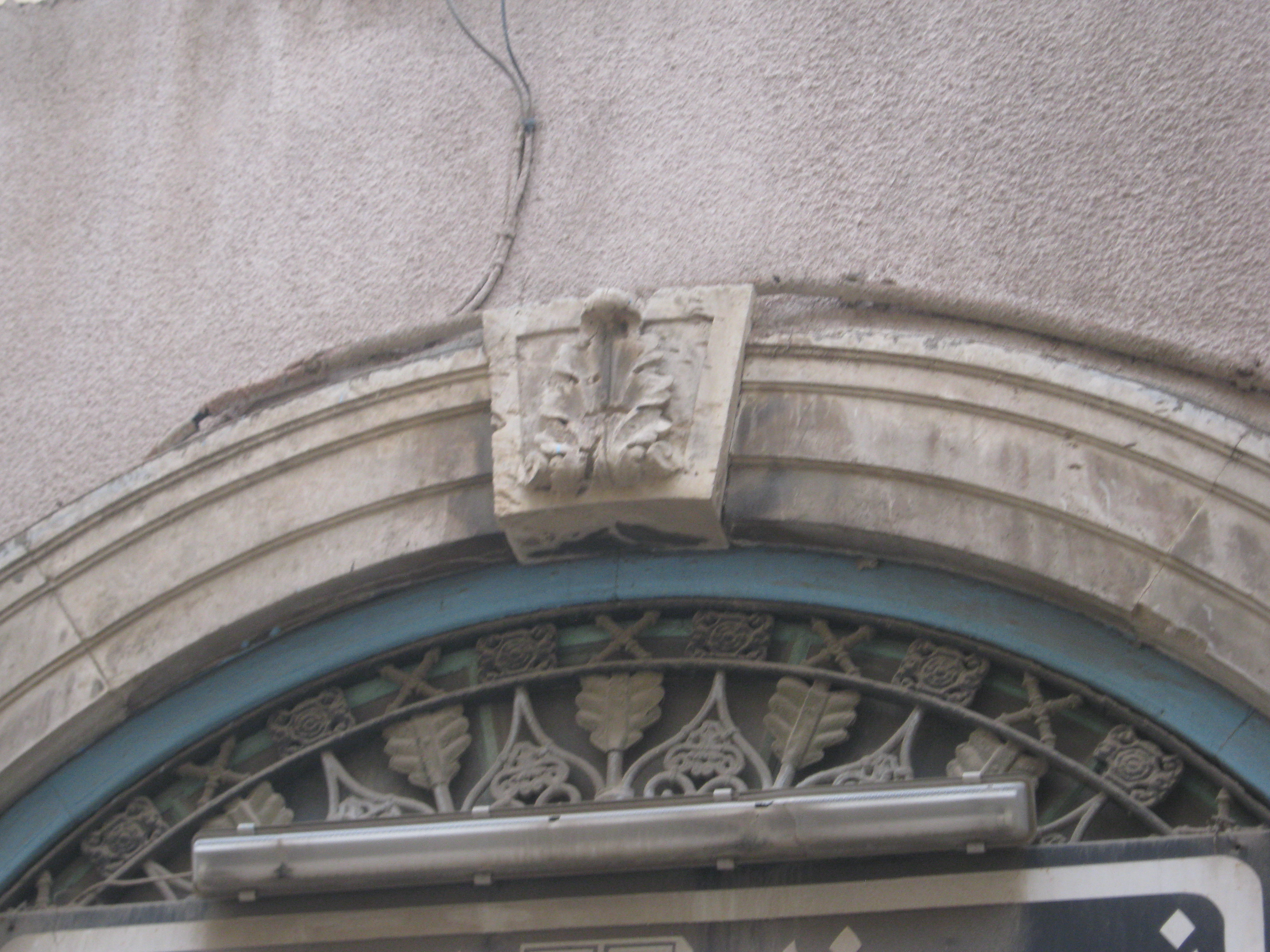
Detail of the decoration of the entrance
