= El Hafsia Mosque =

Mosque in Tunis, Tunisia

- جامع الحفصية
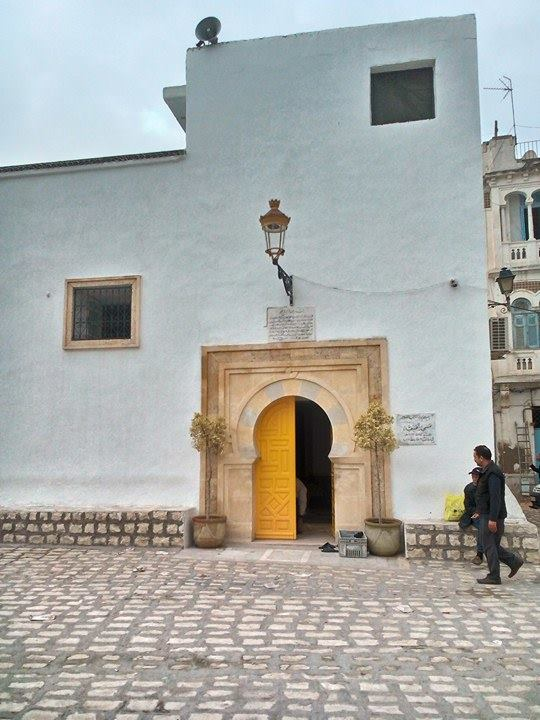

- Location within Tunisia

Religion
- Affiliation: Islam
- Branch/tradition: Sunni

Location
- Location: Tunis, Tunisia
- Interactive map of El Hafsia Mosque
- Coordinates: 36.802204°N 10.171951°E

Architecture
- Type: Mosque
- Groundbreaking: 1954
- Completed: 1956

El Hafsia Mosque (Arabic: جامع الحفصية) is a small mosque in the Hafsia Hood in the north of the medina of Tunis.

== Localization ==
It is located in 23 Achour Street.

== History ==
According to the panel at the entrance of the mosque, it was built during the reign of Muhammad VIII al-Amin. The construction started in 1954 thanks to the grant offered by Salah Ben Ali Ben Belgacem Bouzinbila El Douiri, and finished two years later in 1956. It was restored in 2011.

== Etymology ==
The mosque got its name from the hood in which it is located that was originally called El Hara or the Jewish hood.

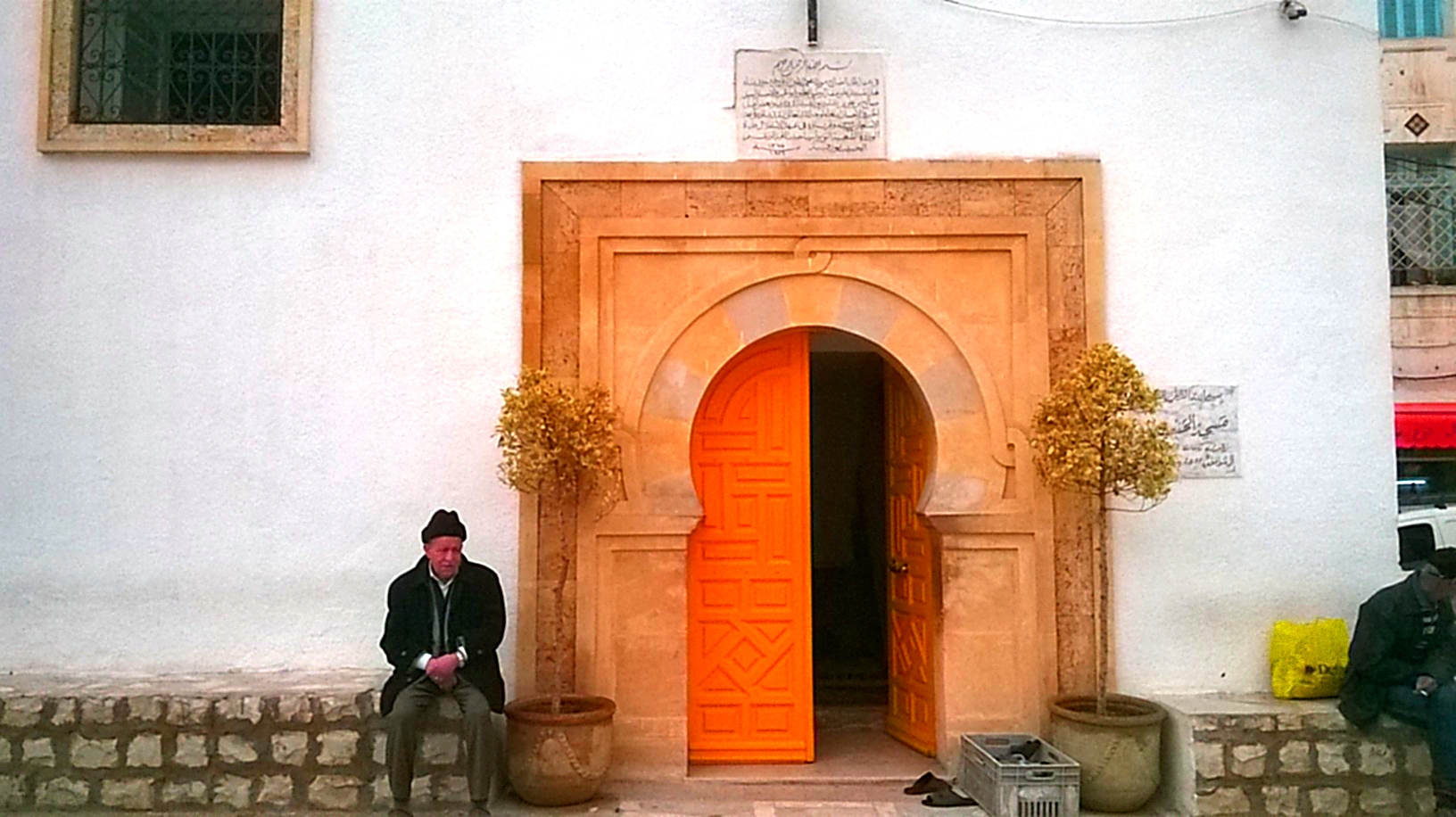
Entrance of the mosque

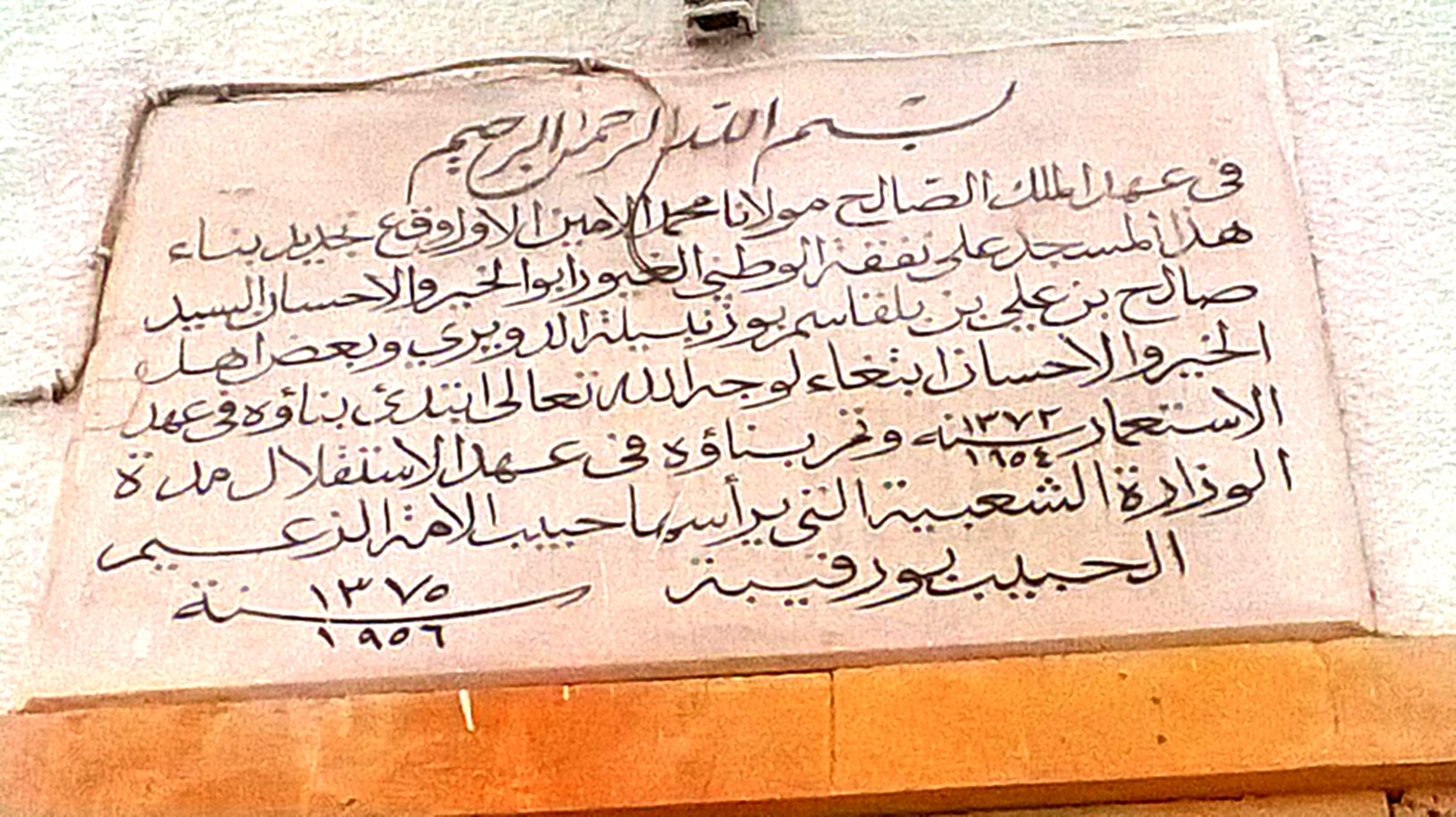
Commemorative panel of the mosque

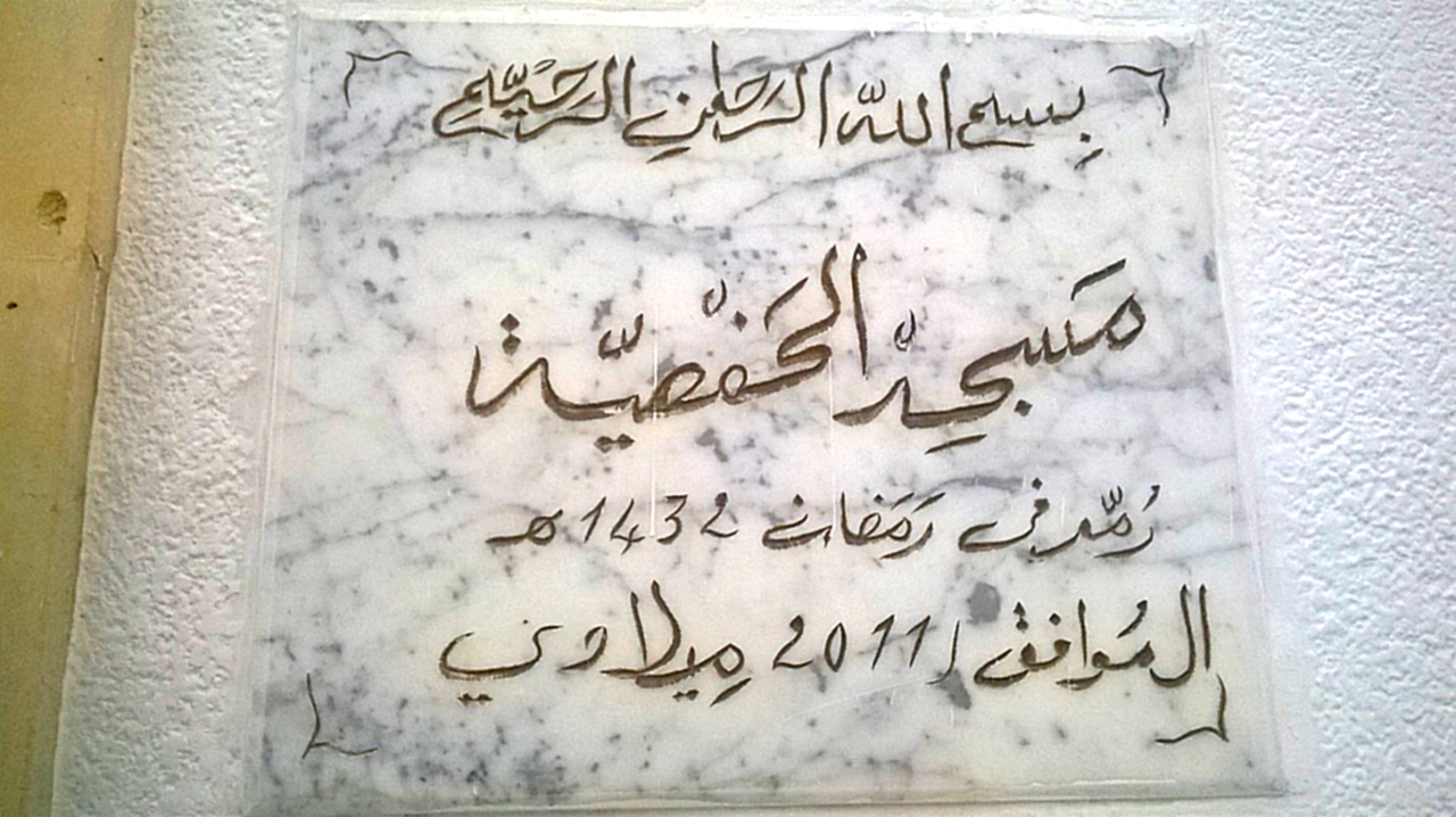
A marbel plaque with the restoration date
