= Sidi El Hari Mosque =

Mosque in Tunis, Tunisia

- مسجد سيدي الحاري

Religion
- Affiliation: Sunni Islam

Location
- Location: Tunis, Tunisia

Architecture
- Type: Mosque

Sidi El Hari Mosque (Arabic: مسجد سيدي الحاري) was a Tunisian mosque for Aissawa brotherhood located in the north-east of the medina of Tunis. It does not exist anymore.

== Localization ==
The mosque was located in Sidi El Hari Street, bear Bab Cartagena, one of the gates of the medina that got destroyed.

== Etymology ==
It got its name from a saint, Sidi El Hari whose zaouia is a classified monument.
