= Mahmoud Ben Ayed =

Tunisian politician (1805–1880)

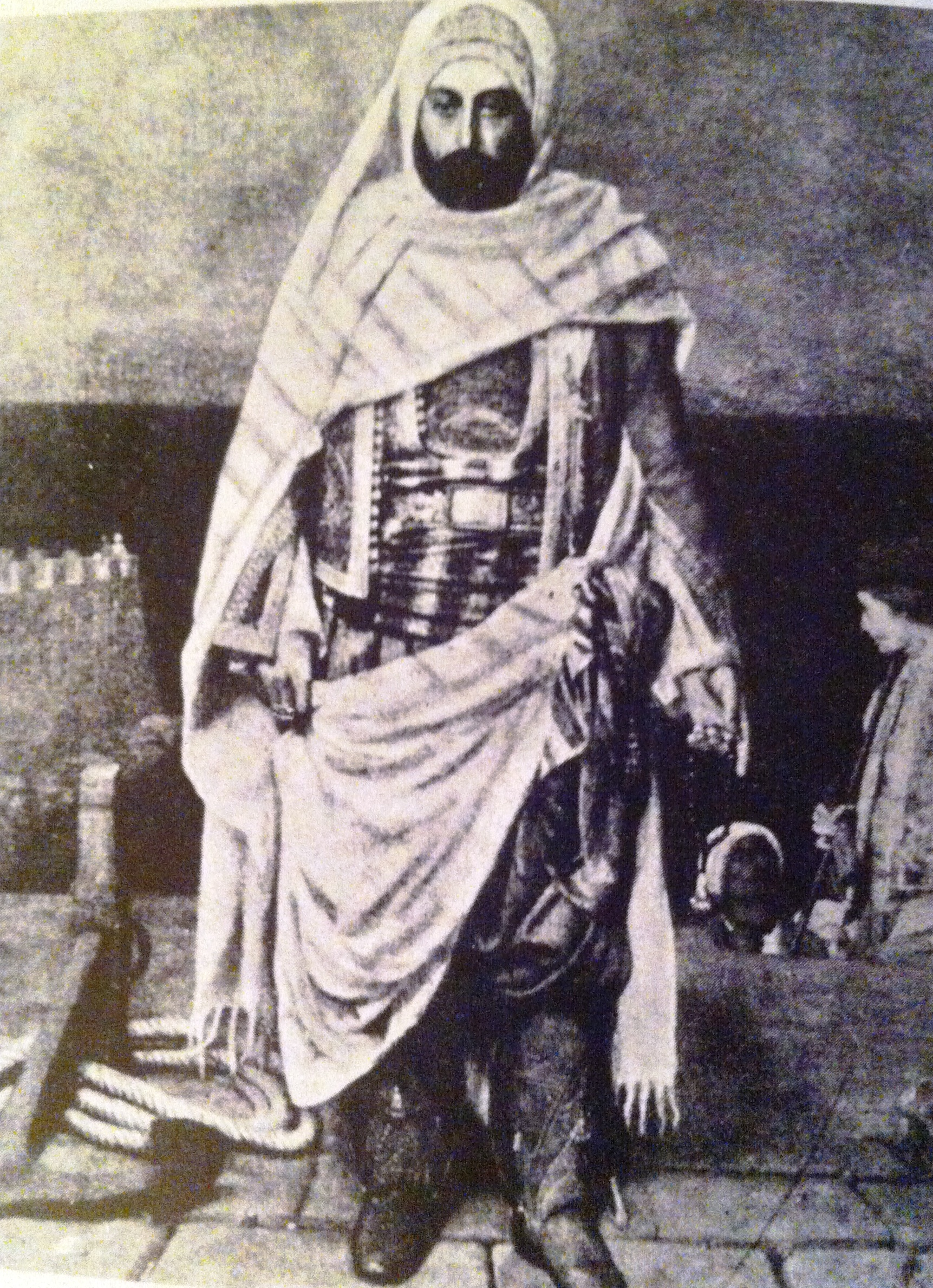
Ayed circa 1860.

Mahmoud Ben Ayed, Mahmoud Ben Ayad (Arabic: محمود بن عياد), born in 1805 in Tunis and died in 1880 in Istanbul, was a Tunisian politician. His misappropriation of funds while in office led the Tunisian state to bankruptcy and financial dependence on Europe, and was thus one of the causes of the establishment of the French protectorate of Tunisia.

== Career in Tunisia ==
Ben Ayed came from a makhzen family of Djerbian origin, which entered service after 1756 in the Beylical court and formed a dynasty of caïds, corsair shipowners and tax farmers. His father Mohamed Ben Ayed was a prominent figure at the court of Ahmed Bey. Ben Ayed was involved in the startup of various modern industrial enterprises in Tunisia, and gradually gained control of the tax farms on hides, salt, tobacco, and provisioning the army. He also provided the court with all kinds of goods, from construction materials to wine and jewellery. He was closely associated with Mustapha Khaznadar, and, for five years, enjoyed exceptional favor at court. He became caïd of Bizerte and Djerba, and held the rank of minister from 1837.

In July 1847, Ben Ayad established Dar al-Mal as Tunisia's bank of issue, printing the first domestic banknotes of the Islamic world. The purpose of the institution was to help finance Ahmed Bey's ambitious modernisation plans, but Ben Ayed used it for his own profiteering on a similarly ambitious scale. People did not trust Ben Ayad's banknotes and those who could began moving their silver coin to the safety of European banks. Ben Ayed was issuing paper money far beyond the value of the silver coinage the government had deposited with the bank. To bridge this gap, Ben Ayed sold licences, known as teskérés, which entitled the holder to the customs revenue from the export of olive oil. The whole enterprise rapidly became little more than a vehicle for Ben Ayed's self enrichment.

== Re-establishment in France ==
The Tunisian situation in 1852 was critical with a severe shortage of wheat after a bad harvest season as a result of the cholera epidemic. Ben Ayad travelled to Paris with the ostensible purpose of buying wheat to ease the shortage. While he was there he took the opportunity to apply for French citizenship both for himself and his colleague Khaznadar in case they incurred the anger of the Bey. Napoleon III obliged and granted him French nationality. Once he reached Paris, Ben Ayed remained there and never returned to Tunisia. At first he claimed he was unwell and needed to stay in France for treatment; the scale of his appropriation of state funds was it immediately realised; only when Nassim Shamama, in charge of the state's revenues, submitted the accounts of his former director to the Prime Minister was the truth discovered.

On becoming a French citizen Ben Ayed bought a number of properties in France to demonstrate his commitment to his new country. He made a series of purchases, notably the Collot hotel on the Quai Anatole-France in Paris (1852), Château of Épinay-sur-Seine (1853) and the Château de Bouges (1856). Among the most important of his acquisitions was the shopping gallery at the passage du Saumon in Paris, which quickly became known as the fr:Passage Ben-Aïad.

== Arbitration case ==
Ahmed Bey sought to recover as much as possible of the wealth that Ben Ayed had taken out of the country. He asked Napoleon III to act as arbitrator and head a commission charged with finding a resolution to the amounts in dispute. After two years of deliberations the Emperor announced the finding of the commission on 30 October 1856: Ben Ayed was found not to have properly discharged his duties as a director of the Dar al-Mal, and was ordered to return the banknotes he had taken out of Tunisia and to pay a sum equivalent to the value of notes he had improperly put into circulation, totalling 995,850 piastres. In addition, he was found liable for seventeen and a half million piastres, the value of fraudulent teskérés he had sold; licenses to sell olive oil to French buyers who had not in fact agreed to purchase any.

The arbitration decision did not cover all the matters in dispute, and avoided any statement of criminal wrongdoing, but the Bey of Tunis was unable to enforce it in any case and Ben Ayed did not make good any of the sums he had defrauded others of. However the Bey was able to take action where Ben Ayed's property in Tunisia was concerned. When a dispute broke out between Ben Ayed and his nephew Hamida in 1855, the Bey placed all of his property in receivership and appointed Hamida as receiver. In the eyes of the French this amounted to the arbitrary despoliation of one of their citizens of his rightful property, and the French consul in Tunisia made vigorous though ultimately futile representations with the Bey on behalf of Ben Ayed. Ben Ayed's heirs tried for many years to have this sequestration overturned, but in 1894 the court of Tunis (then under the French protectorate) dismissed their case.

== Accounts Commission ==
In 1857 the new Bey of Tunis Muhammad II ibn al-Husayn, faced with the deficits of the Tunisian treasury, set up a special commission to clear the accounts of the State. It is made up of Count Giuseppe Raffo, an Italian who served the bey as Minister of Foreign Affairs, of Mustapha Saheb Ettabaa, a former minister who enjoyed a reputation for "honesty and proverbial justice" according to Léon Roches (French consul of the period), the Bach-Kateb (the Bey's chief secretary) and general Husseïn.

Very quickly, the realisation grew that the sums Ben Ayed had embezzled were staggering: more than twenty million Tunisian piastres, almost equal to the Tunisian state debt to foreign banks or to the entire Tunisian state budget for a year and a half. The Tunisian government sent several emissaries, including Generals Husseïn and Rachid, to try to bring him back to Tunisia, but to no avail; Ben Ayed decamped to Istanbul in 1857, still with sufficient funds to buy more properties and to secure his entry into the highest level networks of influence in the Ottoman capital. Among the properties he bought was an estate in Çamlıca. He was also honoured with the Order of the Medjidie.

Meanwhile, the Accounts Commission was hampered in its work because it could not confront Mustapha Khaznadar, who until 1876 remained the most influential and powerful man in the Tunisian government. In 1876 another commission was set up by Sadok Bey because of the growing financial difficulties of the state. Chaired by Hayreddin Pasha, it highlighted the role of Khaznadar in the embezzlement of nearly two million francs and also concluded that this minister was the main instigator of the embezzlement at the time of Ben Ayed.
