= Batto Sfez Affair =

Samuel "Batto" Sfez (Arabic: باتو سفس) (Hebrew: באטו ספז) was a young Tunisian Jew who worked as a cart driver for Nassim Shamama, the caid or officially recognised leader of the Jewish community in Tunisia. His execution for blasphemy in 1857 was a test case for the status of Jews and Christians in Tunisia and of the claim of the European powers to exercise jurisdiction over non-Muslims in the country. The affair caused an international diplomatic incident and led to the granting of the first Tunisian guarantee of equal rights for all citizens, regardless of their faith.

== Background ==
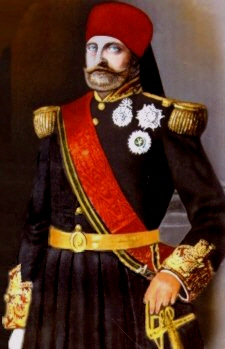
Mohammed Bey (Bey of Tunis, Tunisia)

In 1855, the new ruler of Tunis Muhammad II ibn al-Husayn, abolished many of the petty restrictions which had previously encroached on Jewish life. He also engaged Nassim Shamama as Receiver-General of Finances. At the time, relations between Tunisia and the European powers were governed by the capitulations, which granted extraterritoriality to European subjects, exempting them from Tunisian courts. The capitulations allowed the European powers to extend their protection and the shield of extraterritoriality to those working for them, but the Beys of Tunis sought to limit this narrowly. Thus Hammuda Bey (1782–1814) refused to recognise the registration of a Tuscan Jew from Livorno who had settled in Tunis as a French protégé. He argued that the Livorno Jews who had come to Tunis several generations previously were his subjects and not entitled to protection as if they were French. Nevertheless the 1824 capitulations treaty between France and Tunis stipulated that Jewish agents in the service of France would continue to benefit from those privileges which had been decided upon in former capitulations for the Tunisian ports. The extent to which France could protect a Tunisian Jew by shielding him from Tunisian justice was thus at the heart of the Batto Sfez affair. As Sfez was Tunisian born, he was not entitled to consular protection.

== Arrest, Trial and Execution ==
In 1856, Sfez was driving his master's cart through the crowded streets of Tunis when he accidentally ran over and killed a Muslim child. In the quarrel which followed, he apparently insulted Islam, which was a capital crime. There were plenty of witnesses who had heard Sfez curse his opponent and his religion, and who also testified that he was drunk at the time of the accident. With a court case underway, the Jewish community offered a very large sum of money to secure Sfez's release. However Shamama had previously incurred the Bey's displeasure by pressing him to deal with a case of a Muslim who had murdered a Jew. This had led, just a few days before Batto Sfez's arrest, to the unpopular execution of the Muslim. As a result, his representations to the Bey on behalf of his employee were unsuccessful, and instead he sought support from the French and British consuls. However Muhammad Bey issued the execution order the same day that the court issued a guilty verdict, and Sfez was summarily beheaded on 24 June 1857. His head was then kicked through the city and then smashed with stones and the authorities refused to release his body for proper Jewish burial.

In an interview with Consul Wood a few weeks after Sfez's execution, Muhammad Bey commented:

'If a rapid introduction of innovations and reforms created an apprehension that our Faith was in danger, the people would rise to a man and my government would fall... I was obliged to abide by the decision of the Sheraa (sic) (Islamic Law). Had I refused to do so the immediate consequences would have been more disastrous. Several hundred Moors inhabiting the quarter of Bab Sueka had armed themselves and were prepared, upon any hesitation on my part to carry out the sentence, to attack the Jews and Christians, two or three hundred of whom (had) taken measures for their protection. Should I have been justified to run such a risk and to expose them and myself to this direful catastrophe? In the case of a Musulman (sic) who was condemned for Blasphemy, was not my relative obliged by the ulemas and the people to sanction the sentence and sacrifice the Blasphemer in order to avoid an insurrection and the effusion of the blood of thousands? Nevertheless for six days and nights I and my Minister revolved the matter in our minds in the hope of finding means of saving the accused whose life I call God, who will judge me hereafter, to witness, I would have spared if it had been in my power.'

== International Response ==
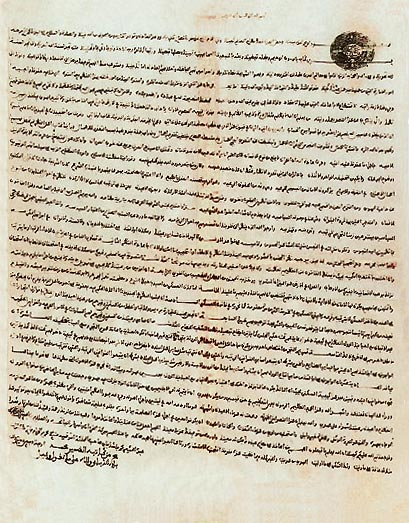
First page of 1857 Fundamental Pact

These events caused great concern to the local Jewish community as well as to European businessmen and hence the French and British consuls, Léon Roches and Richard Wood. The Jewish and Christian communities sent a delegation to the French Emperor Napoleon III urging the danger they faced. In response France sent a naval squadron of nine ships and seven hundred cannon to La Goulette to insist that Muhammad Bey promptly adopt a series of reforms modelled on the Ottoman Tanzimat.

Muhammad Bey therefore agreed to what became known as the Fundamental Pact (Arabic: عهد الأمان) ('Ahd al-Aman or Pledge of Security) drawn up by Ahmad ibn Abi Diyaf, on 10 September 1857. The Pact guaranteed people security in their lives and property, equality of taxation (thus implicitly abolishing the discriminatory jizya tax imposed on non-Muslims), religious freedom and equality before the law. It also permitted foreigners to own land, participate in all types of businesses and set up separate commercial courts.

== Variant Narratives ==
Some narratives indicate that the generally accepted account above is not complete, and add detail for which there may not be reliable sources. These include, for example, that the altercation between Batto Sfez broke out in a tavern rather than in a street, where both he and a number of Muslims were drinking. Another is that after he had been executed, the Jewish community was obliged to buy back his head, which was being used as a football by Muslims. Another still is that Sfez was lynched by a mob rather than executed by order of a court. Some narratives also omit the detail that the origin of the altercation was the killing of a Muslim child. One source claims that the reason for the French intervention was that Sfez was a French subject.

== See also ==
- History of the Jews in Tunisia
- Ottoman Tunisia
