= Godfrey Vigne =

English cricketer and traveler

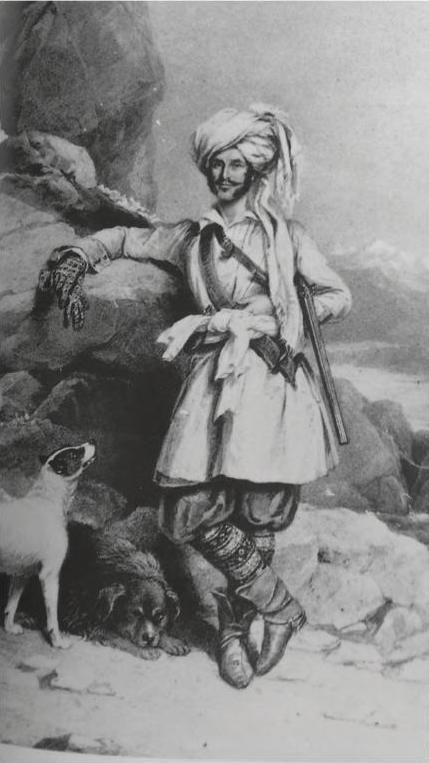
Self-portrait of Godfrey Thomas Vigne, sportsman and artist, in Baltistan in the late 1830s

Godfrey Thomas Vigne (1 September 1801 – 12 July 1863) was an English amateur cricketer and traveller.

== Early life ==
Vigne was born on 1 September 1801 at Walthamstow, then in Essex, the eldest son of Thomas Vigne. He entered Harrow School in 1817, became a barrister in 1824, and was a member of Lincoln's Inn.

== Cricketing career ==
He was mainly associated with Hampshire and he made 11 known appearances in important matches from 1819 to 1845.

== Travels ==
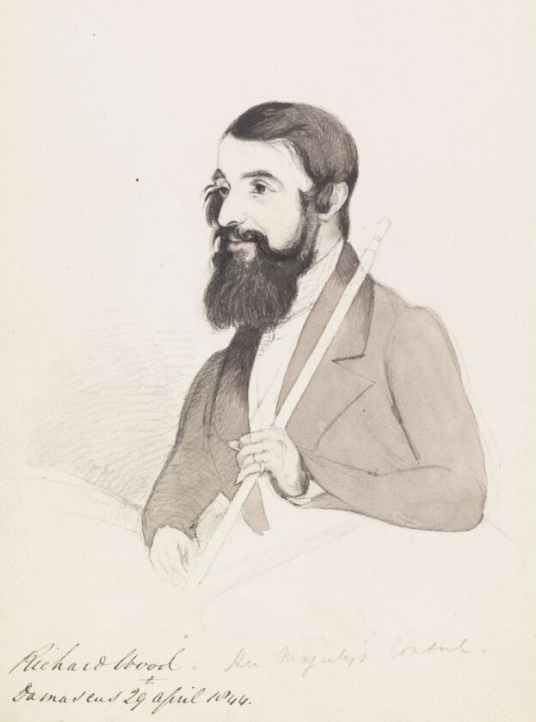
Portrait of Richard Wood, British consul in Damascus, drawn by Vigne in 1844

In 1831 Vigne left England for Persia, and then travelled to India. He spent the next seven years travelling in north west India and Central Asia. Between 1835 and 1838 he travelled extensively in Kashmir and Ladakh and was the first European known to have visited Baltistan. In the light of his ease in obtaining a permit to travel to Kashmir, despite his unofficial status, the timing and his repeated extensive journeys north of Kashmir, reaching as far as Skardu and the Saltoro Pass, it has been suggested that he may have been a spy involved in the Great Game.

In 1836 Vigne visited Afghanistan, and met the emir, Dost Mohammed. He was said to be the first Englishman to have visited Kabul. He visited the Lahore Durbar of the Sikh Empire in 1837. He was also the first to describe Nanga Parbat.

After 1852 Vigne travelled in Mexico, Nicaragua, the West Indies and the United States. He published several books describing his travels.

In 1841, the urial, a wild sheep living in Central and Southern Asia, was given the scientific name Ovis vignei in his honour. During his 1892 expedition to the Karakoram, Conway named several previously unvisited glaciers which he encountered, one of those was the Vigne Glacier.

== Works ==
- Outline of a Route Through the Panj-áb, Kábul, Kashmír, and into Little Tibet, in the Years 1834-8. Publisher: Journal of the Royal Geographical Society of London, Volume 9, 1 January 1839
- A personal narrative of a visit to Ghuzni, Kabul, and Afghanistan, and of a residence at the court of Dost Mohamed with notices of Runjit Sing, Khiva, and the Russian expedition. With illus. from drawings made by the author on the spot. Publisher: Whitacker & Co., London, 1840
- Travels in Kashmir, Ladak, Iskardo, the countries adjoining the mountain-course of the Indus, and the Himalaya, north of the Panjab. Volume I. Publisher: Henry Colburn London, 1842
- Travels in Kashmir, Ladak, Iskardo, the countries adjoining the mountain-course of the Indus, and the Himalaya, north of the Panjab. Volume II. Publisher: Henry Colburn London, 1842
- Observation on the Vegetation and Products of Afghanistan, Kaschmir and Tibet by J. Forbes Royal M.D. F.R.S.

== Gallery ==
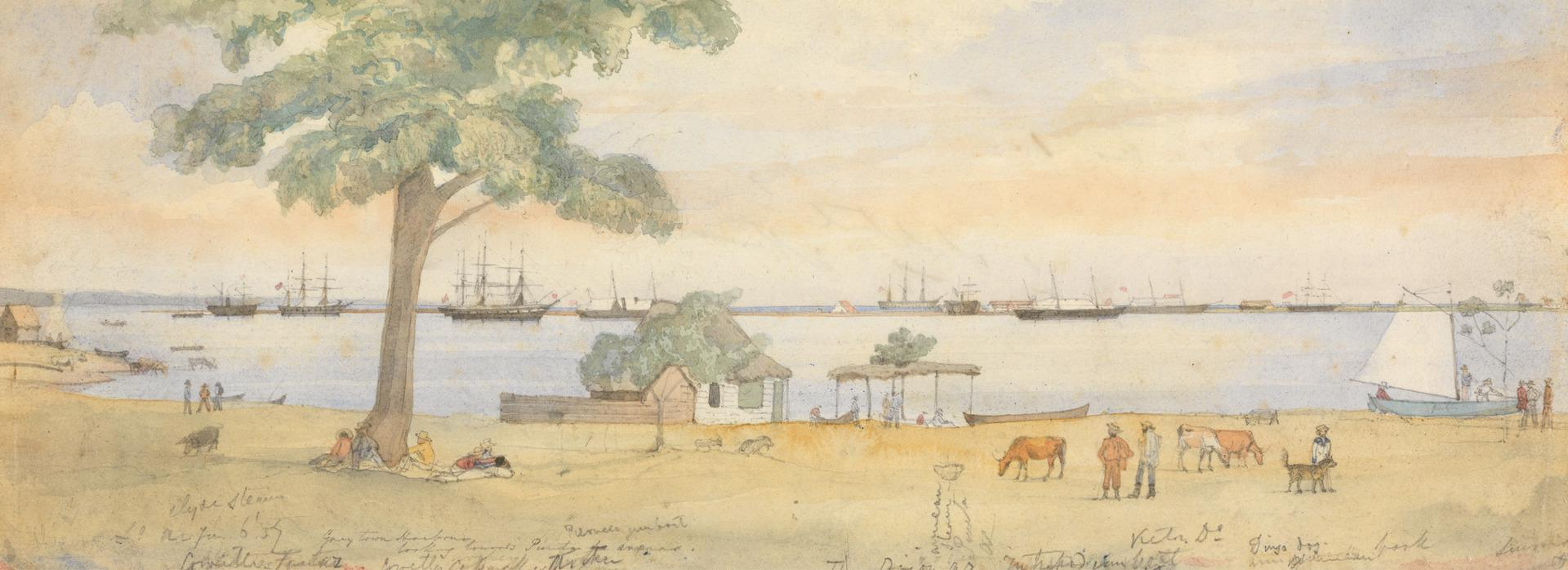
Greytown

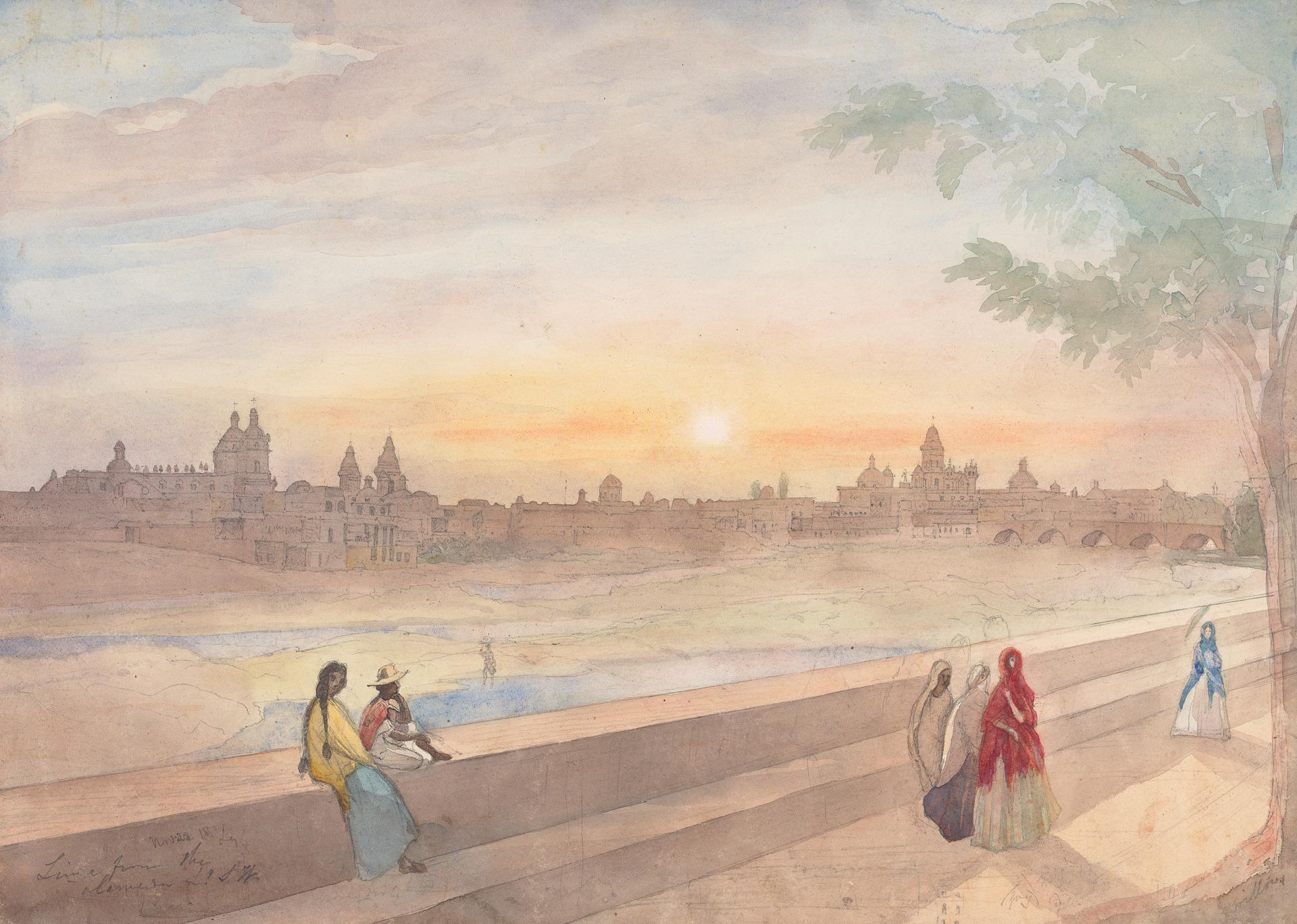
Lima

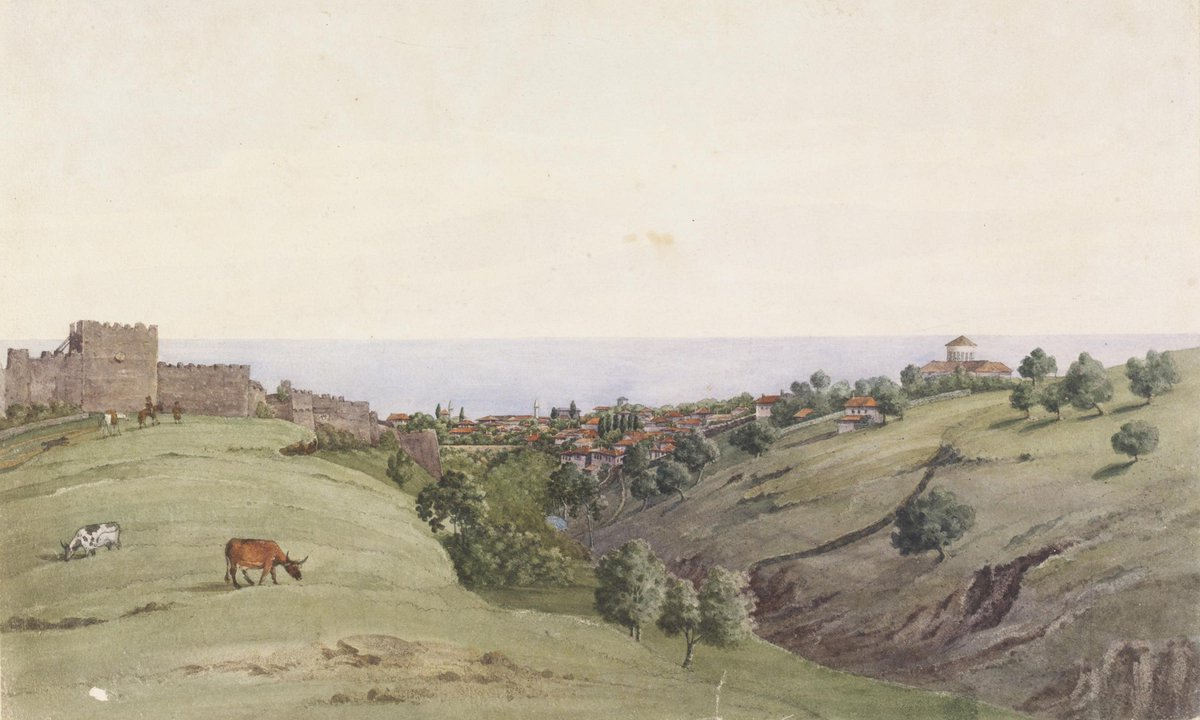
View of Trebizond from the south in 1833 by Godfrey Thomas Vigne

== External sources ==
- Media related to Godfrey Thomas Vigne at Wikimedia Commons
- Works by Godfrey Vigne at Project Gutenberg
- Vigne, Godfrey Thomas by Edward Irving Carlyle in: Dictionary of National Biography, 1885–1900, Volume 58
- Books by Godfrey Thomas Vigne at Internet Archive
- Watercolour Paintings by Godfrey Thomas Vigne in VAM Museum
