= Dar al-Mal =

Short-lived Tunisian financial institution

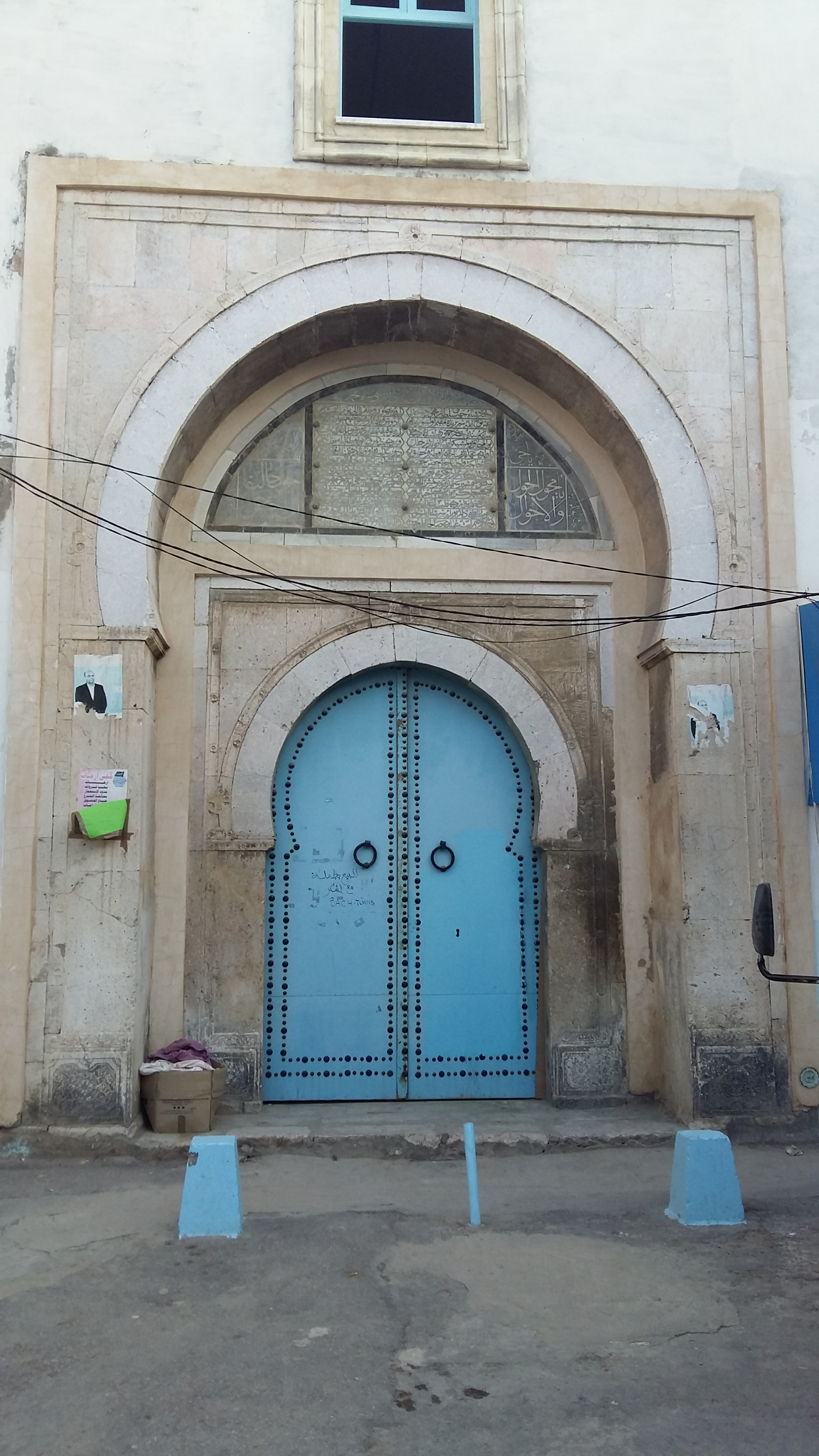
Entrance of the former Sidi Amer Barracks in Tunis, the seat of the Dar al-Mal

The Dar al-Mal (Arabic: دار المال, lit. 'House of Money') was a short-lived bank of issue in Tunis, in activity from 1847 to 1852. It was associated with the prominent role of local financier Mahmoud Ben Ayed in driving economic and financial policy for the Regency of Tunis under Bey Ahmad I ibn Mustafa. It issued the Islamic world's first-ever banknotes on the European model.

== Overview ==
The Dar al-Mal was established by Ahmad Bey as part of his European-inspired reform drive during the 1840s, which had also included the establishment of the Bardo Military Academy in 1840. Authorized by beylical decree of 7 September 1847, it was headquartered in the building known as Sidi Amer Barracks on Sidi Ali Azouz Street in the Medina of Tunis. The notes bore the seal of the Bey as well as the signature of finance minister Mustapha Khaznadar.

The issuance was initially fully covered, with reserves in specie of four million piastres for an authorization to issue notes for that same aggregate amount. In 1848, however, the Tunisian economy was hit by the ripple effects of the financial and political turmoil in Europe. The bank's activity ceased when Ben Ayed fled from Tunisia in 1852. Under Ahmad Bey's successor Muhammad II ibn al-Husayn, the Tunisian authorities sought compensation on what they alleged had been Ben Ayed's financial self-dealing during his leadership of the Dar al-Mal, what became known as the affaire Mahmoud Ben Ayed.

== See also ==
- Tanzimat
- Banque de l'Algérie
- Ottoman Bank
- State Bank of Morocco
