= Richard Wood (consul) =

British dragoman (1806–1900)

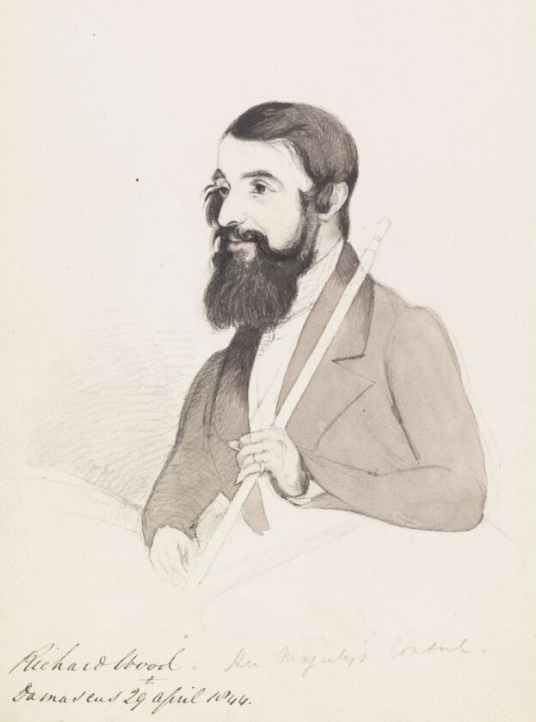
Wood, drawn in 1844 by Godfrey Thomas Vigne

Sir Richard Wood GCMG CB (1806 – 31 July 1900) was a British dragoman and consul in Constantinople, Damascus, and Tunis.

Wood's career spanned more than forty years of the Eastern question period, when the Ottoman Empire was in decline and the British were gaining power in the Middle East and North Africa. He was a key figure in Anglo-Ottoman co-operation between the 1830s and the 1870s.

== Early life ==
Wood was born in Constantinople in 1806, the son of George Wood, a British dragoman, and his wife Lucia Privileggio. He grew up there and in Exeter, where he was educated at a boarding school, leaving in 1823.

Fluent in Turkish, French, Greek, and Italian, and having a good understanding of the Ottoman Empire, Wood agreed to follow his father's career. He returned home to Constantinople soon after leaving school, and his father was able to secure a position for him with the local factory of the Levant Company as a giovane di lingua, or trainee dragoman.

Wood's mother had died in 1821. His father, who had been born in England in 1780, died in Constantinople in 1834.

Wood had a younger brother, Charles Wood, who became a physician in Smyrna and spent his life there, and also a younger sister, Mary Wood. In 1827 in Constantinople she married Niven Moore, a British Embassy cancellier, a clerk trusted with confidential documents.

== Career ==
In 1831, Wood was posted to Ottoman Syria, to learn Arabic, but with the undercover task of finding ways to undermine the government of Ibrahim Pasha of Egypt. In 1832, during the First Egyptian–Ottoman War, he went to observe the siege of Acre, where he saw Ibrahim himself in command, and reported that he had taken him at first sight for a cook.

In 1834, after Egypt had gained formal authority in Syria by the Convention of Kütahya, Wood returned to Constantinople, where he had talks with Lord Ponsonby, the British ambassador, about how Ibrahim might be brought down and the increasing Russian influence over the Ottomans undermined.

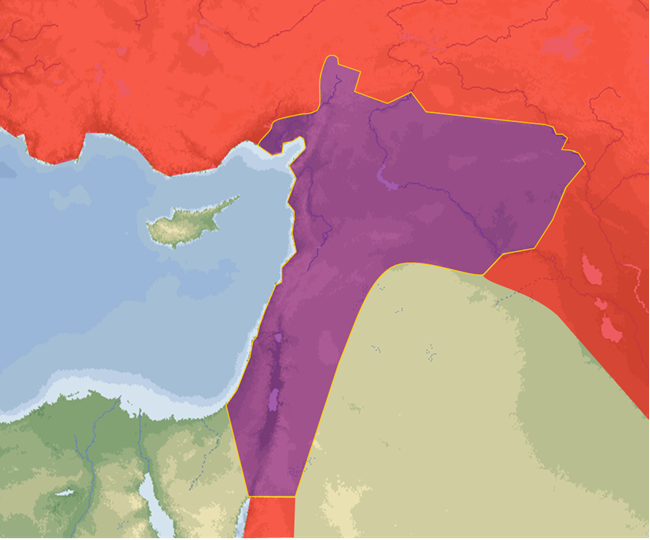
Ottoman Syria

In August 1835, during the Syrian Peasant Revolt against Ibrahim, triggered by heavy conscription and taxation, Wood returned to Syria and tried unsuccessfully to persuade Bashir Shihab II, ruler of the Mount Lebanon Emirate, to support it. He then went to Kurdistan to observe a punitive campaign by the Ottomans against the Kurdish Mir Muhammad Bey, who was supported by Russia. Wood had a series of setbacks when he went down with small-pox in Aleppo and in Mosul caught typhoid. He was also wounded in the knee by a tribesman's lance and gained a head wound which permanently damaged his eyesight. In Kurdistan, he met Muhammad, who claimed that he had never heard of England, but agreed to go to Constantinople and negotiate with the Sultan Mahmud II.

In 1840, during the Second Egyptian–Ottoman War, Wood returned to Syria, this time with both British and Ottoman instructions, in support of a revolt by the Druze and Maronites against Muhammad Ali of Egypt. A joint naval intervention by Austria, Great Britain, and the Ottomans in September 1840 led to the Ottomans regaining Syria in October, and Wood became a powerful man there. Thanks largely to him, the British had more influence in the region than any other power. In 1841, Wood was formally appointed as British consul in Damascus. He later played a significant part in the Maronite-Druze wars of 1842 and 1845.

In 1855 Wood left Syria to take up the post of British consul in Tunis. He was Consul-General in the Regency of Tunis until 1879.

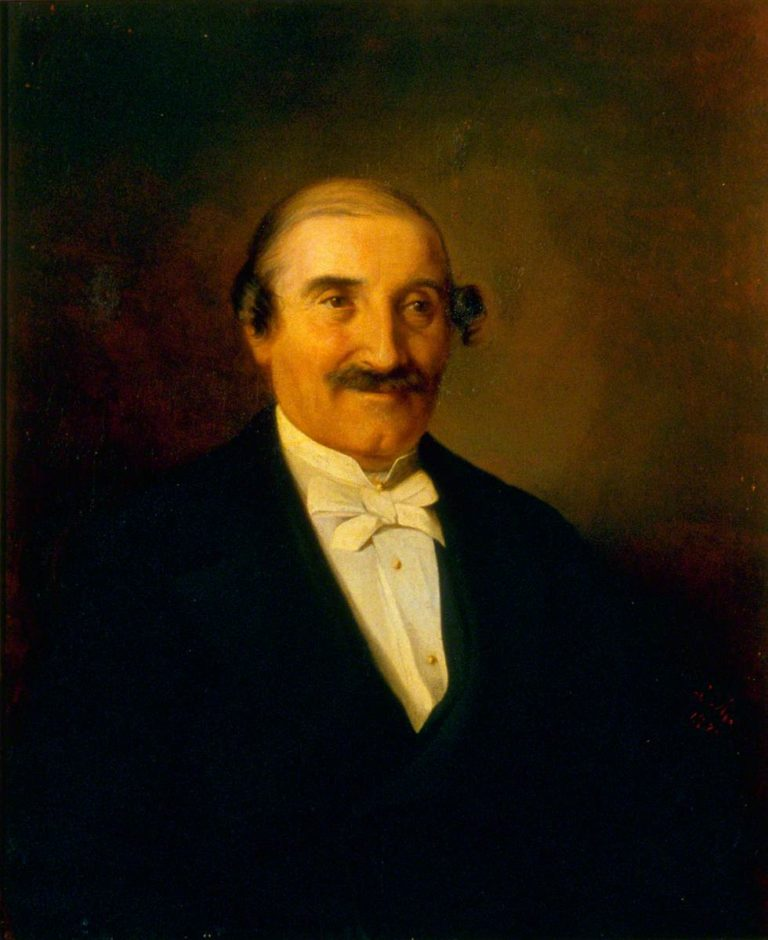
A portrait of Wood in 1877

Not long after his arrival, Wood persuaded the Bey to grant him as a Residence a partly-built house in La Marsa, near Carthage, abandoned by the fleeing Treasurer Mahmoud Ben Ayed, and to pay for it to be completed to his plans. Known as the Bourg or Bordji, the house stands in grounds of some 14 acres and is still used by British ambassadors to Tunisia.

Following the Franco-Prussian War of 1870–1871, the prestige of France was badly damaged, and both Britain and the newly unified Kingdom of Italy wished to strengthen their influence in Tunisia. The Italians failed, but Wood was more successful. To limit the influence of the French, in 1871 he was able to secure the reinstatement of Tunisia as a province of the Ottoman Empire, with the autonomy of the Beys of Tunis guaranteed.

== Honours ==
In 1865, Wood was appointed a Companion of the Order of the Bath, and in 1879 he was created a Knight Grand Cross of the Order of St Michael and St George. He was also a member of the Order of Glory of the Ottoman Empire.

== Personal life ==
On 3 August 1850, in Milltown, County Kerry, Wood married Christina Godfrey, a daughter of Sir William Godfrey, 3rd Baronet. They had a daughter, Helen Isabella, a son, Cecil Godfrey Wood (1852–1906), and a daughter Mary Leontine Wood (1862–1917), born in Algeria. In 1883, she married the future Sir Edward Wheler, 12th Baronet. The later Wheler baronets are all descended from her.

After his retirement, Wood lived in Nice, a historically Italian city in the south of France, and at Leghorn, in Italy, but also spent summers with a daughter in La Goulette, Tunisia. He died in Bagni di Lucca, a small town in Tuscany, on 31 July 1900, aged 94. His widow died in Paris on 9 March 1902, aged 72.

In 1885, Wood was reported to be a member of the Travellers Club in Pall Mall, Westminster.

== See also ==
- Batto Sfez Affair
- Tunisian Fundamental Pact of 1857
