= Or Thora Synagogue (Tunis) =

Former synagogue in Tunis, Tunisia

- Hebrew: בית הכנסת אור תורה; Arabic: كنيس أور تورا بتونس
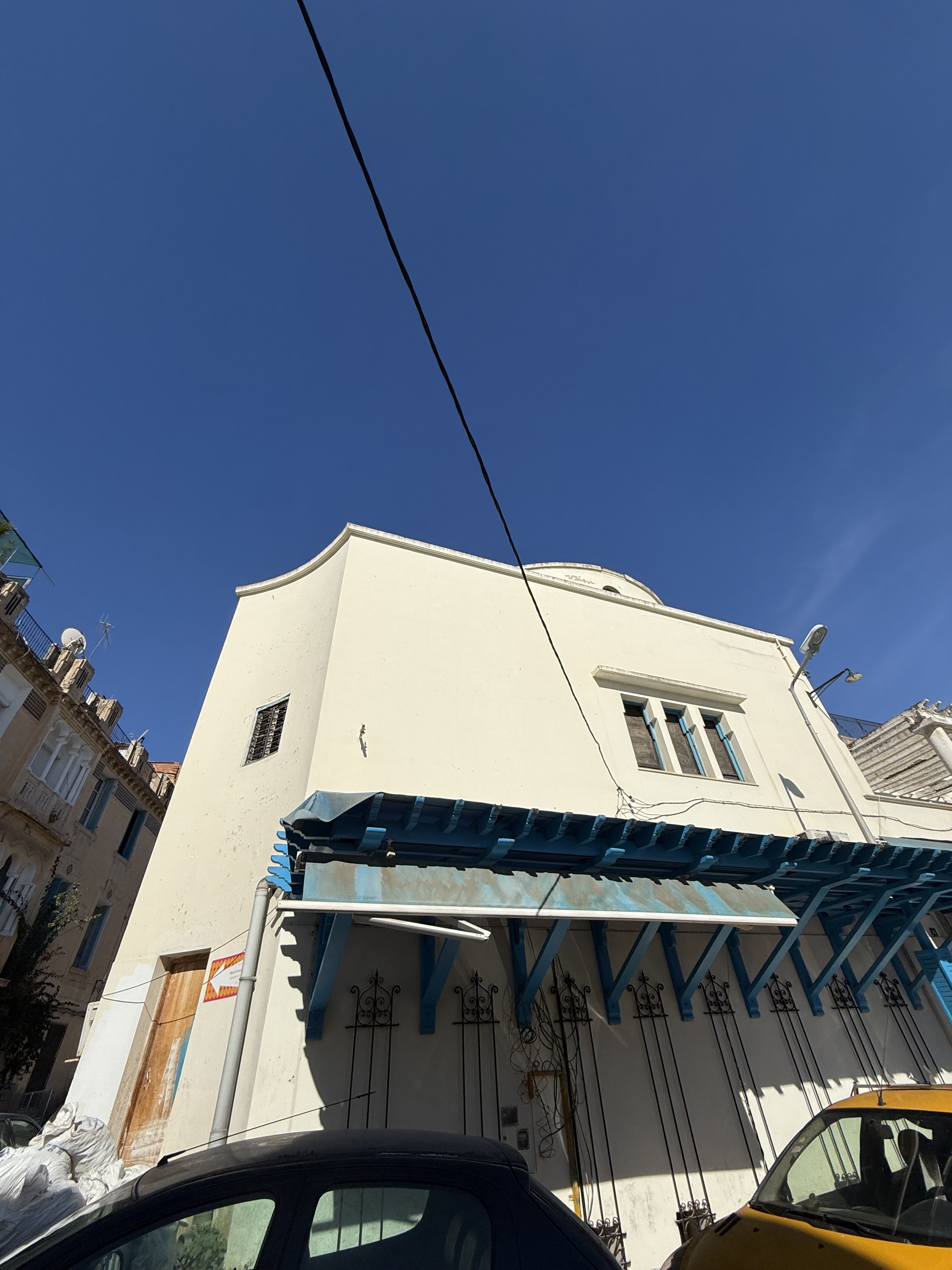
- Current look of the former synagogue, in 2025

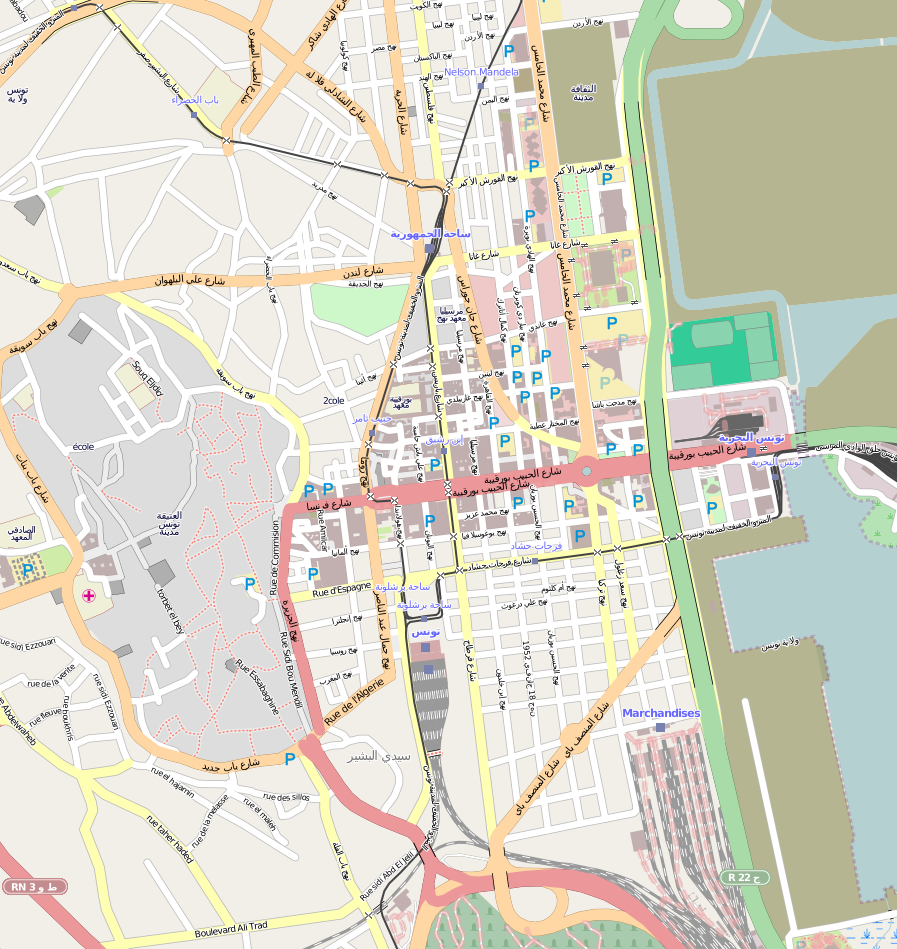
- Location of the former synagogue in Tunis

Religion
- Affiliation: Judaism (former)
- Ecclesiastical or organisational status: Synagogue (1930s–1967)
- Status: Abandoned

Location
- Location: Hara, Tunis
- Country: Tunisia
- Coordinates: 36°48′05″N 10°10′11″E

Architecture
- Architects: Aimé Krief; Jean Sebag
- Type: Synagogue architecture
- Completed: c. 1930s

The Or-Thora Synagogue (Hebrew: בית הכנסת אור תורה; Arabic: كنيس أور تورا بتونس), also erroneously called Or-Torah Synagogue, is a former Jewish congregation and synagogue, that is located in the old city of Hara, in Tunis, Tunisia. Established in the 1930s, the synagogue ceased to operate during the Six-Day War in 1967.

== History ==
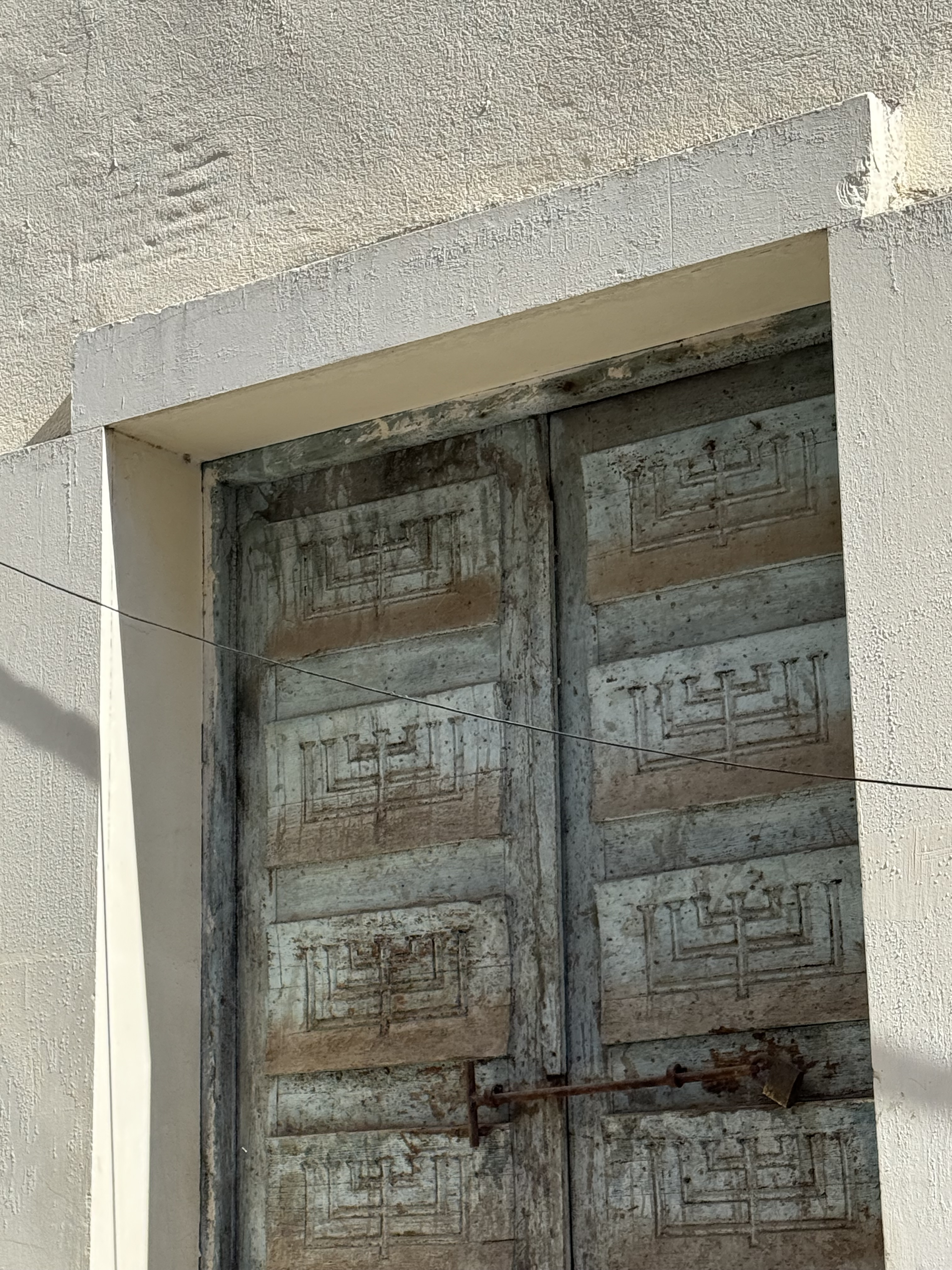
Door of former synagogue

It was completed in the early 1930s, prior to World War II. It was designed by architects Aimé Krief and Jean Sebag. Habib Bourguiba, who served as the President of Tunisia from 1957 to 1987, visited the synagogue on February 12, 1957.

=== Decline ===
After the departure of most of the Tunisian Jews for Israel and France following the anti-Jewish riots during the Six-Day War in 1967, which included the burning of the Torah Scrolls at the synagogue, religious services stopped being offered at the synagogue. It is currently not in use.

There are ongoing discussions among the Tunisian Jewish community and the residents of the Hafsia to turn the Or-Thora Synagogue into a museum of the Hara, with a project led by Leila Ben Gacem and a team of architects from the NGO Association de sauvegarde de la médina de Tunis, with the aim to save the synagogue from total degradation.

== See also ==
- History of the Jews in Tunisia
- List of synagogues in Tunisia
