= Léon Roches =

French diplomat

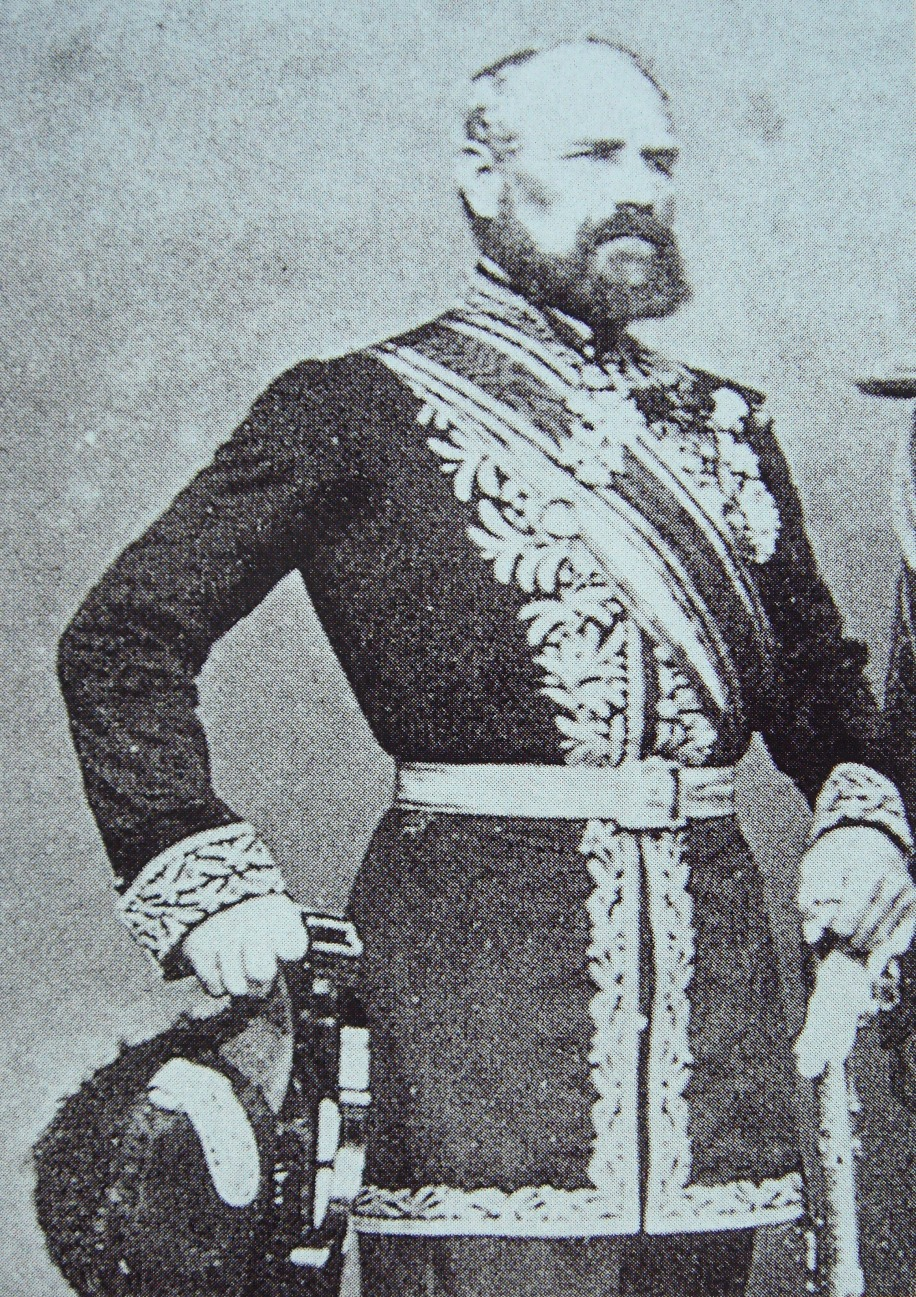
Léon Roches in c. 1865

Léon Roches (27 September 1809 – 1901) was a French diplomat. He was a representative of the French government in Japan from 1864 to 1868.

== Early life and education ==
Léon Roches was born on 27 September 1809 in Grenoble. He was a student at the Lycée Gabriel-Faure in Tournon-sur-Rhône, and followed an education in Law. After only 6 months at university, he quit to assist friends of his father as a trader in Marseille.

== North Africa ==
When Léon's father acquired a plantation in Algeria, Léon left France to join him on 30 June 1832. Léon spent the next 32 years on the African continent. He learned the Arab language very rapidly and after only two years was recruited as translator for the French Army in Africa. He served as an Officer (Sous-Lieutenant) of cavalry in the Garde Nationale d'Algerie from 1835 to 1839. General Bugeaud asked him to negotiate with Abd-el-Kader in order to bring about the cessation of hostilities against the French. He is noted as having been highly respected by Arab chieftains.

Under Bugeaud's recommendation, Roches joined the French Foreign Ministry as an interpreter in 1845. In 1846 he became Secretary of the legation in Tangier, and then took responsibilities at the French mission in Morocco.

From 1855 to 1863, Roches served as the French consul general in Tunis, Tunisia.

Using his experiences in North Africa, he wrote a book titled Trente-deux ans à travers l′Islam (Thirty-two years through Islam).

== Trieste ==
By an exceptional nomination, Roches became first-class Consul in Trieste, allowing him to acquire a strong experience in trading matters. After three years, he was appointed Consul in Tripoli. In 1855, he became Consul in Tunis. He often wore Arab dress and was renowned for his abilities with guns and horses.

== Japan ==
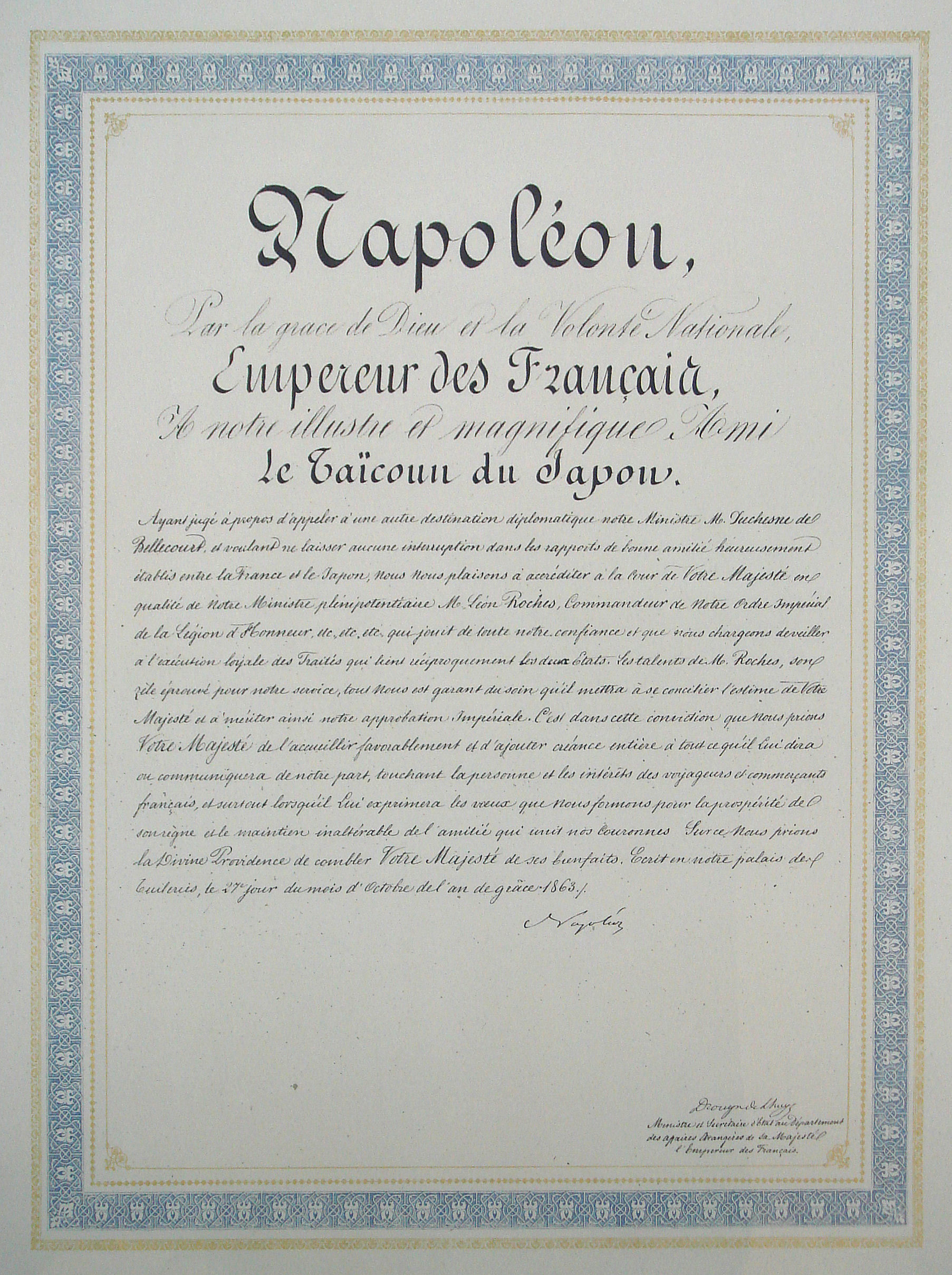
Letter of Napoleon III to the Japanese "Taikun" nominating Léon Roches, in replacement of Duchesne de Bellecourt, 23 October 1863. Diplomatic Record Office of the Ministry of Foreign Affairs (Japan).

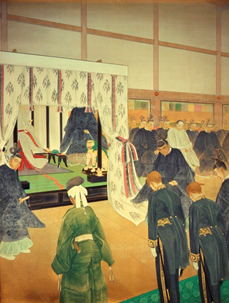
Emperor Meiji receives French Minister-Resident Roches and Dutch Minister-Resident De Graeff van Polsbroek in 1868

On 7 October 1863, Roches was nominated Consul General of France in Edo, Japan, and remained in that position until February 1868. His great rival was the British consul Harry Parkes. The French government took the side of the Tokugawa Bakufu and thus was not very popular in Japan after the Meiji Restoration. On 23 March 1868, Roches and the Dutch Minister-Resident Dirk de Graeff van Polsbroek were the first European envoys ever to receive a personal audience with the new Emperor Meiji in Edo (Tokyo).

Roches advocated the use of strength against the anti-foreign adversaries of the Shogunate. He fully supported the 1864 allied Bombardment of Shimonoseki.

Roches also helped the Shogunate modernize. He arranged for an "Ecole Franco-Japonaise" to be established, and organized the building of the Yokosuka arsenal. In 1866, he wrote to the French Minister Drouyn de Lhuys:

"The character of the Japanese essentially distinguishes them from other oriental people... We must act towards them with goodwill and dignity, critically but with justice; we can often appeal to their sentiment of honour and to the pride found among all of them, even among the lowest classes... They are gay, lively and communicative; they are disposed towards us as well as to other foreigners; whatever will be the material development of English power in this country, they run to us alone for reforms"

— Léon Roches, 1866 letter to French Minister Drouyn de Lhuys.

He left Japan on 23 June 1868, following the defeat of the Shogun's forces in the battle of Toba-Fushimi.

== See also ==
- Franco-Japanese relations
- Batto Sfez Affair
- Tunisian Fundamental Pact of 1857

Political offices
Preceded by Gustave Duchesne de Bellecourt	French Ambassador to Japan; 1864–June 1868	Succeeded by Maxime Outrey
