= Bab Cartagena =

- Arabic: باب قرطاجنة
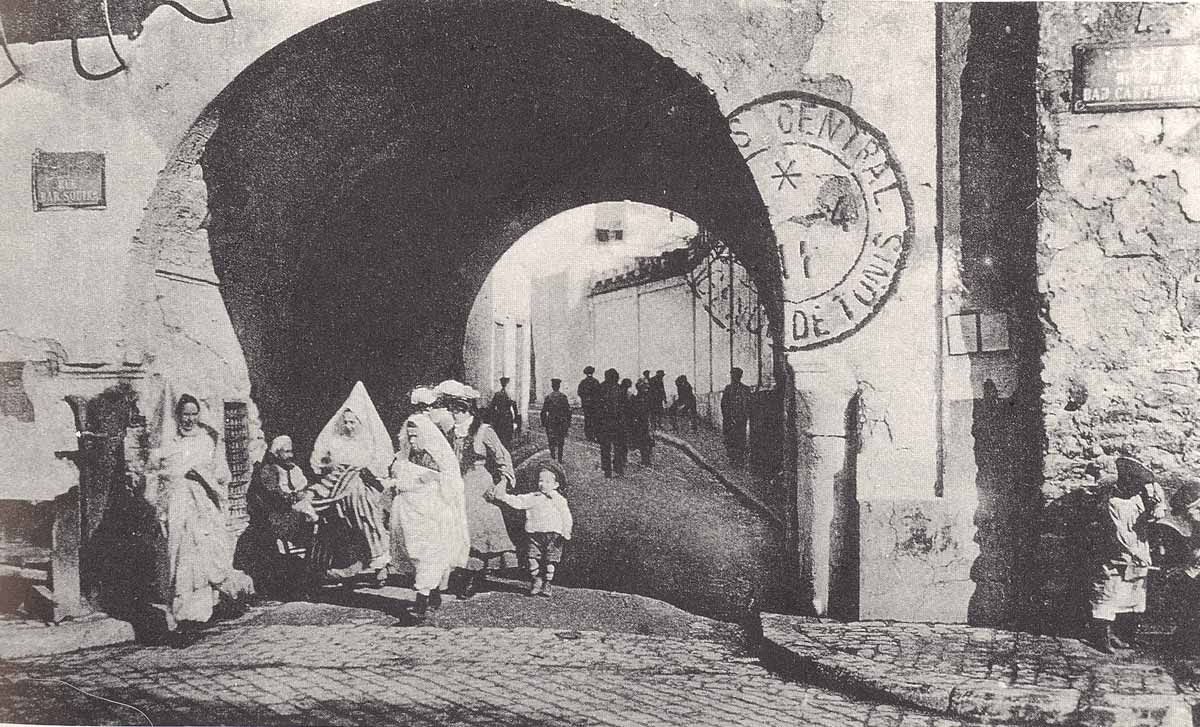
- Etymology: route to Carthage

General information
- Town or city: Tunis
- Country: Tunisia
- Coordinates: 36.803056°N 10.173222°E
- Destroyed: before 1881

Bab Cartagena (Arabic: باب قرطاجنة) or Carthage gate was one of the gates of the medina of Tunis. This gate gave an access to the road leading to Carthage. It disappeared before 1881.
