= Hara (Tunis) =

Jewish quarter in Tunis

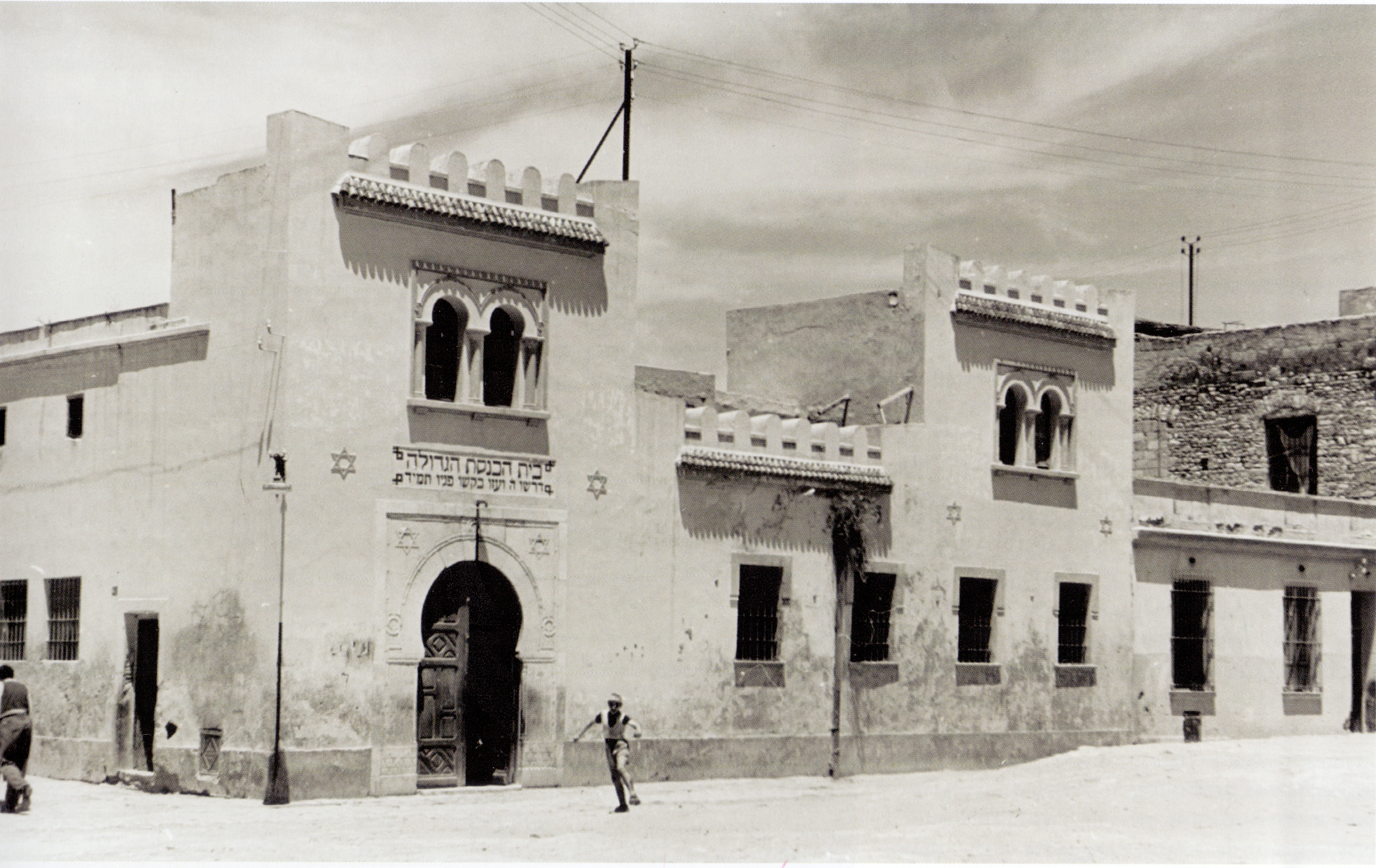
The Grand Synagogue of the Hara in 1960.

Hara (Arabic: الحارة), now referred to as Hafsia, was the Jewish quarter of the Medina of Tunis.

== Etymology ==
Hara, meaning "quarter" in the Tunisian Arabic dialect, was derived from the four Jewish families who founded the neighborhood according to local folklore. In Tunisian Arabic, ḥāra refers exclusively to Jewish neighborhoods; in Standard Arabic, the term simply means "neighborhood". The Hara of Tunis stood out from most mellahs because it did not have walls that separated the Jewish-populated area from the other areas of the Medina.

== History ==
=== Origin ===
The origins of the Hara are not very well defined. According to R. Bonquero Voligny, the Jews had no right to spend the night in the Medina of Tunis until the 12th century. They had to go out every day before the doors closed and take shelter in the outskirts of the city, especially in the village of Mellassine. This made them vulnerable to robbery by looters.

=== Sidi Mahrez ===
According to legend, the Jews requested the intervention of Sidi Mahrez to convince the Bey to allow them to settle inside the Medina and protect themselves. For this purpose, they made two damascened daggers in gold and offered one of them to the Bey as a sign of respect and admiration. Then the rabbi who led the delegation to meet the Bey told him that there was a copy in Constantinople, and that Sidi Mahrez, a faithful servant of the Bey, could bring it back with the help of his magical powers. In the meantime, the Jews implored Sidi Mahrez to play along and bring the dagger to the Bey, then to ask, as a reward, for the admission of hara (four) Jewish families inside the Medina. The wali accepted and managed to convince the Bey to agree. Since Jewish families were numerous and widespread, under this agreement all the people who lived in Mellassine managed to enter.

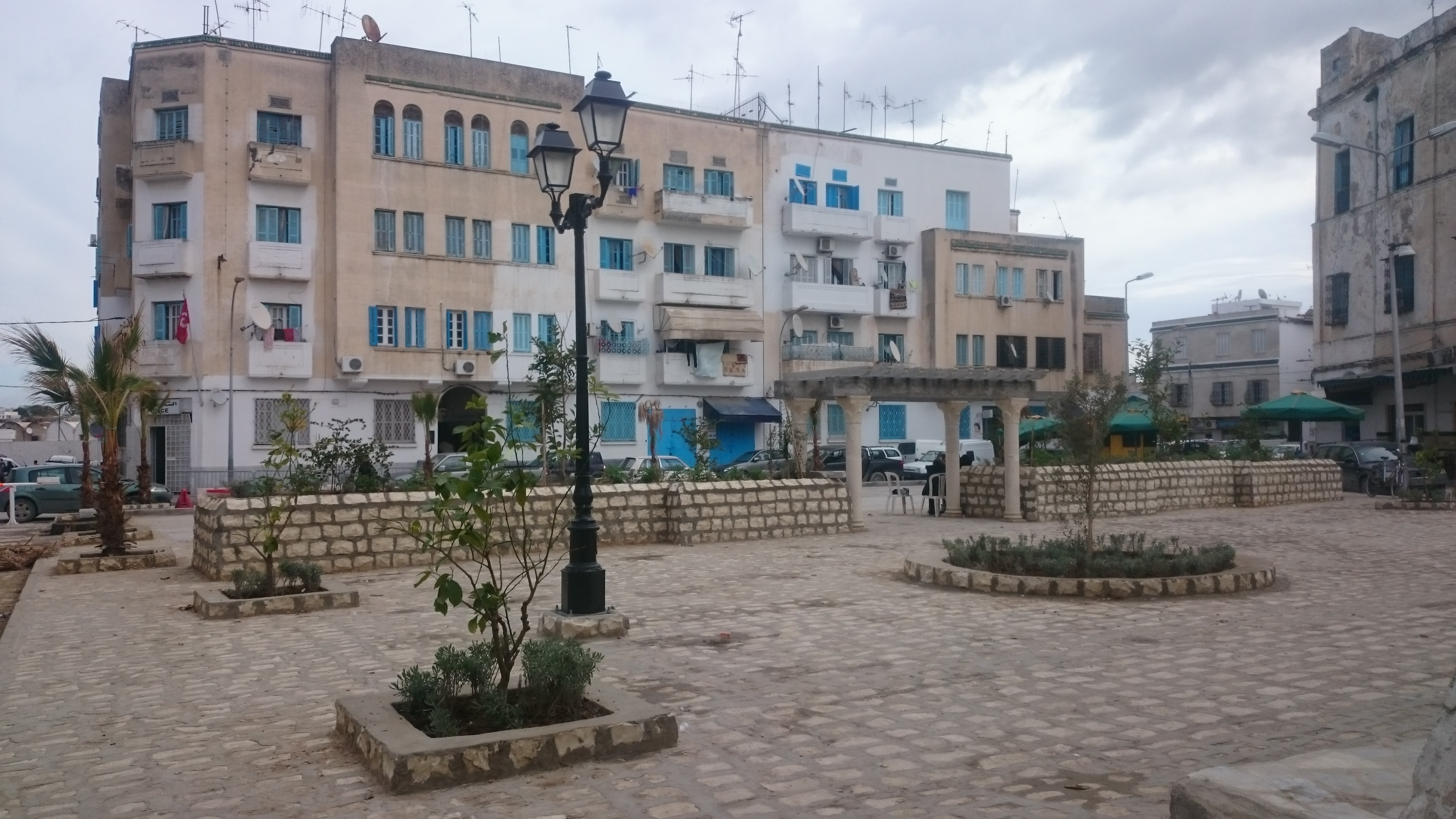
The Hara, currently called Hafsia.

In order to choose the best location for the new quarter, the Bey asked Sidi Mahrez to throw his stick from the top of the minaret in the direction of the suburb of Bab Souika. The Jews built their first intramural dwellings in the history of Tunis where the stick fell.

== Decline and Restoration ==
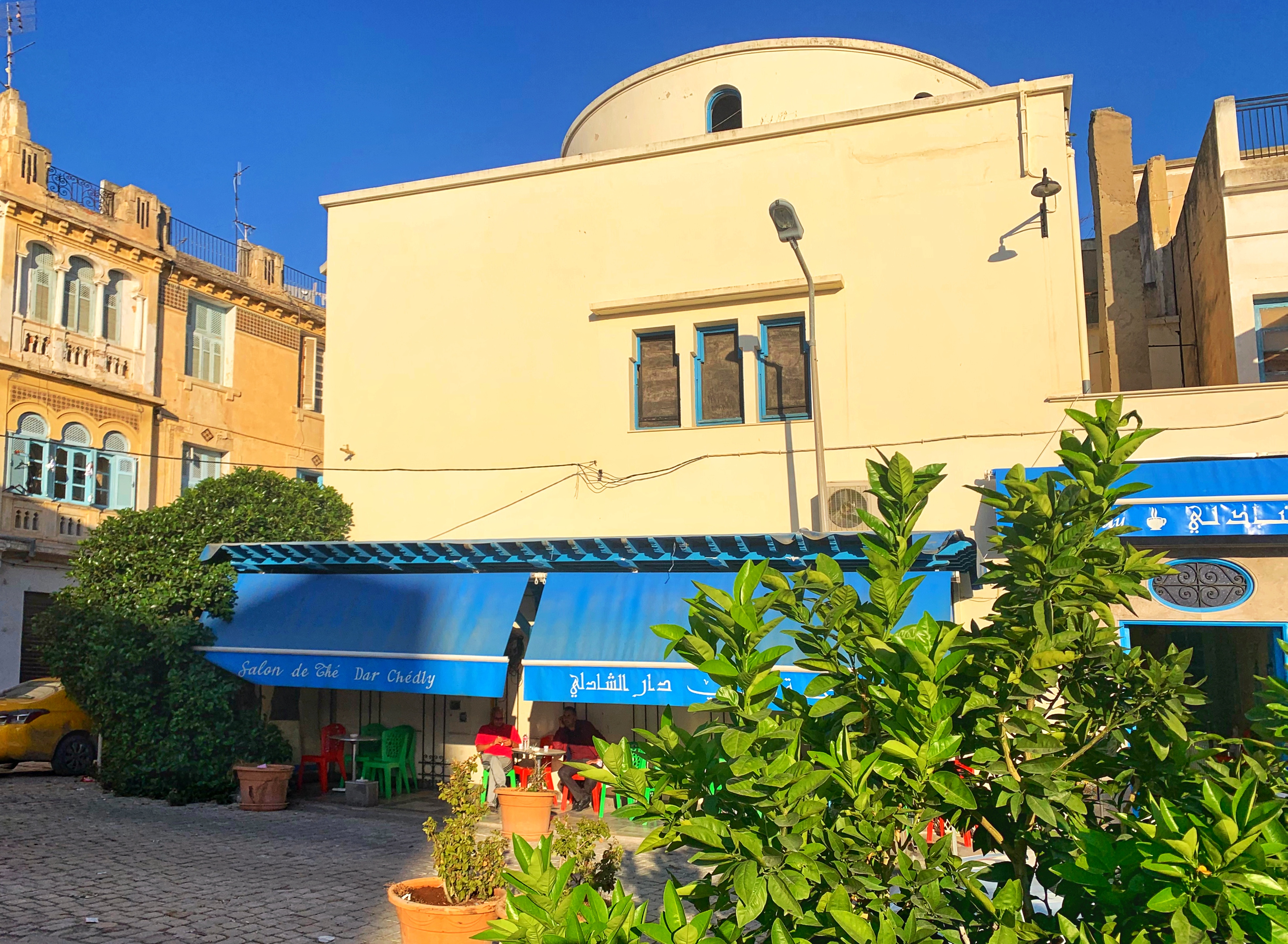
Or-Thora Synagogue

The Jewish community of Tunis resided in the Hara from the 13th century until they began moving from the Medina to La Goulette during the French Protectorate of Tunisia. It underwent a long process of rehabilitation, which began in the 1930s and continued after the Independence of Tunisia in 1956. According to the 1956 census, the Hara had 11,258 inhabitants, 7,638 of which were Jews. There are plans among the residents to restore the Or-Thora Synagogue, and convert it into a Jewish museum.

== See also ==
- Or-Thora Synagogue (Tunis)
- Sla El-Kebira Synagogue
- Slat Freiha Synagogue
- History of the Jews in Tunisia
