= Tunisian Fundamental Pact of 1857 =

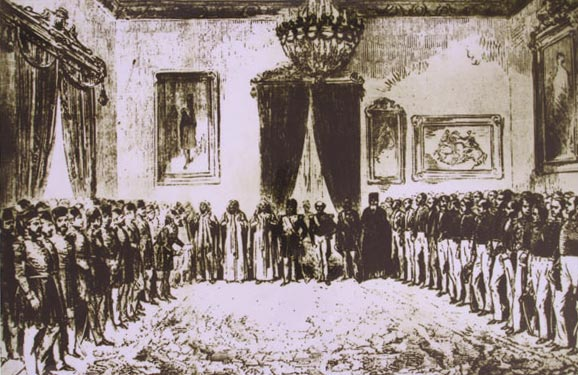
Ceremony of promulgation of the Fundamental Pact on 10 September 1857. From left to right: the caids, generals and senior officials, Ibn Abi Dhiaf reading the proclamation, the two bach-muftis of the regency, Mohammed Bey and his grand vizier, then the diplomatic corps.

The Tunisian Fundamental Pact of 1857 (Arabic: عهد الأمان, romanized: 'Ahd al-Amān, lit. 'Security Covenant'), envisaged as early as 1856, is a declaration of the rights of the subjects of the Bey of Tunis and of all the inhabitants living in the Beylicat of Tunis promulgated by Muhammad II ibn al-Husayn on 10 September 1857. This pact brought revolutionary reforms: it proclaimed that all the inhabitants of the regency were equal before the law and before taxes, established freedom of worship and trade and above all gave foreigners the right to access property and exercise all professions. This pact de facto abolished the status of dhimmi for non-Muslims. The pact was translated into Hebrew language in 1862 and was then the first non-religious document to be translated into this language in Tunisia. Among the people who contributed to this project, we can name Mardochée Tapia, Moïse Samama and Elie El Malikh.

== History ==
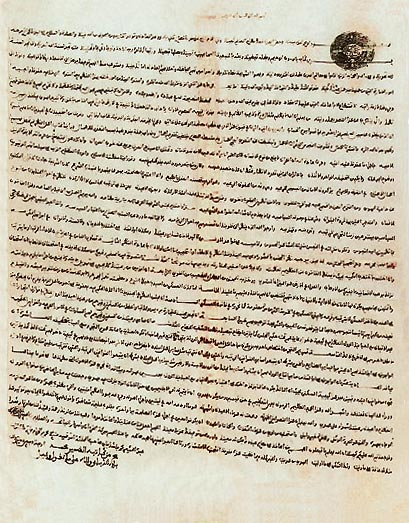
First page of the Fundamental Pact of 1857.

At the advent of Ahmad I ibn Mustafa, the regency of Tunis wanted to engage in a process of both modernization and independence from the Ottoman Empire. He modernized the army by creating the Bardo Military Academy in March 1840, founded the same year the industrial drapery of Tebourba, tanneries, a cannon foundry in Le Bardo, gunpowder mills and a flour mill in Djedeida, just as he abolished slavery in 1846 and formed a modern government with ministers for the important functions of the regency. He invested in a mint and in the construction of the Mohamedia Palace, which would be the cause of the ruin of the state coffers. All these very costly reforms pushed Ahmed Bey and his Minister of Finance, Mustapha Khaznadar, to contract loans by accepting often usurious rates which caused the debt to swell.

When Muhammad II ibn al-Husayn succeeded his cousin Ahmed on 30 May 1855, he inherited Mustapha Khaznadar as Grand Vizier and surrounded himself with competent ministers, such as Hayreddin Pasha or Generals Hussein and Rustum, and devoted advisors, such as Mohamed Bayram IV and Mahmud Qabadu. The Bey had no intention of reforms but the accumulation of circumstances favored this project: on the one hand the risk of an uprising of the population because of a new tax, the Mejba, on the other hand the reformist wishes of Hayreddin Pasha, Ahmad ibn Abi Diyaf, Bayram IV and Mahmud Qabadu, and especially the threat of the French navy squadron, stationed at La Goulette under the command of Admiral François Thomas Tréhouart, to satisfy the requests of the consuls of France and the United Kingdom concerning the reforms demanded following the Batto Sfez Affair.

At the end of the Crimean War, Europe imposed liberal reforms on the Ottoman Empire through the provisions of the Ottoman Reform Edict of February 1856. Mohammed Bey's position having become fragile following the aforementioned circumstances, the French consul Léon Roches and the British consul Richard Wood took advantage of this to serve the interests of their respective governments, and those of Europeans in general, by imposing on the bey the institution of a liberal and constitutional regime in place of the absolute monarchy. The Fundamental Pact of 1857 was inspired by the Ottoman charters of 1839 and 1856. It reproduced very exactly the Edict of Gülhane in Gülhane Park, proclaimed in 1839 by the Ottoman dynasty, and which Ahmed Bey had already refused to apply on his territory.

== Proclamation ==
On 9 September 1857, in the Throne Room of the Bardo Palace, and before an imposing assembly of all the dignitaries of the country, foreign consuls, Qaids and Mamluks, Mohammed Bey proclaimed the Fundamental Pact, reminding his subjects and the dignitaries of the regency that these reforms were dictated by reason and nature, while obeying the Charaâ. He announced above all that the pact had been drafted after consultation with the muftis and the great European powers.

The reading of the text was done by Ahmad ibn Abi Diyaf, who had been assigned the task of drafting the text. The Fundamental Pact opens with a preamble combining a call to witness from God and an explanation of the sovereign's choices by the constraints linked to reason and nature: "God is witness that I accept his high prescriptions to prove that I prefer the happiness of my States to my personal advantage." The pact ends with the following oath: "We commit ourselves, not only in our name, but also in the name of all our successors; none of them will be able to reign until they have sworn to observe these liberal institutions. We call to witness, before God, this illustrious assembly composed of the representatives of the great friendly powers, and the high officials of our government". After reading it, the Bey swears fidelity to the text and invites the officials and officers present to take the same oath. Copies of this charter are sent to the European courts. In November of the same year, and with the aim of drawing up a real Constitution, Mohammed Bey, appoints a commission headed by his grand vizier Mustapha Khaznadar, which will give birth to the Constitution of 1861.

== Principles ==
The Fundamental Pact consists of eleven articles that are situated on two levels, that of principles (security, equality and freedom) and that of the rights of foreigners in the regency. They stipulate:

1. freedom of conscience and security of worship;
2. complete security of all subjects: security of persons, property and honour;
3. equality of all subjects of the bey before taxes;
4. equality of subjects before the law;
5. the principle of conscription drawn by lot;
6. the appointment of Jewish assessors for criminal courts, when the accused is Jewish;
7. the principle of a commercial court;
8. equality between Muslims and non-Muslims in the application of regulations;
9. freedom of trade for all and the prohibition on the government engaging in it;
10. freedom for foreigners to practice all trades provided they submit to the laws of the country in this matter;
11. the right for foreigners to acquire real estate.

== Beneficiaries ==
The first three articles confirm the ideals of the French Revolution. Four articles (1st, 2nd, 3rd and 5th) are of direct interest to Tunisian Muslim subjects while two articles (4th and 6th) specifically concern Jews. The last five articles, imposed by the French consul Léon Roches and the gunboat diplomacy, deal directly with European interests in the regency and are only explicit economic privileges for French merchants. The Europeans derive the greatest benefit from this pact, having obtained the right to acquire real estate, something that had previously been forbidden to them. However, the pact is nonetheless an event that has repercussions on Tunisian political life, more by its spirit no doubt than by its letter.

== Consequences ==
Considering this act as a stroke of political genius, Napoleon III awarded the Grand Cordon of the Legion of Honor with diamond insignia to Mohammed Bey. Léon Roches presented him with this decoration during an imposing ceremony at the Bardo Palace on 3 January 1858. On 17 September 1860 in Algiers, Napoleon III awarded Muhammad III as-Sadiq, brother and successor of Mohammed Bey, the Grand Cordon of the Legion of Honor after he received from the latter a magnificently bound volume of the Fundamental Pact as well as the text of the new Constitution, which came into force on 26 April 1861 but was suspended in 1864 due to public unrest linked to the insurrection led by Ali Ben Ghedhahem.
