= Mahmud Qabadu =

Mahmud Qabadu (1812–1872) of Tunisia, also Muhammad Qabadu, was a scholar of Quranic studies, a progressive member of the ulama, a long-time professor at the Zaytuna mosque academy, and a poet. Shaykh Mahmūd Qabādū served as a qadi to the chief judge and latter as mufti in Tunis.

== Life and career ==
When he was young, Mahmud Qabadu left Tunisia to study at a sufi center in Tripolitania, that of the Madaniyya tarika, a branch of the Darqawa. Eventually he traveled to Istanbul. There he became associated with the leading jurist 'Arif Bey, who was the shaykh al-Islam (Turkish: seyhul-islam), and who was also a partisan of the Tanzimat reforms then at issue in the Ottoman Empire.

In 1842 the Tunisian ruler Ahmed Bey, himself a reformer, sent his private secretary (probably Bin Diyaf) to Istanbul in order to offer Mahmud Qabadu a post at the new Bardo Military Academy (al-Maktab al-Harbi) in Tunis. Qabadu accepted and returned to Tunis, becoming professor of Arabic and Islamic studies. For many years he taught as "one of the most preeminent teachers" not only at the Bardo, but also at the Zitouna Mosque-University in Tunis. At Zitouna, Mahmud Qabadu and others molded its educational development along the lines of Islamic reform.

The governmental and social changes initiated under Ahmed Bey stamped the era as one of modernizing reform in Tunisia. Qabadu became an important insider of the reforming "party," led by the bey's minister, Khair al-Din. These reforms continued under the next two rulers, Muhammad Bey and Sadok Bey. The overall nineteenth-century reform era, including Qabadu's significant contributions, formed a historic platform for the construction of further republican reforms after independence.

During the course of his career, Shaykh Madmud Qabadu served in the shari'a judiciary as qadi to the chief judge at the Bardo. After 1868, Qabadu at Tunis was mufti of the Maliki rite (or Maliki 'school of law'). As one "of the earliest and most respected of Tunisia's religious reformers" and while serving as mufti, Qabadu, a "devout mystic," also continued as a sufi leader.

== Qabadu's writing ==
An early advocate of teaching modern science, circa 1850 Qabadu authored a treatise discussing the key role such technical learning played in enabling overall European strength (see also: Islamic modernism). Science was not forbidden to Muslims, he wrote, articulating a position that legitimized foreign borrowing for orthodox Islam. His treatise was published, serving as the introduction to a French text on military science, which had been translated into Arabic for the Bardo Military Academy.

Beginning in 1860, Qabadu became a "key member" on the editorial staff of Tunisia's new and only newspaper, the bey's official gazette Ra'id Rasmi. Later, Qabadu as an ulama notable himself became the subject of a study published in Tunisia during the 1870s. Qabadu also wrote verse and enjoyed being "acclaimed as a leading poet." Among his works are translations of European texts and military treatises into Arabic.

== Political reformer ==
The 19th-century reform era in Beylical Tunisia was celebrated, although scholars debate the exact nature of its impacts and outcomes. From its efforts arose "a new political consciousness in Tunis" embodied by "a group of reforming statesmen, officials, and writers." Historian Albert Hourani says:

"This group had two origins: one of them was the Zaytuna mosque, the seat of the traditional Islamic learning, where the influence of a reforming teacher, Shaykh Muhammad Qabadu, was felt; the other was the new School of Military Sciences, established by Ahmed Bey, with [foreign] teachers, and the same Shaykh Qabadu as teacher of Arabic and the religious sciences."

From among this reformist group, historians typically remember Khair al-Din as the most creative and effective politician. He served as government minister and led a small group of like-minded officials. Khair al-Din, who was a student of Shaykh Qabadu, was aware of the sharp relevance to Tunisia of Ottoman state reforms then being contested in Istanbul.

Mahmud Qabadu had experienced firsthand the practical workings of the Tanzimat reform movement in Ottoman society while living in Istanbul. Thus he provided a personal link to the Ottoman political experience in Tunisia. The reform in Tunisia was primarily the work of politicians, notably as mentioned the mamluk Khair al-Din (c. 1820–1890) who at one point served as Grand Vizier (1873–1877). Yet significant members of the ulama and other scribal traditions were known to favor a transformation of Tunisian society, and to make contributions to the changes, witness Mahmud Qabadu and also Bin Diyaf (1802–1874) and Muhammad Bayram (1840–1889).

"Qabadu and Khayr al-Din collaborated closely in the critical matter of reform; that a mamluk became an intellectual intimate of a prestigious member of the religious establishment constitutes an index of profound shifts. Khayr al-Din's ardor for education was a product of his frequent interactions with Qabadu and other Tunis scholars... ."

When the conservative Muhammad Bey ascended the throne in 1855, he staged notable opposition to reformist change. "A sort of cold war between reformers, with Qabadu and Khair al-Din, and the conservatives came into being." Yet later the new bey became "convinced by some Zaytuna supporters of reform that the country had to be reorganized."

Khair al-Din led "the 'constitutional movement' that included luminaries such as Qabadu, Bayram V, bu Hajib, and Abi Diyaf, amongst a small group of reform-minded and Western-inspired figures. The 1861 constitution, the Muslim world's first such document, the legislative council and the civic bodies created on its basis all had the support of Khayr al-Din and his co-reformers."

Shaykh Qabadu with other reformist ulama, here especially Salim Bu Hajib and Muhammad Bayram (V), provided assistance to Khair al-Din when he wrote his treatise discussing the Islamic orthodoxy of reform and advocating its pursuit, Aqwam al masalik (Tunis 1867). This included research and editing.

"It must be added here that Khair al-Din was influenced a great deal in his views by Muhammad Qabadu, the great Tunisian thinker of the 19th century, with whom he worked at the Academy.

Accordingly, Mahmud Qabadu played a key role in the modernizing reforms and "institution-building" that proceeded through the contributions of a small band of officials, as generally led by Khair al-Din. These 19th-century reforms under the Beys, in which strategic alliances were formed linking the ulama of Zaytuna with politicians serving the state, would later provide a basis in social history for mid-20th-century developments in Tunisia.

== See also ==
- "Major Reforms" (in main historical article Beylik of Tunis)

== Bibliography ==
- Julia A. Clancy-Smith, Mediterraneans. North Africa and Europe in an Age of Migration (University of California 2011).
- Arnold H. Green, The Tunisian Ulama 1893–1915. Social structure and response to ideological currents (Leiden: E. J. Brill 1978).
- Albert Hourani, Arabic Thought in the Liberal Age 1798–1939 (Oxford University 1962, 1967).
- Ahmad ibn Abi Diyaf, Consult Them in the Matter. A nineteenth-century Islamic argument for constitutional government, translated with introduction and notes by L. Carl Brown (University of Arkansas 2005).
- Abdallah Laroui, L'Histoire du Maghreb: Un essai de synthèse (Paris: Librairie François Maspero 1970), translated as The History of the Maghrib. An interpretive essay (Princeton University 1977).
- Brieg Powel and Larbi Sadiki, Europe and Tunisia. Democratisation via association (London: Routledge 2010).
- J. Spencer Trimingham, The Sufi Orders in Islam (Oxford University 1971).
- Nicola A. Ziadeh, Origins of Nationalism in Tunisia (American University of Beirut 1962).

== See also ==
- Ahmed Bey
- Khair al-Din
- Ibn Abi Diyaf
- Muhammad Bey
- Sadok Bey
