= Abraham Hagège =

19th centuryTunisian rabbi

- Died: 27 September 1880 Tunis, Beylik of Tunis, Ottoman Empire

Religious life
- Religion: Judaism
- Position: Chief Rabbi of Tunis
- Began: 1874
- Ended: 1880

Abraham Hagège (Hebrew: אברהם חג׳אג׳; died 27 September 1880) was a Tunisian rabbi, who served as Chief Rabbi of Tunis from 1873 to 1880. After his death Israel Zeitoun of Tunis and Aaron ben Simon of Jerusalem published his notes on most of the treatises of the Babylonian Talmud under the title Zar'o shel Abraham (Jerusalem, 1884).

== Publications ==
- Zar'o shel Abraham (in Hebrew). Jerusalem: Elhanan Temimbaum. 1884.
