= Tunisian Constitution of 1861 =

- Created: 26 April 1861
- Ratified: 26 April 1861
- Date effective: 30 April 1861
- Location: Tunisia
- Purpose: To replace the Tunisian fundamental Pact of 1857

The Tunisian Constitution of 1861 came into force on 26 April 1861. It succeeded the Fundamental Pact granted on 10 September 1857 by the sovereign Muhammad II ibn al-Husayn.

== Provisions ==
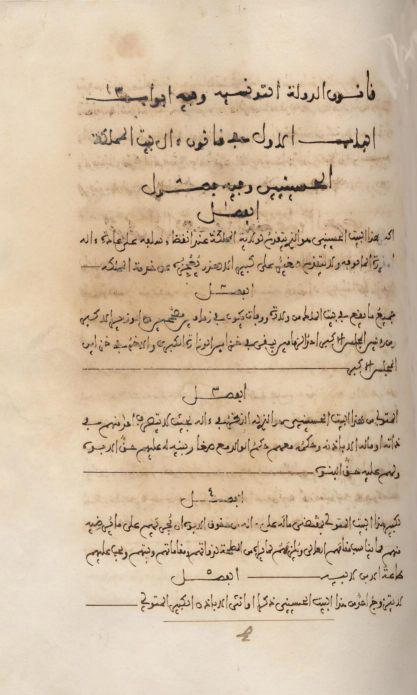
First page of the Constitution of 1861.

The text, submitted on 17 September 1860 by Muhammad III as-Sadiq, successor of Muhammad II ibn al-Husayn, to Emperor Napoleon III in Algiers, contains a total of 114 articles. It establishes a sharing of power, between an executive power composed of the bey and a Prime Minister, a legislative power with important prerogatives — entrusted to an oligarchic-type Supreme Council — and an independent judicial power. Guardian of the Constitution, the legislative power endowed with sovereign authority can depose the bey in the event of unconstitutional acts, thus favoring the participation of elites in the management of affairs2. In addition, the sovereign is no longer free to dispose of the resources of the State and must receive a civil list of 1,200,000 piastres while the princes of his family receive pensions provided for in the text.

== Oppositions ==
Khalifa Chater notes, however, that the issues of national representation and election are forgotten; Ahmad ibn Abi Diyaf notes that the list of notables designated as members of the Supreme Council is formed almost exclusively of personalities born abroad, thus consecrating the monopoly of the Mamluks on political life.

Also this Constitution is poorly received by a part of the population because, in addition to giving more power to the Mamluks, it leads to other unpopular measures such as general conscription, the creation of new courts and concessions made to foreigners in matters of property law. The increase in public spending generated by the new institutions and numerous public works led to an increase in the mejba in September 1863 — extending it to several cities, civil servants, the military and previously exempted ulama — then to an insurrection led by Ali Ben Ghedhahem from April 1864, the crisis being aggravated by embezzlement and the deterioration of economic conditions. The Constitution was then suspended from the first days of the revolt, which was finally repressed.

== Legacy ==
She subsequently retained a symbolic power by becoming the reference of the Tunisian national movement, in the fight against the French protectorate, particularly within the Destour whose first demand was its restoration with however certain developments, the most notable being the election of 60 of the 70 members of the Supreme Council. The Neo Destour was not left behind in displaying its desire to establish "a democratic government from the people and enjoying the confidence of the Tunisian masses".
