= Ouichka Mosque =

Mosque in Tunis, Tunisia

- مسجد ويشكة

Religion
- Affiliation: Islam
- Branch/tradition: Sunni

Location
- Location: Tunis, Tunisia

Architecture
- Type: Mosque

Ouichka Mosque (Arabic: مسجد ويشكة), is a Tunisian mosque located in the north of the medina of Tunis. It does not exist anymore.

== Localization ==
The mosque was located in Ibn Abi Dhiaf Street.

== Etymology ==
Ouichka is a Spanish word that refers to a Tunisian family with Andalusian origins.

== History ==
It was built after the arrival of the Andalusians.
