= Hayreddin Pasha =

Ottoman-Tunisian statesman and reformer (c.1820–1890)

Khayreddin Pasha
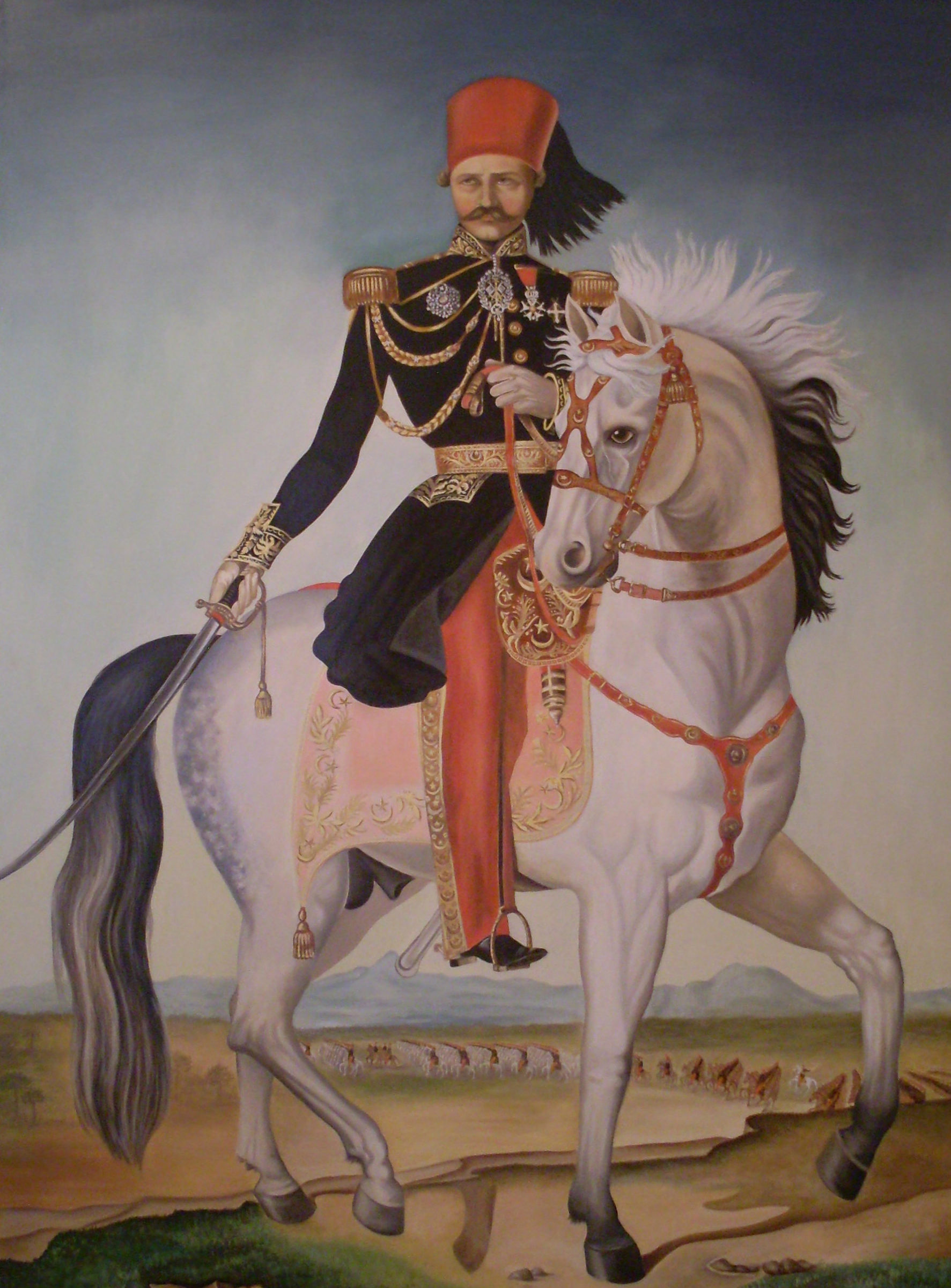
- Portrait of Brigadier General Khair al-Din on horseback

Prime Minister of Tunisia
- In office 22 October 1873 – 21 July 1877
- Monarch: Muhammad III
- Preceded by: Mustapha Khaznadar
- Succeeded by: Mohamed Khaznadar

Grand Vizier of the Ottoman Empire
- In office 4 December 1878 – 29 July 1879
- Monarch: Abdülhamid II
- Preceded by: Mehmed Esad Saffet Pasha
- Succeeded by: Ahmed Arifi Pasha

Speaker of Supreme Council of Tunisia
- In office 1861–1862
- Monarch: Muhammad III
- Preceded by: Office created
- Succeeded by: Mustapha Saheb Ettabaa

Minister of the Navy of Tunisia
- In office 1857–1862
- Monarchs: Muhammad II; Muhammad III
- Preceded by: Mahmoud Khodja
- Succeeded by: Ismaïl Kahia

Personal details
- Born: c. 1820 Abazinia, Circassia
- Died: 30 January 1890 Istanbul, Ottoman Empire
- Resting place: Jellaz Cemetery, Tunis
- Spouse(s): Janina Hanım (m. 1862; death 1870) Two wife (m. 1871; div. 1873) Kamer Hanım (m. 1873)
- Children: Mohamed Salih Pasha

Khayreddin Pasha (Ottoman Turkish: خیرالدین پاشا; (Note: Tunisian Arabic: خير الدين باشا التونسي, romanized: Khayr ad-Dīn Pāshā t-Tūnisiyy; Ottoman Turkish: تونسلى خيرالدين پاشا; Turkish: Tunuslu Hayreddin Paşa) c. 1820 – 30 January 1890) was a Tunisian-Ottoman statesman and reformer, who was born to an Abkhazian family. First serving as Prime Minister of the Beylik of Tunis, he later achieved the high post of Grand Vizier of the Ottoman Empire, serving from 4 December 1878 until 29 July 1879.

He was a political reformer during a period of growing European ascendancy. According to Dr. Abdul Azim Islahi, he was a pragmatic activist who reacted against poverty, and looked to European models for suggestions. He applied the Islamic concept of maslahah (or public interest), to economic issues. He emphasized the central role of justice and security in economic development. He was a major advocate of Tanzimat (or modernization) for Tunisia's political and economic systems.

== Youth in Abkhazia & Turkey ==
Of Abkhaz origin, Hayreddin was born in Abkhazia into "a family of warrior notables". His father Hasan Leffch, a local Abkhaz chieftain, died fighting against a Russian attack on the city of Sukhum. Thereafter as a young orphan Hayreddin was sold into slavery via the Black Sea slave trade, then still a familiar event for Circassian youth. At Istanbul, however, he was eventually traded into a prestigious household, that of the notable Tahsin Bey, a Cypriot Ottoman who was the naqib al-ashraf (head of the Prophet's descendants) and qadi al-'askar (chief judge of the army) of Anatolia, and a poet.

Tahsin Bey moved the boy to his country palace at Kanlıca near the Bosporus, where he became the childhood companion of the Bey's son for a span of years. Khayr al-Din received a "first-rate education" which included the Islamic curriculum, also the Turkish language, and perhaps French; yet he was not raised as a mamluk. Following "the son's tragic premature death" his father Tahsin Bey sold Khayr al-Din in Istanbul to an envoy of Ahmed Bey of Tunis. This new uprooting would obviously provoke emotional turmoil in Khayr al-Din, then about 17 years old. Soon he was on board a ship bound for Africa.

== In Tunisia under Ahmed Bey ==
Circa 1840 Hayreddin became situated at the Bardo Palace, in the court of Ahmed Bey (r. 1837–1855), as a mamluk bi-l-saraya (inner palace retainer). He resumed his high-level studies, mainly at the Bardo Military Academy (al-maktab al-Harbi) a nearby institution newly established by the bey. A key part of his education now was learning to converse in Arabic, also acquaintance with French. At the Husaynid court his abilities were soon recognized, and he was favored with the attention and trust of Ahmad Bey. He rose quickly in the elite cavalry, the nucleus of the bey's new army. Moreover, during the 1840s and 1850s he was sent by the Bey on several key diplomatic missions, e.g., to the Ottoman Porte at Istanbul, which was then pursuing its Tanzimat reforms, and to European capitals, including Paris. His political career thus began auspiciously under this famously modernizing ruler.

In 1846 he accompanied the bey, as part of small staff which included the influential advisor Bin Diyaf, during a two-month state visit to France, after which he was made brigadier general. This trip was of special cultural and political significance in that the orthodox bey traveled for an extended stay to a non-Islamic country in order to acquire familiarity with its modern methods of operation and governance. The trip "expanded the cultural space deemed acceptable for Muslim rulers." The French took care to show France to advantage; the small Tunisian party was well received by top government officials and leading private citizens. "Having traveled beyond the land of Islam, Ahmad Bey was blessed upon his return to Tunis by the grand mufti."

In 1853 Hayreddin was elevated to the highest military grade, commander of the cavalry; he also then became an aide-de-camp of the bey. Yet shortly thereafter he was sent to Paris to arrange a loan for the bey's regime, but where instead he spend four years attempting to reclaim large sums embezzled by the notable Mahmud bin 'Ayyad, former head of the newly created national bank of Tunis, who with foresight had already secured French citizenship. During his years occupied with negotiations in Paris, Hayreddin also managed to browse libraries and bookshops, to improve his French, asking many questions, and to study European society, industry, and finance.

Because of the dire financial situation caused in part by the embezzlement of bin 'Ayyad, the bey's loan did not appear prudent to Hayreddin, according to Prof. Abun-Nasr. Nonetheless, the bey had stifled most political opposition to his financial schemes by long cultivation of the urban ulama and the rural tribal leaders. Due to Hayreddin's passive resistance, however, the loan was still being negotiated when Ahmed Bey died in 1855.

== As Minister of the Navy ==
Upon his return to Tunisia from Paris, Khayr al-Din was appointed Minister of the Navy in 1857. He held responsibility for the expanding ports, Tunis and Goulette, as well as distant Sfax. This involved construction to improve harbor facilities in order to handle the increased commercial shipping, as Mediterranean trade grew markedly. Apparently the number of ships in the Tunisian navy had greatly declined in the face of vessels of modern European design.

Immigration into Tunisia began to surge, leading to difficulties with traditional documentation. Hayreddin proposed the issuance of passports. Here also the Ottoman capitulatory agreements, which gave extraterritorial legal rights to Europeans resident or transient in Tunis, complicated the situation. Contraband was another issue.

Public health became a concern of major importance with quarantine procedures imposed regarding a plague of cholera. The Minister of the Navy oversaw at Goulette the operation of an arsenal, a prison, and a hospital. During this period in his life, as he would be completing his fortieth year, Hayreddin began to consider Tunisia as his adopted country.

== Personal and family life ==
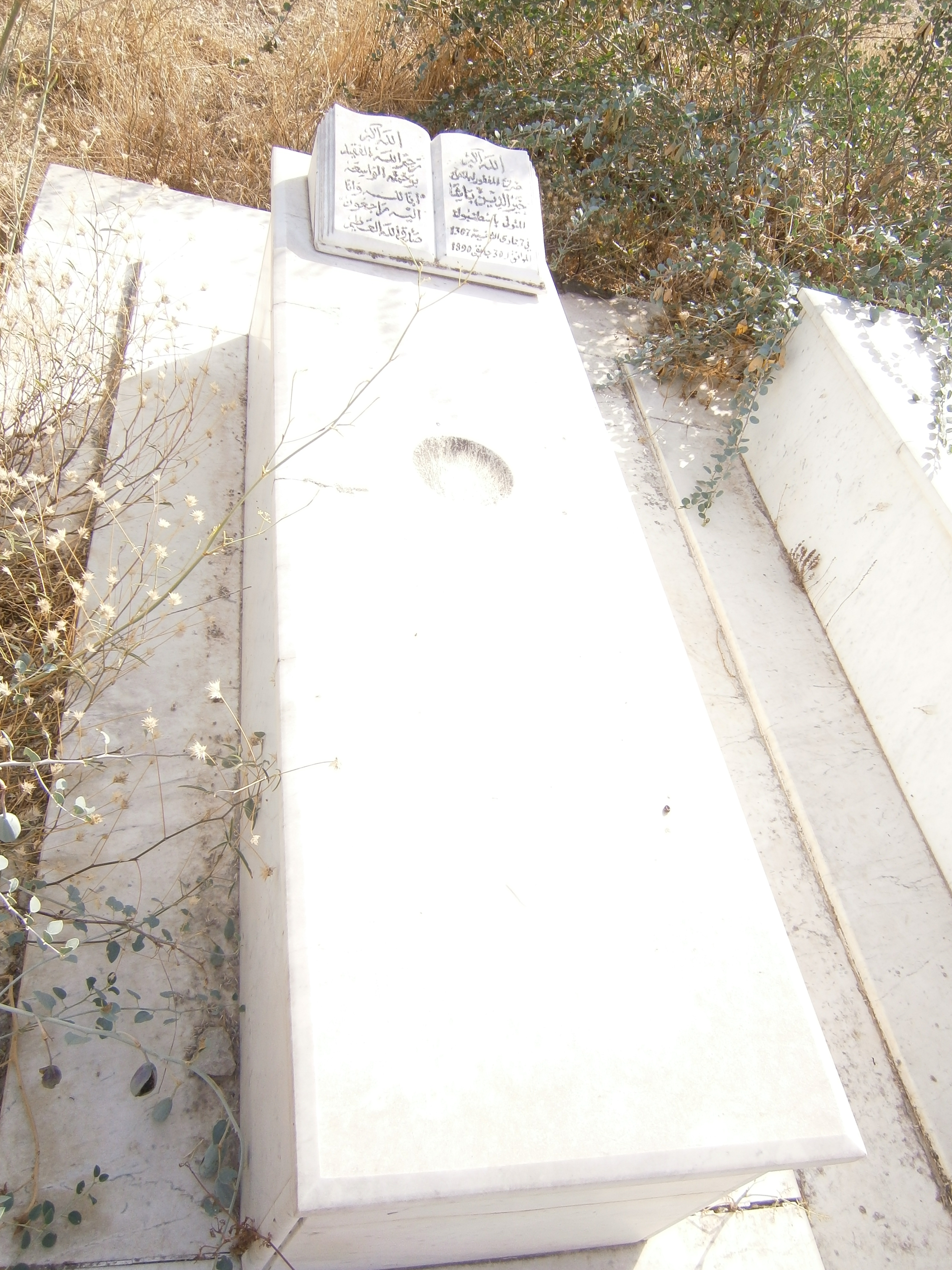
Tomb of Hayreddin Pasha in Tunisia

At about the age of forty, circa 1862, Hayreddin married his first wife, Jeneina, who was the niece of the Bey (that is, the daughter of the Bey's sister, a Husaynid princess). The wedding was announced officially and celebrated with "great pomp". The father of Janina was the insider politician Mustapha Khaznadar, originally from Greece, who served for many years as Grand Vizier. They had three children. Yet Janina and the son died in 1870; the two surviving daughters grew to adulthood and later married well. A year after Janina's death Hayreddin married two Turkish sisters who both gave birth to sons in 1872. Nonetheless, Hayreddin repudiated both in order to marry Kmar (or Qamar, Ar: "Moon"). They had two sons and a daughter. Kmar later moved with her husband to Istanbul and survived him by several years. "It seems probable that Khayr al-Din married the two sisters for the sole purpose of producing male progeny but wed Kmar, his fourth wife, out of love. In any case, his last marriage was monogamous."

After his first wife's death, unmediated discord soon erupted between the son-in-law and the father-in-law. Mustafa Khaznadar, although the Grand Vizier and servant of the Bey, could be an avaricious dealer in extortion, and good at it as well, becoming quite wealthy; while Hayreddin was known to be a committed opponent of tyranny and corruption.

In 1853 Hayreddin had a palace constructed in the suburb of La Manuba, east of Tunis. Here he initially lived with his first wife Janina. This seaside villa lies between the port of La Goulette and Carthage; near where now stands a modern rail station called "Khéreddine" (named after either Barbarossa or al-Tunisi). He apparently also had a "grand residence" in the madina of Tunis, in the quarter Place du Tribunal, and a third elsewhere.

A contemporary European diplomat who "worked with him closely and on friendly terms" describes Hayreddin during the years when he served as the bey's chief minister:

"He was a stout, burly man, with a somewhat heavy countenance, which was occasionally lighted up with a very intelligent... expression... . His manners were considered haughty and overbearing, and... he soon added to the unpopularity to which his foreign extraction and mode of introduction into high office would under any circumstances have exposed him. ... It was difficult to tell his age as he dyed his hair and beard of a hard and deep black colour... ."

After Hayreddin lost his government position at Tunis in 1877, the Ottoman sultan eventually offered him a government position in Istanbul. He then sought to sell his rather large holdings in real estate ("three palaces in Tunis and its suburbs, olive groves, and a vast estate called Enfida consisting of 100,000 hectares"). Fearful of a politically motivated seizure by his enemies who now ran the Tunis government, he sold his Enfida property to the Société Marseillaise in July, 1880. Yet an adjacent parcel was quickly purchased by a seemingly undisclosed agent, who then claimed pre-emptive rights to purchase the Enfida land, denying it to the French company who had already paid for it. The bey's regime evidently supported the pre-emption claim; the conflict became known as the "Enfida affair". Ironically, this mischief spurred the French invasion of April, 1881.

In 1878, while serving in the Ottoman Empire, he was given by the sultan a mansion in Istanbul. Hayreddin died in 1890, surrounded by his family in their konuk [villa] located in Kuruçeşme near the Bosporus. His fourth Son Major-General Damat Mehmed Salih Pasha (c. 1876 – killed at Istanbul, 24 June 1913) by his wife, Kamar Hanım, married at the Dolmabahçe Palace, Istanbul, 29 July 1907 with Șehzade Ahmed Kemaleddin's only daughter Münire Sultan (Dolmabahçe Palace, Istanbul, 13 November 1880 – Nice, France, 7 October 1939, and buried there), and got Sultanzade Ahmed Kemaledin Keredin (18 June 1909 – 1987), married and left Issue.

== Constitution and Grand Council ==
The reformist constitution promulgated in 1861 established new institutions of government, in particular an advisory and legislative body called the Majlis al-Akbar or Grand Council. The first to serve as its president was Hayreddin, appointed by the bey. Yet strong opposition and factional intrigues of the existing leadership, largely directed by the long-time Grand Vizier, Mustapha Khaznadar, quickly developed which made the situation unworkable for a reformist agenda to prevail. Mustapha was also the father of Janina and the new father-in-law of Hayreddin. Instead of accommodating the powers-that-be, however, Hayreddin left office voluntarily in 1862.

== His book: The Surest Path ==
During his voluntary exile to Europe, he acquired French. There he observed first hand the style and manner of politics of the innovating West. His 1867 book Aqwam al-Masālik fī Ma'rifat Aḥwāl al-Mamālik [The Surest Path to Knowledge regarding the Condition of Countries] makes a comparison between European and Muslim states. In it he proposed strategies for governance and compared European political systems. Also he articulated a path to follow in order to achieve necessary reforms.

It counsels a moderate course, adopting selective Western programs and techniques while maintaining Tunisian traditions. He appealed directly to Muslim clerics, the ulama, and stressed that the elite ruling class should serve as stewards of the people's welfare.

== International Finance Commission ==
In 1869 he became the first chairman of the International Finance Commission in Tunisia, created to manage government revenue and expenditures.

== His reforming Vizierate in Tunis ==
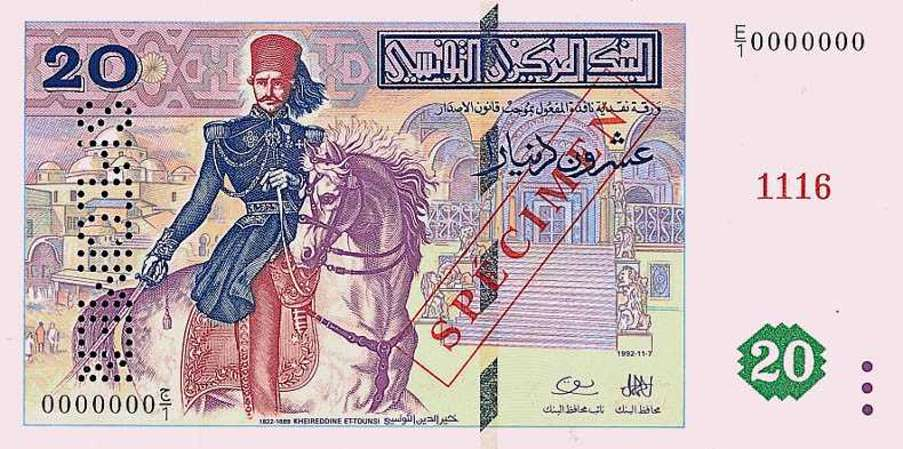
Kheireddine Ettounsi on Tunisian 20 dinar note (1992).

Later Hayreddin led the Tunisian government as its chief minister (1873–1877). His last years were spent in Ottoman service, where he was briefly the sultan's grand vizier (1878–1879).

While prime minister under Sadok Bey, Hayreddin establish the Habus Council in 1874 to improve the utility of the extensive lands given to religious trusts. Legal changes were made to existing qanun law so that it might better encourage trade and commerce; the result was later called "le code Khaïreddine" which affected contracts and obligations. Administrative reforms of government institutions were made at Justice and Finance. In foreign affairs, he fostered closer ties with the Ottoman Empire, under the mistaken opinion that it would forestall European interference. Hayreddin also advanced the modernized curriculum at the Ez-Zitouna University. Later he worked to establish Collège Sadiki, a lycee devoted to teaching modern subjects to the next generation of Tunisia's leaders.

A recent evaluation of Hayreddin's Vizierate, in light of the progress in Tunisia during the more than a century since, makes several observations. The first regards his coordination with the Tunisian ulama in order to make the government reforms; the second his familiarity with European political institutions:

"Reform in politics necessitates renewal in religious matters, including rational interpretation of the divine scripture and cognizance by the learned scholars of Islam of worldly matters and events in order for them to be able to render contextual understanding of the sacred texts. Khayr al-Din makes this bold move in the pursuit of reform that emulates Europe. The subsequent synergy between luminaries within, on the one hand, the state machinery and, on the other, the Zaytuna mosque university drew a reformist itinerary that still indelibly inspires the engineering of renewal agendas in modern day Tunisia."

"The second idiosyncrasy is the attempt to harmonize the mundane and the sacred, the 'Eastern' religious knowledge with 'Western' political genius. The political thought of the Beylic of Tunisia's Grand Vizier, Khayr al-Din al Tunsi, is paradigmatic of this harmonization.

== As Grand Vizier in Istanbul ==
In 1878 Hayreddin was invited by the Ottoman sultan to relocate to Istanbul for government service. He worked initially on the Financial Reform Commission during 1878, being charged with modernization of the empire's tax and budgetary process. Obtaining the sultan's confidence, he soon was appointed Grand Vizier of the Ottoman Empire for a short period, from 4 December 1878 to 29 July 1879. Quickly he became resented as an outsider by the imperial political class.

"Heyreddin Pasha of Tunisia" was a "maladroit speaker of the [Turkish] language" who "made it to the position of grand vizier in 1878. Even though he had a fair command of written Arabic and French, his underlings could not resist making fun of his Ottoman Turkish."

To advance his reform policies, Hayreddin enlisted foreign support to triangulate his political position and gain some independence of action. Nonetheless he could accomplish little; furthermore, this strategy led to his alienation of the sultan and his rather rapid dismissal. In 1882 he refused the offer of a second term as Grand Vizier.

== Memoir and latter writings ==
From Hayreddin's letters "it seems that in 1878 he would have preferred to return home to Tunis." The French invasion of 1881 and their subsequent protectorate in Tunisia ended such hopes. At the spacious mansion in Istanbul given to him by the sultan, Hayreddin remained in retirement during his last decade, but his rheumatoid arthritis made life difficult and his exile brought him some bitterness. Nonetheless, here he composed various written works.

In French he dictated his memoirs to several different secretaries skilled in the language, indicating that the Francophone world was an important target audience, whether in Africa, in Europe, or in the Middle East. He titled his memoirs A mes enfants: ma vie privee et politique [To My Children: My private and political life]. In these memoir and in several other writings, he pointedly defended his reforms while Grand Vizier of Beylical Tunisia.

A close reading of Khayr al-Din, especially his memoirs and later writings (perhaps written frankly, without ulterior intent), shows him to favor traditional government like the Ottomans, opines Prof. Brown:

Khair al-Din "was always well within the mainstream of medieval Islamic political thought, with its emphasis on stewardship, i.e., a rigid separation between the rulers and the ruled, whose mutual relations were guided by the parallel of the shepherd and his flock... . It was stewardship—a sense of noblesse oblige--rather than a passion for representative democracy which guided Khayr al-Din. [W]here he had a free hand, Khayr al-Din had chosen almost all his own ministers from the mamluk class."

Prof. Brown then quotes at some length, from Khayr al-Din's memoirs, a passage which describes the pre-existing corruption of the Beyical government as the source of the problem during his years as Grand Vizier. As the reformist solution, Khayr al-Din sought to "create a new administrative system, based on justice and equity, to destroy abuses and arbitrary actions" and restore "the government in its sacred role of protector of the people" and so "conduct the country on the road to prosperity.",

A more forward-looking portrait of Hayreddin is rendered by Prof. Clancy-Smith, although her contrary portrait does not appear to contradict Prof. Brown's conclusions wholesale. Here, she celebrates the "cosmopolitanism of Tunis, which was not an identity so much as a manner of social existence."

"In the mamluk tradition at its best, Khayr al-Din gave unwavering loyalty to the Husaynids [the Beys of Tunis] and sultans [of the Ottoman Empire]--until their policies violated his notion of just government informed by his own lived experience, Islamic moral precepts, and chosen European political principles. ... As prime minister, however, he further dismantled the mamluk system... . ... As a borderland intellectual, he operated at multiple points of intersection: between the Maghrib and the Ottoman Empire; Europe and North Africa; the central Mediterranean corridor and the sea writ large; the universe of the philosopher-educator and the statesman. ... [His book] could be recast as a modern expression of the rihla [journey or pilgrimage] through which Khayr al-Din attempted to legitimate distant or foreign knowledge."

During his last years, Hayreddin also turned to writing memoranda on the reformation of the Ottoman regime addressed to the unreceptive Sultan Abdul Hamid II. In these Hayreddin addressed many subjects, e.g., the civil service (education and remuneration), the legislature (method of election and limitations on its scope of action), and how to hold high officials accountable for their actions. Several of his proposals were taken up later by others pursuing reform.

== Family and issue ==
He married four times:

- In 1862, he married Janina Hanım, daughter of the sister of the Bey and Mustafa Khaznadar Pasha. They had two sons and a daughter. Janina and one of their son died in 1870.
- In 1871, he married two sisters, and both give him a son in 1872. He divorced by them in 1873.
- In 1873 he married Kamer Hanım. They had two sons, amongs them Mehmed Salih, who married Münire Sultan (granddaughter of Sultan Abdulmejid I); and a daughter.

== Tributes ==
His character appears in Sami Fehri's television series, Tej El Hadhra, portrayed by actor Yassine Ben Gamra.

== Honours ==
- Grand Cordon of the Order of Glory (Tunisia)
- Grand Cordon of the Order of Nichân ed-Dam (Tunisia)
- Grand Cordon of the Order of Nichân Ahd El-Amân (Tunisia)
- Grand Cordon of the Order of Nichân El-Ahd El-Mourassaâ (Tunisia)
- Grand Cordon of the Order of Osmanieh (Ottoman Empire)
- Grand Cordon of the Order of the Medjidie (Ottoman Empire)
- Grand Cordon of the Order of Glory (Ottoman Empire)
- Grand Cordon of the Order of Distinction (Ottoman Empire)
- Grand-croix of the National Order of the Legion of Honour (France)
- Grand-croix of the Order of Leopold (Austria)

== See also ==
- History of Ottoman era Tunisia (1574–1705)
- Ahmad I ibn Mustafa (Bey, 1837–1855)
- Muhammad II ibn al-Husayn (Bey, 1855–1859)
- Muhammad III as-Sadiq (Bey, 1859–1882)
- History of French era Tunisia (1881–1956)

== Bibliography ==
- Khayr al-Dīn Pāshā al-Tūnisiyy:
  - Islahi, Abdul Azim. "Economic ideas of a nineteenth century Tunisian statesman: Khayr al-Din al-Tunisi." Hamdard Islamicus (2012): 61-80 online.
  - Leon Carl Brown, editor, The Surest Path. The political treatise of a nineteenth-century Muslim statesman. A translation of the Introduction to The Surest Path to knowledge concerning the condition of countries by Khayr al-Din al-Tunisi (Harvard University: Center for Middle Eastern Studies 1967). Khair al-Din's The Surest Path (written in Arabic) was first published 1867–1868 at Tunis. Included in the above 1967 edition is Brown's "An Appreciation of The Surest Path", at 1–64, followed by the translation at 65–178.
  - M. S. Mzali and J. Pignon, editors, Khérédine: Homme d'etat (Tunis: Maison Tunisienne de l'Edition 1971), and also their earlier, edited: "Documents sur Khéréddine" in Revue Tunisienne:
    - "A mes enfants" at 23: 177–225, 347–369 (1934), i.e., his memoirs, "A mes infants: Ma vie privée et politique";
    - "Mon programme" at 24: 51–80 (1935);
    - "Le problème tunisienne vu à travers la question d'Orient" at 24: 209–233 (1935); 25: 223–254 (1936);
    - "Réponse à la calomnie" at 26: 209–252, 409–432 (1937); 27: 79–91 (1938);
    - "Corespondance" at 27: 92–153 (1938); 29: 71–107, 251–302 (1940).
- Other literature:
  - Jamil M. Abun-Nasr, A History of the Maghrib (Cambridge University 1971).
  - Lisa Anderson, The State and Social Transformation in Tunisia and Libya, 1830–1980 (Princeton University 1986).
  - L. Carl Brown, The Tunisia of Ahmad Bey 1837–1855 (Princeton University 1974).
  - Julia A. Clancy-Smith, Mediterraneans. North Africa and Europe in an Age of Migration, c.1800–1900 (University of California 2011).
  - Arnold H. Green, The Tunisian Ulama 1873–1915. Social structure and response to ideological currents (Leiden: E. J. Brill 1978).
  - Azzedine Guellouz, Abdelkader Masmoudi, Mongi Smida, Ahmed Saadaoui, Les Temps Modernes. 941–1247 A.H./1534-1881 (Tunis: Sud Editions 2004). [Histoire Générale de Tunisie, Tome III].
  - Albert Hourani, Arabic Thought in the Liberal Age, 1798–1939 (Oxford University 1962, 1967).
  - Ahmad ibn Abi Diyaf, Consult Them in the Matter. A nineteenth-century Islamic argument for constitutional government. The Muqaddima (Introduction) to Ithaf Ahl al-Zaman bi Akhbar Muluk Tunis wa 'Ahd al-Aman (Presenting Contemporaries the History of the Rulers of Tunis and the Fundamental Pact) by Ahmad ibn Abi Diyaf (University of Arkansas 2005), translated with introduction and notes by L. Carl Brown.
  - Abdallah Laroui, L'Histoire du Maghreb. Un essai de synthèse (Paris: Librairie François Maspero 1970), translated by Ralph Manheim as The History of the Maghrib. An interpretive essay (Princeton University 1977).
  - Brieg Powel and Larbi Sadiki, Europe and Tunisia. Democritization via association (New York: Routledge 2010).
  - Kenneth J. Perkins, A History of Modern Tunisia (Cambridge University 2004).
  - Kenneth J. Perkins, Historical Dictionary of Tunisia (Metuchen, NJ: Scarecrow 1989).
  - Stanford J. Shaw and Ezel Kural Shaw, History of the Ottoman Empire and Turkey, volume II: Reform, Revolution, and Republic: The rise of modern Turkey, 1808–1975 (Cambridge University 1977).
  - G. S. Van Krieken, Khayr al-Din et la Tunisie (1850–1881) (Leiden: E. J. Brill 1976).
  - Nicola A. Ziadeh, Origins of Nationalism in Tunisia (American University of Beirut 1962).
