= L. Carl Brown =

American academic (1928–2020)

Leon Carl Brown (April 22, 1928 – April 8, 2020) was a professor of history at Princeton University.

== Biography ==
Brown was the Garrett Professor in Foreign Affairs, Emeritus, and professor of Near Eastern studies, emeritus, at Princeton University. He was a member of the Princeton faculty from 1966 to 1993 and served for many years as chair of the Department of Near Eastern Studies and director of the interdisciplinary Program in Near Eastern Studies. Brown trained many leading scholars in Middle East studies.

L. Carl Brown was born in Mayfield, Kentucky, on April 22, 1928. He received a bachelor’s degree from Vanderbilt University in 1950 and a master’s degree from the University of Virginia. In the 1950s, Brown spent six years with the U.S. Foreign Service in Lebanon and Sudan. In 1962, he completed his Ph.D. in history and Middle Eastern studies at Harvard University and taught there before joining Princeton’s faculty in 1966.

Brown was the author of numerous books and articles, among them, “The Surest Path: The Political Treatise of a 19th-Century Muslim Statesman” (1967), “The Tunisia of Ahmad Bey” (1975), “International Politics in the Middle East: Old Rules, Dangerous Game” (1984) and “Religion and State: The Muslim Approach to Politics” (2000). In 2005, Brown received the Arkansas Arabic Translation Award by the University of Arkansas Press and the university’s King Fahd Center of Middle East and Islamic Studies for his translation of “Consult Them in the Matter: A 19th-Century Islamic Argument for Constitutional Government,” a treatise by Ahmad ibn Abi Diyaf, the 19th-century Tunisian bureaucrat and reformer about Ibn Khaldun's muqaddima. The work is considered a pioneering text in modern Arab and Islamic political philosophy.

Brown served as president of the Middle East Studies Association and on the boards of governors of the Institute of Current World Affairs and the Middle East Institute. He received a Guggenheim Fellowship in 1973. In 1985, he worked with the New Jersey Network to produce a documentary television series titled “World & Time,” comprising five half-hour telecasts aired in June on N.J. public broadcast stations. The first program in the series, “Islam and Politics,” examined the roots of radicalism among Muslim fundamentalists within the context of 200 years of Western political influence.

Brown died on April 8, 2020. He was 91 years old.

== Selected works ==
- Tunisia: The Politics of Modernization (co-author; 1964)
- State and Society in Independent North Africa (editor; 1966)
- The Surest Path — The Political Treatise of a Nineteenth-Century Muslim Statesman (translator, with commentary; 1967)
- From Madina to Metropolis: Heritage and Change in the Near Eastern City (editor; 1973)
- The Tunisia of Ahmad Bey (author; 1975)
- Psychological Dimensions of Near Eastern Studies (co-editor; 1977)
- International Politics in the Middle East: Old Rules, Dangerous Game (author; 1984)
- Centerstage: American Diplomacy Since World War II (editor; 1990)
- The Modernization of the Ottoman Empire and Its Afro-Asian Successors (co-editor; 1992)
- Imperial Legacy: The Ottoman Imprint on the Balkans and the Middle East (editor; 1996)
- Franco-Arab Encounters (co-editor; 1996)
- Religion and State: The Muslim Approach to Politics (author; 2000)
- Diplomacy in the Middle East: The International Relations of Regional and Outside Powers (editor; 2001, revised edition 2004)
- Consult Them in the Matter: A Nineteenth-Century Islamic Argument for Constitutional Government (translator, with commentary; 2005)
