= Bardo Military Academy =

Military school in Tunisia

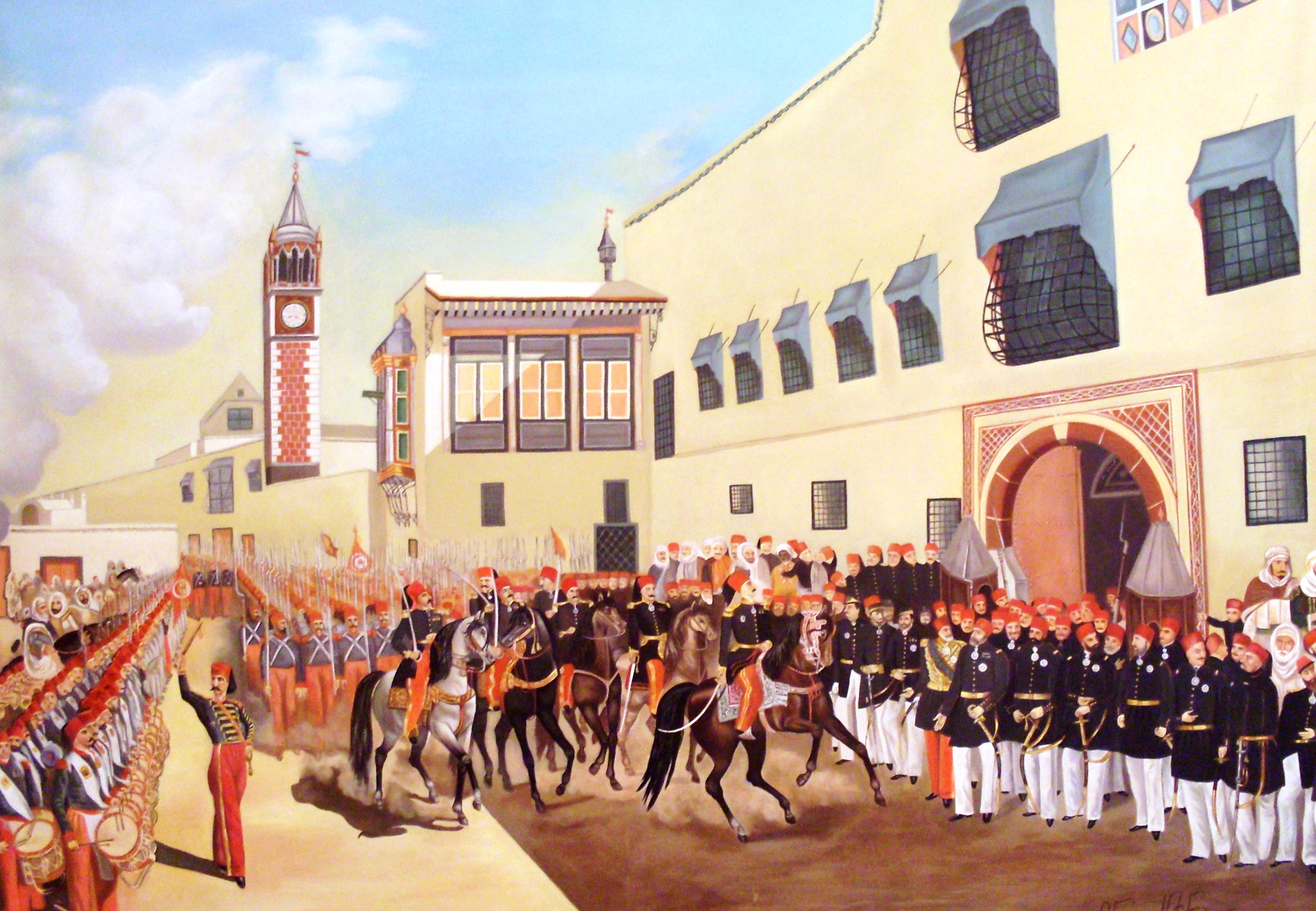
- Type: Military university
- Established: March 5, 1837; 188 years ago
- Location: Tunis, Tunisia

The Bardo Military Academy was established in 1840 in Tunisia by the government of Ahmad Bey. Its goal was to modernize the military in line with changing international standards and practices. Subjects taught included "military art and history, artillery, topography, French and Italian languages, and Arabic language and literature."

As author Safwan M. Masri has noted, "Bardo was the first school in Tunisia not to be run by religious authorities," "marking a new era of secular education."

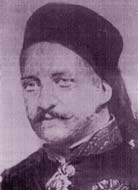

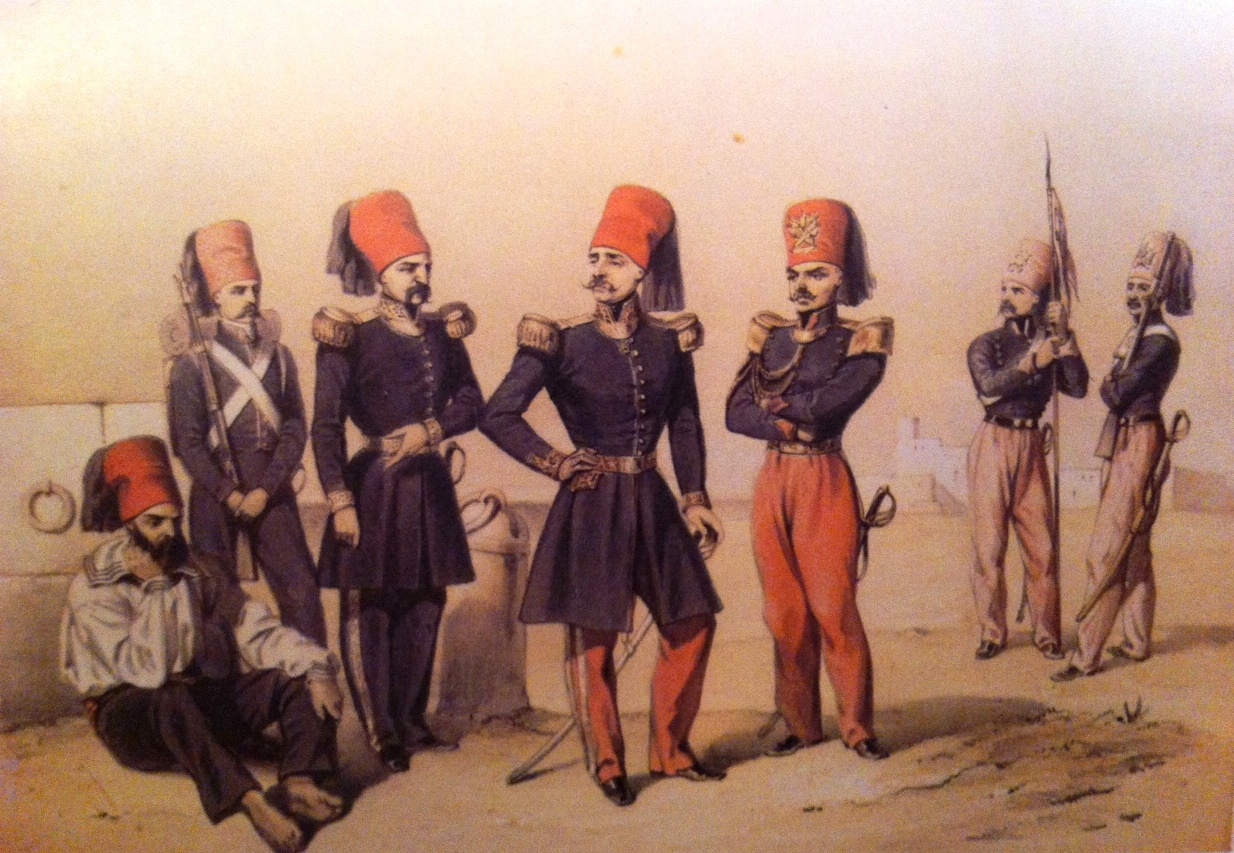

== See also ==
- Beylical Tunisia
