= Ahmad ibn Abi Diyaf =

- أحمد بن أبي الضياف
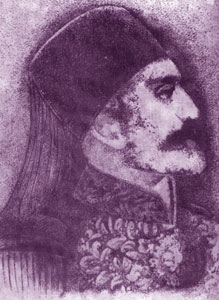
- Born: 1804; Tunisia
- Died: 1874 (aged 69–70); Tunis, Tunisia
- Occupations: author, historian

Ahmad ibn Abi Diyaf (Arabic: أحمد بن أبي الضياف) (1804, Tunis – 1874), known colloquially as Bin Diyaf, was the author of a chronicle of Tunisian history. He was also a long-time and trusted official in the Beylical government of Tunisia. His multi-volume history, while it begins with the 7th-century arrival of the Arabs, devotes the most attention to details of the Husainid dynasty (1705–1957), during the 18th and 19th centuries. His writing is informed by his experience as chancellery secretary during the reigns of five Beys in succession. Bin Diyaf himself eventually favored the reform view, which was current then in Tunisian politics. His letter in reply to questions about Tunisian women has also attracted the interest of scholars of history.

== Life and career ==
Bin Diyaf was born into a prominent family from the Awlad ʿUn tribe from the Siliana region, and his father being an important scribe for the ruling regime. Trained thoroughly in the traditional religious curriculum, Bin Diyaf entered government service in 1827. "He was soon promoted to the post of private (or secret) secretary, a position he held under successive beys until his retirement only a short time before his death."

Other tasks were also assigned to him. In 1831 he was sent to the Ottoman Porte in Istanbul regarding fall-out from the 1830 French occupation of Algiers. In 1834 the Bey appointed Bin Diyaf as liaison between the quasi-independent al-Majlis al-Shar'i (supreme religious council) and the Bey's own vizier, regarding a civil war in neighboring Tarabulus and the designs of the Ottoman Empire there. He returned on business to Istanbul in 1842 and accompanied Ahmed Bey to Paris in 1846. His famous letter on the status of women was written in 1856. As part of his duties, Bin Diyaf also served as a mediator, e.g., to assist in resolving a dispute between two imams at the Zitouna Mosque. Bin Diyaf composed the Arabic version of the ^Ahd al-Aman ("Security Covenant," or "Fundamental Pact") (prepared originally in French), a version of this transformational reformist law which proved acceptable to the Muslim community, and which Muhammad Bey officially issued in 1857.

Bin Diyaf favored moderate reforms of the state. From his insider perspective, he came to understand that the Beys, in common with other Maghriban rulers, governed as functional autocrats. "Even though the personal exercise of power was tempered and circumscribed by religious and traditional restraints, it continued to be arbitrary and total." Bin Diyaf eventually became a "partisan" of the reforms being advanced off and on in Tunisia in the mid-nineteenth century. From 1857 to 1861 and from 1869 to 1877 Khayr al-Din, the high government official, was strongly advocating reform policies in political circles. Bin Diyaf took part in crafting the 1857 Fundamental pact (or Pledge of Security) guaranteeing the rights of non-Muslim Tunisians and non Tunisians. He collaborated with Khayr al-Din to establish the famous, though short-lived, Constitution of 1861, which was opposed by the conservative ulama.; Bin Diyaf was the one who officially read the new constitution to the national assembly. Bin Diyaf also crafted the new list of lectures at the University of the Zeytuna Mosque, pivoting towards a more modern curriculu. He was named president of the commission judging matters between Tunisians and foreigners. However, after the 1864 revolt, Bin Diyaf tended to become gradually pushed aside from decision-making circles. Khayr al-Din managed to initiate institutional changes only for a while during his premiership (1873–1877).

Despite his involvement in modernizing reforms, Bin Diyaf was personally familiar with, and adept at, the philosophy and practice of long-standing social and state traditions. He knew the customary etiquette expected of him in a given political situation. In his official position, he performed his duties in close proximity with the Bey and the conservative elite, with old distinguished families and with the Muslim ulama who followed "an elaborate code of politesse."

Bin Dayaf rendered his official services under Husain Bey (1824–1835), Mustafa Bey (1835–1837), Ahmed Bey (1837–1855), Muhammad Bey (1855–1859), and Sadok Bey (1859–1882). His death in 1874 occurred while Khayr al-Din was serving as the premier. The reigning monarch and head of state, under whom Bin Dayaf had labored, attended his funeral ceremony.

== Multi-volume chronicle ==
His major work was in Arabic, Ithaf Ahl al-zaman bi Akhbar muluk Tunis wa 'Ahd el-Aman, translated as: Presenting Contemporaries the History of Rulers of Tunis and the Fundamental Pact. A complete version, newly edited, of the Arabic text was published in eight volumes by the Tunisian government during 1963–1966. Recently, this work's relatively short "Introduction" ("Muqaddima") has been translated into English by Princeton professor Leon Carl Brown.

Of eight volumes, the first six address Tunisian history from the arrival of the Muslim Arabs forward. The account is summary until 1705, when the Husainid dynasty commences. Bin Diyaf draws on his study of the archives and background of the Beys from the 18th century, and on his own experiences as a beylical official during the 19th. These 'Husainid' volumes present "an abundance of personal and accurate information". For example, Bin Diyaf sheds light on the circumstances surrounding the notorious trial of Batto Sfez in 1857. The last two volumes contain over 400 biographies of "leading statesmen and religious figures who died between the years 1783 and 1872." Included are the careers of many ulama and others, holding such offices as: shadhid (witness), katib (clerk), qaid (judge), mufti (jurisconsult), and imam (prayer leader). He labored over the details of this chronicle more than ten years.

Evident in the pages are his "mastery of the customary notions of bureaucratic practice in combination with his access to the inside story... and his undeniable perceptiveness and intelligence".

"Bin Diyaf not only reconstructs the story as seen from within. He reveals himself and, through him, the agonies and hopes of his generation and class. A heightened appreciation of the ideological confrontation between traditional Islam and the intruding West necessarily results."

Bin Diyaf's description of dynasty politics and of the lives of officials "make the work a major reference source for the period."

== Epistle on Women ==
His Risalah fi al'mar'a [Epistle on Women] was a response to a list of 23 questions posed by Léon Roches, then French Consul General in Tunis. Written longhand in 1856, the thirty-page manuscript addresses the social role of women in Tunisia, their legal rights and duties, regarding family and conjugal relations: marriage, divorce, polygamy, public presence (veiling, seclusion, segregation, repudiation), household tasks and management, and lack of education. It was perhaps the most informative writing from the 19th century "on the everyday life of the Muslim woman and on the Tunisian family structure". Although in politics a contemporary reformer, here Bin Diyaf appears as "highly conservative".

== Bibliography ==
=== Bin Diyaf ===
- Ahmad Ibn Abi Diyaf, Ithaf Ahl al-zaman bi Akhbar muluk Tunis wa 'Ahd el-Aman (Tunis: Secrétariat d'Etat à l'Information et à la Culture 1963–1966, 8 volumes. (Other agencies of the Tunisian government also printed this edition.)
  - Ahmad Ibn Abi Diyaf, Ithaf, first published evidently as: al-Awwal min al'Ikd kitab, Ithaf Ahl az-Zaman bi-Tunes 'akhbar muluk wa 'Ahd al Aman, at Tunis in 1901 (1319 A.H.) by: al-Matba'a Rasmiya al-Aribiya.
  - Ahmad ibn Abi Diyaf, Consult them in the matter: A Nineteenth-Century Islamic Argument for Constitutional Government. The Muqaddima (Introduction) to Ithaf Ahl al-Zaman bi Akhbar Muluk Tunis wa 'Ahd el-Aman (Presenting Contemporaries the History of the Rulers of Tunis and the Fundamental Pact) by Ahmad ibn Abi Diyaf (University Press of Arkansas 2005), translated, introduced, and annotated by Leon Carl Brown. This volume, at 41–136, contains only Bin Diyaf's "Introduction" to his multi-volume Ithaf.
- Ahmad ibn Abi Diyaf, Risalah fi al-mar'a [handwritten manuscript, 30 pages] (Tunis 1856).
  - Ahmad ibn Abi Diyaf, Risalah fi al-mar'a, translated into modern Arabic and analyzed by Munsif al-Shanufi, "Risalat Ahmad Abi al-Diyaf fi al-mar'a" in Hawliyat al-Jamia al-Tunisiya (1968), at 49–109.
  - Ahmad ibn Abi Diyaf, Risalah fi al-mar'a, French translation and analysis by Bechir Tlili, "A l'aube du Mouvement de reformes a Tunis: Un important document de Ahmad Ibn Abi al-Diyaf sur le Féminisme (1856)" in Ethnies (1973), at 167–230.

=== General ===
- Jamil Abun-Nasr, A History of the Maghrib (Cambridge University 1971).
- Leon Carl Brown, "The religious establishment in Husainid Tunisia", at 47–91, in Scholars, Saints, and Sufis. Muslim Religious Institutions since 1500 (University of California 1972, 1978), edited by Nikki R. Keddie.
- Leon Carl Brown, The Tunisia of Ahmad Bey (Princeton University 1974).
- Çiçek Coşkun, Modernization and Women in Tunisia. An analysis through selected films . Master's Thesis (August, 2006), at Middle East Technical University, Ankara, Turkey.
- Azzedine Guellouz, Abdelkader Masmoudi, Mongi Smida, Ahmed Saadaoui, Les Temps Modernes. 941-1247 H./1534-1881 (Tunis: Sud Editions 2010). [Histoire Général de la Tunisie, Tome III].
- Elbaki Hermassi, Leadership and National Development in North Africa. A comparative study (University of California 1972, 1975).
- Kenneth J. Perkins, Historical Dictionary of Tunisia (Metuchen NJ: The Scarecrow Press 1989).
- Kenneth J. Perkins, A History of Modern Tunisia (Cambridge University 2004).

== See also ==
- Ahmed Bey
- Khair al-Din al-Tunsi
- Muhammad Bey
- Sadok Bey
