= Italian Tunisians =

Italian community in Tunisia

Italian Tunisian
Italo-tunisini (Italian)

Total population
- 3,000 (by birth, 2006)

Regions with significant populations
- Tabarka, La Goulette, Tunis Italian Tunisians living in Italy: Sicily, Rome (migrant descendants of those people, from Sicily), Naples (Sicilian Tunisian immigrants)

Languages
- French, Italian, Tunisian Arabic, Sicilian, Neapolitan, other Italian dialects

Religion
- Roman Catholicism

Related ethnic groups
- Italians, Italian Algerians, Italian Angolans, Italian Egyptians, Italian Eritreans, Italian Ethiopians, Italian Libyans, Italian Moroccans, Italian Mozambicans, Italian Somalis, Italian South Africans, Italian Zimbabweans

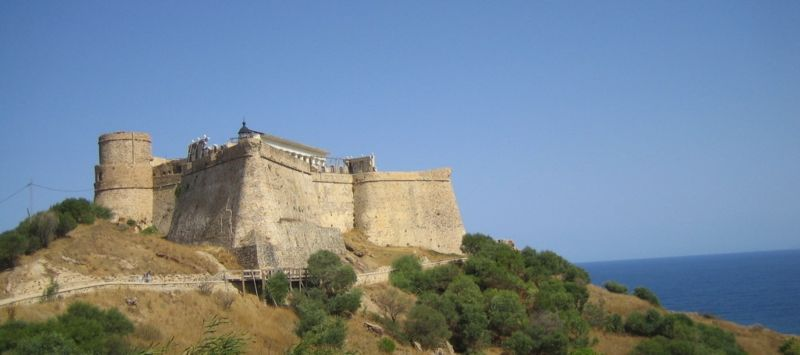
Genoese fort at the island of Tabarka, near Biserta, in the northern coast of Tunisia facing Sardinia.

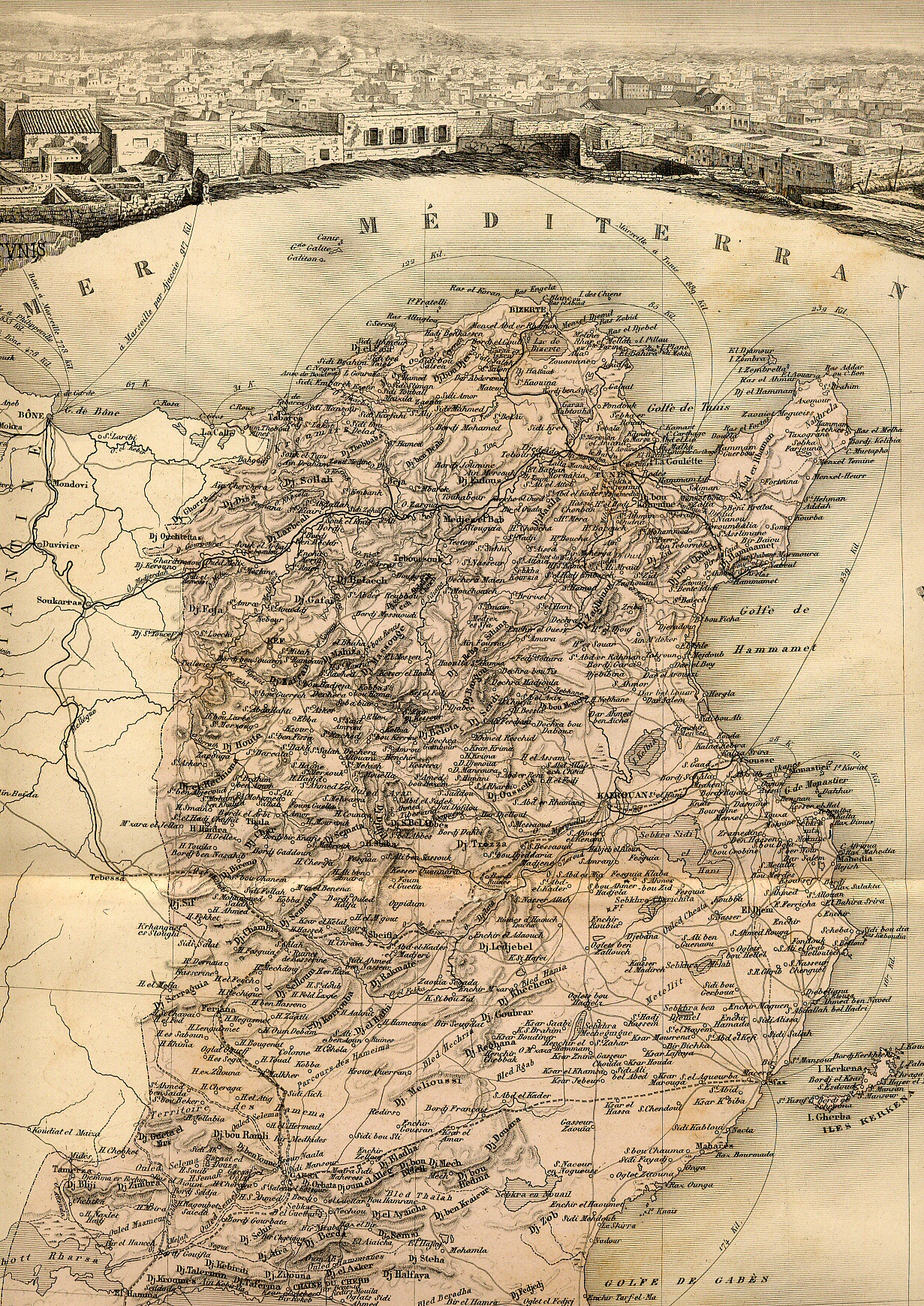
Map of Tunisia in 1902, when the Tunisian Italians were its biggest European community. The island of Tabarka can be seen in full resolution near the Algerian border.

Italian Tunisians (Italian: Italo-tunisini, or Italians of Tunisia) are Tunisian-born citizens who are fully or partially of Italian descent, whose ancestors were Italians who emigrated to Tunisia during the Italian diaspora, or Italian-born people in Tunisia. Migration and colonization, particularly during the 19th century, led to significant numbers of Italians settling in Tunisia.

== Italian presence in Tunisia ==
The presence of Italian peoples in Tunisia began in the first half of the 19th century that its economic and social weight became critical in many fields of the social life of the country.

The Republic of Genoa owned the island of Tabarka near Biserta, where the Genoese family Lomellini, who had purchased the grant of the coral fishing from the Ottoman Turks, maintained a garrison from 1540 to 1742. Here may still be seen the ruins of a stronghold, a church and some Genoese buildings. At Tabarka the ruins consist of a pit once used as a church and some fragments of walls which belonged to Christian buildings.

Italian Jews from Livorno created the first foreign community in Tunisia, after the 16th century. In those centuries, the Italian language became the lingua franca in the field of the commerce in the Maghreb.

After the 1848 revolutions many Italian patriots sought refuge in Tunis; among them were Giuseppe Morpurgo and Pompeo Sulema, from Leghorn (even Garibaldi had called at Tunis in 1834 to advise Bey Hussein on the administration of a modern navy; he came back in 1849 and was hosted at Palazzo Gnecco, Rue de l'Ancienne Douane.) Among the exiled was Gustavo Modena, who earned his living by teaching Italian to the Tunisian gentry 'smerciando participi' (peddling participles, in his own inventive expression.) Sulema opened a regular school that was soon patronized by the Jewish minority, both local and from Leghorn, as it was not a confessional one, while the other Italians preferred to follow the Rotonda and Visconti school. Another Italian school was opened in 1845 by Morpurgo, Luisada and Salone, joined later by Sulema, and was closed in 1863. Trading houses of the regency in this period were mostly Italian (Bensasson, Fiorentino, Gutierrez, Moreno, Peluffo, Sonnino.) On 4 January 1874 the Italian community, headed by the Consul, opened an elementary school that was partly funded by the state: on opening it had 73 pupils, half of them from the Jewish community. The secretary of state of the Bey, today we would say the prime minister of the time, was often an Italian. In 1859 the trade convention between the Bey of Tunis and the consul general of Austria, Giovanni Gasparo Merlato, had been written in Italian; that is no wonder, since in the Austrian Empire as a federal entity, the official language for the Navy and most of the trade was Italian. Around the start of the 20th century there was also an Italian newspaper in Tunis, called L'Unione, which clamored for annexation of the territory; but France was gradually taking hold and, after 1902, foreign lawyers (most of whom were Italian nationals) could not practice unless they had a French degree, and the license from the Italian High School in Tunis was not adequate to gain access to a French university.

The first Italians in Tunisia at the beginning of the 19th century were mainly traders and professionals in search of new opportunities, coming from Liguria and the other regions of northern Italy. In those years even a great number of Italian political exiles (related to Giuseppe Mazzini and the Carbonari organizations) were forced into expatriation in Tunisia, in order to escape the political oppression enacted by the preunitary States of the Italian peninsula. One of them was Giuseppe Garibaldi, in 1834 and 1849.

In a move that foreshadowed the Triple alliance, Italian colonial interests in Tunisia were actually encouraged by the Germans and Austrians in the late 19th century to offset French interests in the region and to retain a perceived balance of power in Europe. The Austrians also had an interest in diverting Italy's attention away from the Trentino.

At the end of the 19th century, Tunisia received the immigration of tens of thousands of Italians, mainly from Sicily and also Sardinia. As a consequence, in the first years of the 20th century there were more than 100,000 Italian residents in Tunisia. They concentrated not only in Tunis, Biserta, La Goulette, and Sfax, but even in small cities like Zaghouan, Bouficha, Kelibia, and Ferryville.

In those years, the Italian community was the main European community in the French Protectorate: Sicilians made up 72.5% of the community's population, while 16.3% were from central Italy (mainly Tuscan Jews), 3.8% were Sardinians and 2.5% from northern Italy (mainly from Veneto and Emilia).

The small city of La Goulette (called La Goletta by the Italian Tunisians) was practically developed by Italian immigrants in the 19th century, who constituted nearly half the population until the 1950s (the international actress Claudia Cardinale was born there in 1938).

Year	Muslim Tunisians	Jewish Tunisians	French	Italian Tunisians	Maltese	Total
1921	778	1,540	772	2,449 (40,8%)	381	5,997
1926	1,998	2,074	1,264	2,921 (33,8%)	299	8,653
1931	2,274	843	2,233	3,476 (37,5%)	332	9,260
1936	2,343	1,668	2,713	3,801 (35,0%)	265	10,862
Census (1921 to 1936) of La Goletta. From: Paul Sebag, Tunis. Histoire d'une ville, ed. L'Harmattan, Parigi 1998

The presence of the Italians was fundamental in the process of cultural modernization of the country with the creation of various schools and institutes of culture, with the foundation of newspapers and reviews in Italian language and with the construction of hospitals, roads and small manufacturing industries, supported by Italian financial institutions.

The British Encyclopedia states that "...after 1862, however, the kingdom of Italy began to take a deep interest in the future of Tunisia. When the country went bankrupt in 1869, a triple control was established over Tunisian finances, with British, French and Italian controllers.' In 1880 the Italians bought the British railway from Tunis to Goletta. This and other actions excited the French to act on the secret understanding effected with the British foreign minister at the Berlin Congress. In 1881 a French force crossed the Algerian frontier under pretext of chastising the independent Khmir tribes on the north-east of the regency, and, quickly dropping the mask, advanced on the capital and compelled the Bey to accept the French protectorate. The actual conquest of the country was not effected without a serious struggle with the existing Muslim population, especially at Sfax; but all Tunisia was brought completely under French jurisdiction and administration, supported by military posts at every important point. In 1883 the new situation under the French protectorate was recognized by the British government withdrawing its consular jurisdiction in favour of the French courts, and in 1885 it ceased to be represented by a diplomatic official. The other powers followed suit, except Italy, which did not recognize the full consequences of the French protectorate until 1896..."

On 30 September 1896, Italy and France signed a treaty whereby Italy virtually recognised Tunisia as a French dependency.

== France and the Peril Italien ==
The French conquest of Tunisia in 1881, the so-called Schiaffo di Tunisi also called the Slap of Tunis, created many problems to the Tunisian Italians, who were seen as Le Peril Italien (the Italian danger) by the French colonial rulers.

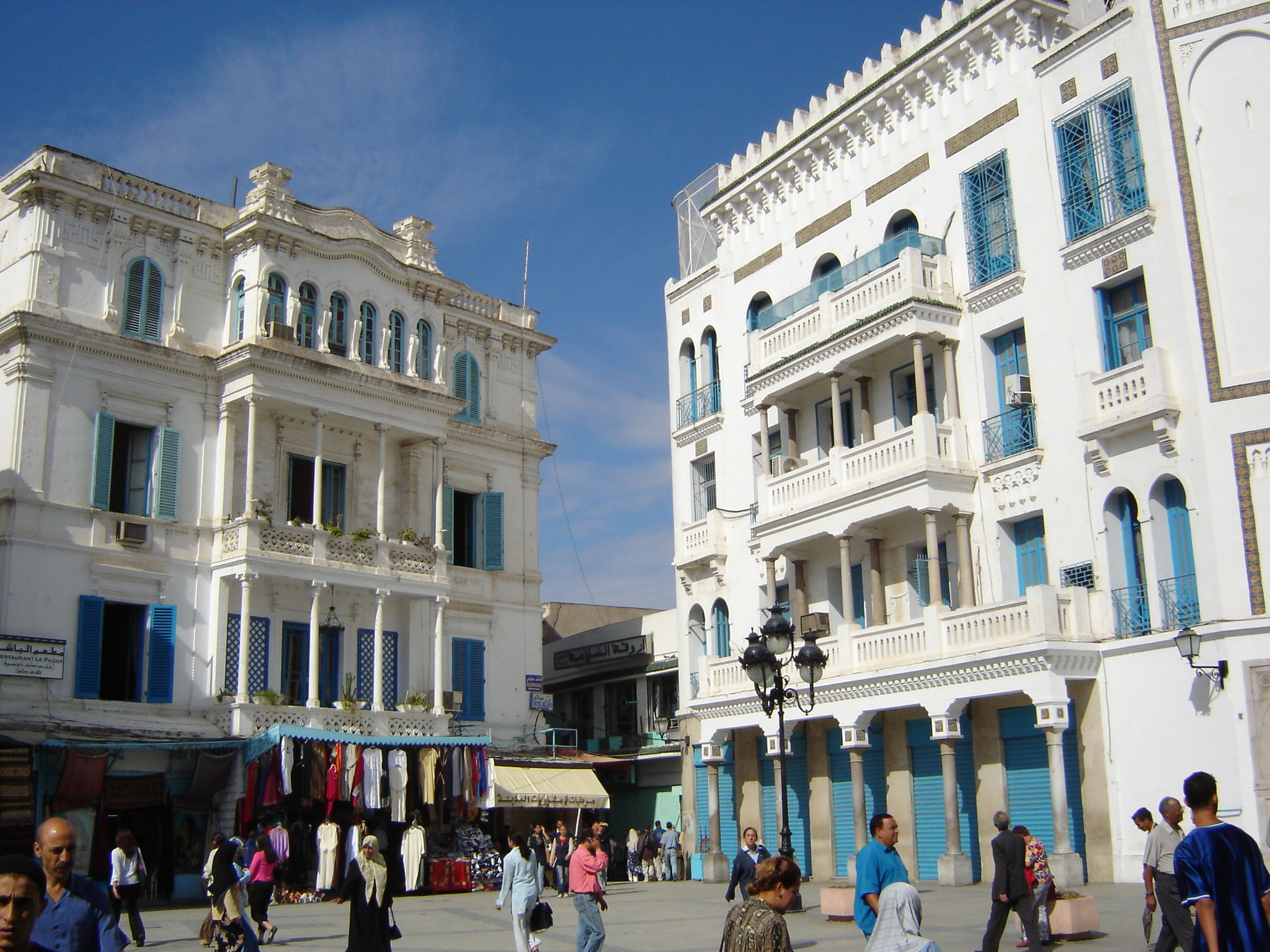
Buildings showing influence of the Italian "Liberty" architecture in Tunis

In Tunisian cities (like Tunis, Biserta and La Goulette) there were highly populated quarters called “Little Sicily” or “Little Calabria”. Italian schools, religious institutions, orphanages and hospitals were opened. The prevailing Italian presence in Tunisia, at both the popular and entrepreneurial level, was such that France set in motion with its experienced diplomacy and its sound entrepreneurial sense the process which led to the "Treaty of Bardo" and a few years later the Conventions of La Marsa, which rendered Tunisia a Protectorate of France in 1881.

In this way France began its policy of economic and cultural expansion in Tunisia, opening free schools, spreading the French language and allowing, on request, French citizenship to foreign residents. Some Sicilians become French: in the 1926 Census there were 30,000 French "of foreign language" in Tunisia. For example, attending free French schools, Mario Scalesi, the son of poor Sicilian emigrants, became a French speaker and in French wrote Les poèmes d’un maudit ("The poems of one damned") and was thus the first francophone poet from the Maghreb.

Even under the Protectorate the emigration of Italian workers to Tunisia continued unabated. Scalesi pinpointed that in 1910 there were 105,000 Italians in Tunisia, as against 35,000 Frenchmen, but there were only 1,167 holders of land among the former, with an aggregate of 83,000 hectares, whereas the Frenchmen include 2,395 landowners who had grabbed 700,000 hectares in the colony. A French decree of 1919 made the acquisition of real estate property practically prohibitive to the Tunisian Italians and this French attitude toward the Italians paved the way for the Mussolini's complaints in the 1920s and 1930s.

While such restrictions were imposed, historian Giuliano Fleri states that France still sought to nationalize the Italians in Tunisia as Frenchman. A decree from 1921 by the French president addressed "French nationality in the Regency of Tunis." Colonial officials and the new resident general, Lucien Saint, supported it. The decree stated that anyone born in Tunisia would receive French nationality, as long as at least one parent was also born there. This marked a significant step in integrating Tunisia into the French empire. Protectorate officials recognized that the decree effectively ended Tunisia's status as foreign land according to French law. The law mainly targeted the Italian community in Tunisia. However, it could not be enforced against Italian nationals initially: Rome quickly invoked the 1896 Franco-Italian agreements that defined the legal status of Italian migrants there. To bypass these limitations, the French issued a new naturalization decree in 1923 that more directly addressed the Italian population. This decree included provisions that were quite lenient for the time. Europeans needed only three years of residence, whether in Tunisia or anywhere in French territory, to qualify. The application process had no fees. Documentary requirements were reduced to the essentials. Those who gained French nationality through this process were also exempt from military service.

With the rise of Benito Mussolini, the contrasts between Rome and Paris were sharpened also because the Italians of Tunisia showed themselves to be very sensitive to the fascist propaganda and many of them joined in compact form the nationalistic ideals of the Fascism of the "Duce".

Indeed, the Tunisian Italians showed "to be defiantly nationalistic and robustly resistant to amalgamation" and many of them refused – often vehemently – to be naturalized by the French authorities.

== Italian fascist pressure ==
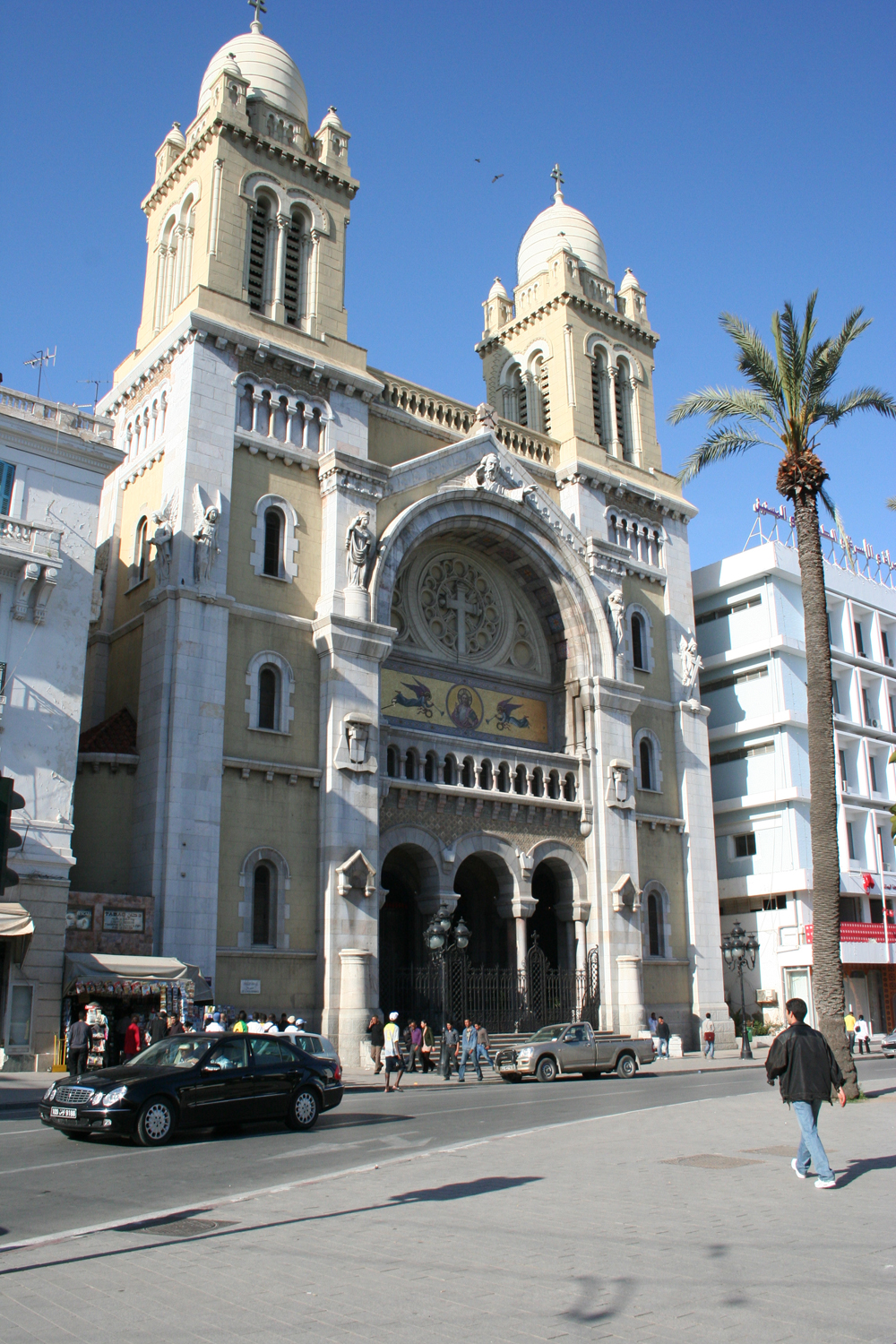
Tunis Catholic cathedral, built in Roman-Byzantine style.

The fact that the French government promoted actively the French citizenship between the Italians in Tunisia was one of the main reasons of the direct intervention of Mussolini in the Tunisian problems. From 1910 to 1926, the Italians were reduced by this French policy of assimilation from 105,000 to fewer than 90,000.

In the 1926 census of the Tunisian colony, there were 173,281 Europeans, of which 89,216 were Italians, 71,020 French and 8,396 Maltese. Indeed, this was a relative majority that prompted Laura Davi (in his Memoires italiennes en Tunisie of 1936) to write that "La Tunisia è una colonia italiana amministrata da funzionari francesi" (Tunisia is an Italian colony administered by French managers).

Initially, during the 1920s, fascists promoted only the defense of the national and social rights of the Italians of Tunisia against potential assimilation by France. Mussolini opened some financial institutions and Italian banks (like the Banca siciliana) and some Italian newspapers (like L'Unione), but even Italian hospitals, teachers, cinemas, schools (primary and secondary) and health assistance organizations.

The March of Times (a documentary from Time magazine) in 1939 stated that

"...With 1 million trained soldiers and its powerful navy, Italy is in a position to execute its plan for Mediterranean conquest. Of all Mediterranean plums, none is so tempting to land-hungry Italy as France's North African protectorate—Tunisia. For nearly 60 years, Tunisia was reasonably contented. The country is fertile—a major producer of olive oil and fertilizer, it may also have oil. Tunisia has strategic importance in a major Mediterranean war and could make Rome again master of this sea.The French employ a Muslim figurehead, who, in return for his keep, is supposed to ensure that the Muslim population is content. The fascist imperial state of Italy has sent advance men sent into Tunisia, so that there are more Italians in French Tunisia than in all African colonies. Well supplied with fascist funds, Italy's consuls and their agents have long been busy systematically undermining French influence of authority. Italian banks are generous to Italian colonists, Italians have their own schools loyal to the fascist state of Italy, and many Tunisian newspapers are subsidized by Italy. Professional agitators are actively encouraging trouble, magnifying grievances, imaginary or real. Radio programs tell Muslims that Mussolini alone is their protector. Membership in the Fascist Party is all but compulsory for every Italian male in Tunisia, and refusing to join means virtual banishment. Granted free speech and free assembly by French law, fascist leaders in Tunisia have become loud and aggressive in demanding special privileges for Italians, at the same time denouncing the French government, which tolerates their activities. Italy is making buildings that are easily convertible to military use, and building up the civil population to support a mass takeover..."

In 1940, Mussolini requested France to give Tunisia (along with Djibouti, Corsica and Nice) to Italy, when World War II was just beginning. However it was only in November 1942 that Italian troops occupied Tunisia.

== Tunisia in World War II ==
In the first months of 1943 after the fall of Vichy France, Italian schools were opened in Tunis and Biserta, while 4000 Italian Tunisians volunteered for the Italian Army. Some Italian newspapers and magazines that had been closed by the French government in the late 1930s were reopened.

After regaining Tunisia, French authorities closed all the Italian schools and newspapers. As a result of harassment by the French regime, the Italian community in Tunisia began to disappear. This process was aggravated in the 1950s when Tunisia gained independence.

In the 1946 census, the Italians in Tunisia numbered 84,935, but in 1959 (three years after many Italian settlers had left for Italy or France) there were only 51,702, and in 1969 there were fewer than 10,000. As of 2005, there are only 900, mainly concentrated in the metropolitan area of Tunis. Another 2,000 Italians, according to the Italian embassy in Tunis, are temporary residents, working as professionals and technicians for Italian companies in different areas of Tunisia.

== Legacy ==
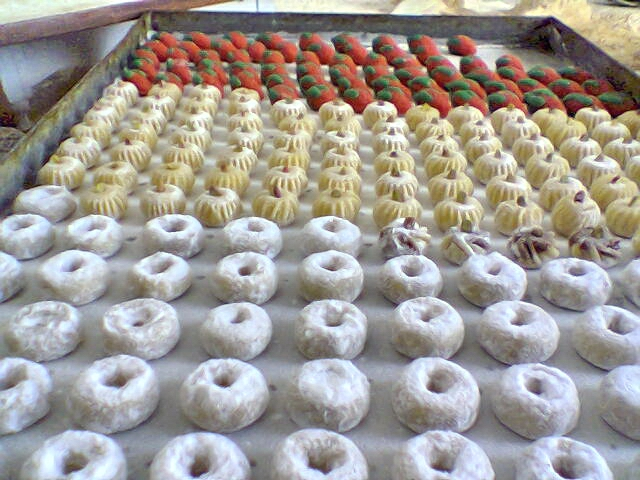
The influence of Sicilian culture can be seen in these Tunisian pastries

The legacy of the Italians in Tunisia is extensive. It goes from the construction of roads and buildings to literature and gastronomy (many Tunisian dishes are heavily influenced by the Sicilian gastronomy).

The city of La Goletta was practically created by Sicilian immigrants during the 19th century, with a quarter called "Piccola Sicilia" (Little Sicily, or "Petite Sicile" in French).

In 1926 there were 2,449 Italians living in this city near Tunis (40.8% of a total population of 5,997), while the French population only numbered 772.

The Italian international actress Claudia Cardinale, famous for the 1968 movie Once Upon a Time in the West of Sergio Leone, was born in La Goletta in 1938.

Even the Tunisian language has many words borrowed from the Italian language. For example, "fatchatta" from Italian "facciata" (facade), "trino" from Italian "treno" (train), "miziria" from Italian "miseria" (misery), "jilat" from Italian "gelato" (ice cream), "guirra" from Italian "guerra" (war), etc....

== Language and religion ==
Most Italian Tunisians speak Tunisian Arabic, French, and any of the languages of Italy (especially Italian, Sicilian and Neapolitan), while the assimilated ones speak Tunisian Arabic and French only. In religion, most are Roman Catholic Christians.

== Notable people ==
Small list of notable Tunisians of Italian descent:

- Beji Caid Essebsi, president of the Republic
- Loris Azzaro, international designer
- Claude Bartolone, former president of the French National Assembly
- Sandra Milo, international actress
- Claudia Cardinale, international actress
- Paul G. Comba, computer scientist and astronomer
- Niccolò Converti, politician and editor
- Antonio Corpora, painter
- Laura Davi, writer
- Cesare Luccio, writer
- Carlos Marcello, American Mafia don (Born in Tunis)
- Attilio Molco, lawyer and founder of the Tunisian "Società Dante Alighieri".
- Nicola Pietrangeli, international tennis champion
- Mario Scalesi, poet and writer.

== See also ==
- Kingdom of Africa
- Republic of Genoa
- Italian Empire
- Tunisian Campaign
- Italy–Tunisia relations

== Bibliography ==
- Alberti Russell, Janice. The Italian community in Tunisia, 1861-1961: a viable minority. Columbia University. Columbia, 1977.
- Bellahsen, Fabien, Daniel Rouche et Didier Bizos. Cuisine de Tunisie Ed. Auzou. Paris, 2005
- Bonura, Francesco. Gli Italiani in Tunisia ed il problema della naturalizzazione. Luce Ed. Roma, 1929
- Foerster, Robert. The Italian Emigration of Our Times. Ayer Publishing. Manchester (New Hampshire), 1969. ISBN 0-405-00522-9
- Iiams, Thomas M. (1962). Dreyfus, Diplomatists and the Dual Alliance: Gabriel Hanotaux at the Quai D'Orsay (1894 - 1898), Geneva/Paris: Librairie Droz/Librairie Minard
- Mion, Giuliano. Osservazioni sul sistema verbale dell'arabo di Tunisi. Rivista degli Studi Orientali 78. Roma, 2004.
- Moustapha Kraiem. Le fascisme et les italiens de Tunisie, 1918-1939. Cahiers du CERES. Tunis, 1969
- Priestley, Herbert. France Overseas: Study of Modern Imperialism. Routledge. Kentucky, 1967. ISBN 0-7146-1024-0
- Sebag, Paul. Tunis. Histoire d'une ville ed. L'Harmattan, Paris, 1998
- Smeaton Munro, Ion. Through Fascism to World Power: A History of the Revolution in Italy.Ayer Publishing. Manchester (New Hampshire), 1971. ISBN 0-8369-5912-4
- Watson, Bruce Allen. Exit Rommel: The Tunisian Campaign, 1942-43. Stackpole Military History Series. Mechanicsburg, PA: Stackpole Books (1999). ISBN 978-0-8117-3381-6.
