= Slap of Tunis =

1881 Italian-French political crisis

The Slap of Tunis (Schiaffo di Tunisi in Italian) was an expression used by the Italian press and historiographers from the late 19th century to describe a political crisis between the Kingdom of Italy and the French Third Republic following the French conquest of Tunisia. In 1881, the French government forcefully established a protectorate over Tunisia, which had been a colonial objective of Italy.

Meanwhile look: there's Tunis! … And the French are there, who have taken it by surprise! And tomorrow we could have them here, in our house, do you understand?

— Luigi Pirandello, I vecchi e i giovani, 1913

== Background ==
=== Italo-Tunisian Treaty of 1868 ===
Tunisia had strategic importance for the European powers when it came to ownership and controlling the flow of trade across the Straits of Sicily. For that reason, the United Kingdom would support the French claim to the protectorate and deny Italy the opportunity to develop a stranglehold over shipping routes going through Tunisia and Sicily. Italians had a long history in Tunisia, tracing back to the 16th century. The Italian language was a lingua franca among merchants, partially because of the existing Italian-Jewish merchant community.

Italy had close relations with the Bey of Tunis by receiving its own capitulation in 1868 (it), giving it most favored nation status. The international accord granted Italians in Tunisia privileges that had been conceded to several Italian states pre-unification. Civil equality was granted to Italians, along with freedom of commerce and extraterritoriality privileges for their factories. In fishing and navigation matters, they benefited from the same treatment as Tunisians. Moreover, the bey could not modify tariffs without preemptively consulting the Italian government.

=== French occupation ===
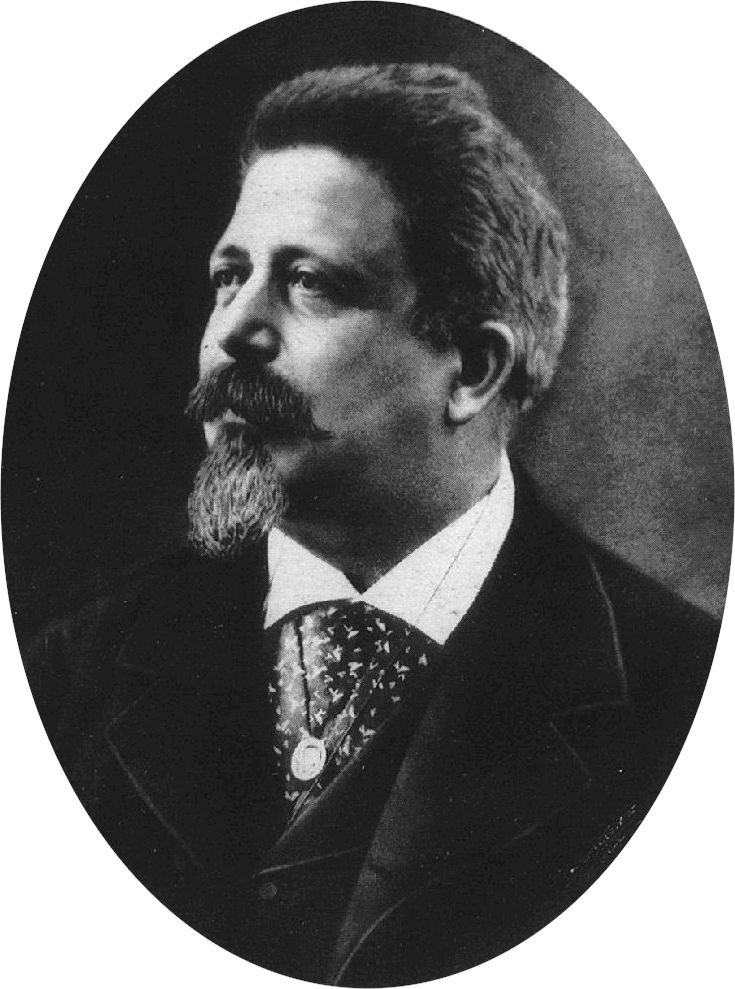
Benedetto Cairoli, the prime minister who suffered the "slap of Tunis", had to resign from his position.

The first foreign policy objective of the second government led by Benedetto Cairoli was the colonisation of Tunisia to which both France and Italy aspired. Cairoli, like Agostino Depretis before him, never considered proceeding to occupation and was generally hostile towards a militarist policy. However, they relied on a possible British opposition to an enlargement of the French sphere of influence in North Africa since, if anything, London was hostile about a single country controlling the whole Strait of Sicily.

At the beginning of 1881, France decided to militarily intervene in Tunisia. The motivations of this action were summarised by Jules Ferry, who sustained that the Italians would not have opposed it because some weeks before France had consented to a renewal of the Italo-French trade treaty, Italy was still paying the 600 million lire debt contracted with France. Primarily, Italy had been politically isolated despite its tentatives towards Berlin and Vienna. Ferry confirmed that it was Otto von Bismarck to invite Paris to act in Tunisia and noted that, in case of action, Germany would have raised no objections.

While in Italy, there was a debate about the reliability of the news about a possible French action in Tunisia, a 20,000-man expeditionary corps was preparing in Toulon. On 3 May, a French contingent of 2,000 men landed in Bizerte, followed on 11 May by the rest of the forces. The episode gave an ulterior confirmation of the Italian political isolation and rekindled the polemics that had followed the Congress of Berlin, three years earlier. The events, in effect, demonstrated the unrealistic nature of the foreign policy of Cairoli and Depretis; the impossibility of an alliance with France; and the necessity of a rapprochement with Berlin and Vienna, even if reluctantly.

However, such an inversion of the foreign policy of the last decade could not be led by the same men, and Cairoli resigned from office on 29 May 1881. Thus, the Italian Chamber of Deputies did not openly distrust him since he had de facto disappeared from the political scene.

=== Installation of the protectorate ===
Tunisia, located between Algeria to the west, a French colony since 1830, and Ottoman Cyrenaica and Tripolitania to the south-east, was then both a French and an Italian strategical objective. The bey's weakness, the intrigues of the ministers, like Mustapha Khaznadar and Mustapha Ben Ismaïl, constant pressure from European consuls, the bankruptcy of the state, become hostage of the creditors despite the effort of the reformer Hayreddin Pasha, opened doors to French occupation (hoped by German chancellor Otto von Bismarck to attract French attentions on the Mediterranean, and distract them from the Franco-German border).

On 12 May 1881, the Bardo Treaty was signed under the reign of Sadok Bey and made the Tunisian state deprive itself of the active right of legation and assign to "French diplomatic and consular agents in foreign countries […] Tunisian protection and interests". The bey, in his turn, could conclude no international act without informing France and obtaining an agreement first. But article 6 of the decree of 9 June allowed him to take part in the conclusion of international treaties.

Two years later, the Conventions of La Marsa, signed on 5 June 1883, emptied the treaty of its content and ended the sovereignty of Tunisia by forcing the bey to "proceed to administrative, judiciary and financial reforms that the French government will retain usefully". Some decisions could be taken only after receiving the approval of the French general resident in Tunisia and the French government general secretary. In the end, Europeans and Tunisians were equally represented (53 members for each community) in the Grand Council, a consultative assembly elected by universal suffrage with a two-round system.

== Consequences ==
The European powers reacted differently depending on their interests: the United Kingdom hurried to occupy Egypt, while Germany and Austria-Hungary did not express dissent about the French behaviour.

In the twenty years following the French protectorate's creation in 1881, Tunisia's Italian population grew from roughly 10,000 to over 71,000, with Sicilians making up more than 70 percent of that community. Italian-Tunisian society thus grew at an ambiguous crossroads, and regional migration patterns overlapped with colonial designs. The Italian immigrants in Tunisia would have protested and caused serious difficulties for France. However, little by little, the problem was solved, and the immigrants could later opt for French nationality and benefit from the same advantages as French colonists. Italo-French relations were dangerously fractured.

Among the hypotheses weighed by the Italian military staff, a possible invasion of the Italian Peninsula by French troops was not excluded.

== See also ==
- Benedetto Cairoli
- Conventions of La Marsa
- Italian Colonial Empire
- Protectorate
- Tunisia
- Bardo Treaty
