= Climate change in Tunisia =

Geography of Tunisia
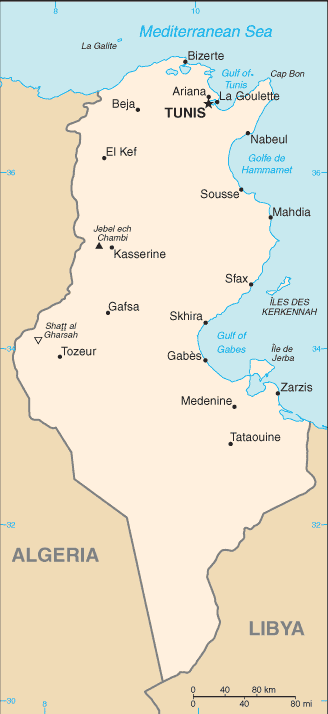
- Continent: Africa
- Region: Northern Africa
- Coordinates: 34°00′N 9°00′E
- Area: Ranked 93rd
  - Total: 163,610 km^{2} (63,170 sq mi)
- Coastline: 1,148 km (713 mi)
- Borders: Total land borders: 1,424 km Algeria 965 km, Libya 459 km

Tunisia is located in Northern Africa and is bordered by the Mediterranean Sea, Algeria, and Libya. Due to its geographical location, the country is divided into three regions: the Mediterranean region in the Northeast, the arid steppe region in the center, and a desert region in the South. When looking at the impacts of climate change, each region faces its own category of climate threats, with sea level rise jeopardizing the water quality of coastal aquifers in the Northeast and the center and Eastern regions of the country affected by variable precipitation, rising temperatures and increased extreme weather events such as floods.

Tunisia map of Köppen climate classification

Tunisia has recognized the urgent need to address climate change and is involved in international climate action. In 2016, Tunisia signed and ratified the Paris Agreement, committing to global efforts to limit global warming to well below 2 °C. In 2021, it submitted and revised an Updated Nationally Determined Contributions (NDCs), which has set an emissions reduction target of 45% below 2010 levels, by 2030. Through commitments like these Tunisia not only commits to solving its own diverse climate issues but also commits to decreasing emissions on a global scale.

== Greenhouse gas emissions ==
Tunisia generates the majority of its greenhouse gas emissions through a variety of industries. In 2022, Tunisia produced 32.5% of its CO_{2} emissions through electricity and heat production, 18.3% in industry, 30.8% through the transportation sector, 8.8% in residential settings, and around 4% through agriculture. On a global scale Tunisia remains among the lower end of Greenhouse Gas contributors, ranking at 7th in Africa for CO_{2} emissions per capita and landing at 90th globally. With transportation and electricity and heat producers contributing a combined 64% of total CO_{2} emissions, mitigation efforts in these sectors will become increasingly vital as Tunisia works to combat the variety of environmental and social issues caused across the country by climate change.

== Impacts on the environment ==
=== Temperature and weather changes ===
Tunisia is anticipated to be one of the countries most impacted by temperature change caused by global warming. The United Nations predicts that Tunisia will experience an average annual temperature of 69.3 °F between 2040 and 2059, compared to a global predicted average of 61 °F. Similarly, the Tunisian National Institute of Meteorology predicts a temperature increase of 1.8 °C by 2050 and an increase of 3 °C by 2100 in Tunisia. The dramatic increase in temperature will likely act as the most pressing climate change factor in Tunisia and directly impact human health with potential to generate up to two dozen climate related deaths in the Nabeul region, due to its position along the Mediterranean coast, as soon as 2020-2039.

=== Water Resources ===
Climate change exacerbates the issue of water security in Tunisia. The country relies heavily on coastal groundwater resources to support both irrigated agriculture and the drinking water supply. Unsustainable pumping practices, such as pumping beyond a renewable capacity, have depleted the groundwater at unsustainable rates and led to seawater intrusion in aquifers. Overexploitation of groundwater paired with the threat of sea level rise in the Mediterranean Sea, exacerbated by climate change, increases the rate at which salt water begins to infiltrate aquifers, making the water unusable.

Globally, Tunisia has consistently been acknowledged as one of the most water stressed countries, ranking at twentieth most stressed in a World Resource Institute assessment. In the past several years, Tunisia has seen a stark decrease in rainfall following a drought that lasted from 2017 to 2020. With 110 million cubic meters of rain from September 2022 to March 2023, average rainfall saw a significant decline compared to an annual average of 520 million cubic meters prior to 2020. Because of a combination of groundwater depletion, quality degradation, and a predicted increased drinking water demand, Tunisia is expected to lose 75% of its coastal water resources by 2050.

Drinking water scarcity remains a looming threat for people living in Tunisia. The United Nations predicts Tunisia to experience a 38% increase in drinking water demand, while simultaneously seeing a decrease between 31% and 61% of renewable water resources by 2100. The country experienced historic water shortages in 2023, causing the Tunisian government to implement water rationing for the first time in several areas including Hammamet, Sousse, Monastir, Mahdia, and Sfax.

== Impacts on people ==
=== Agriculture ===
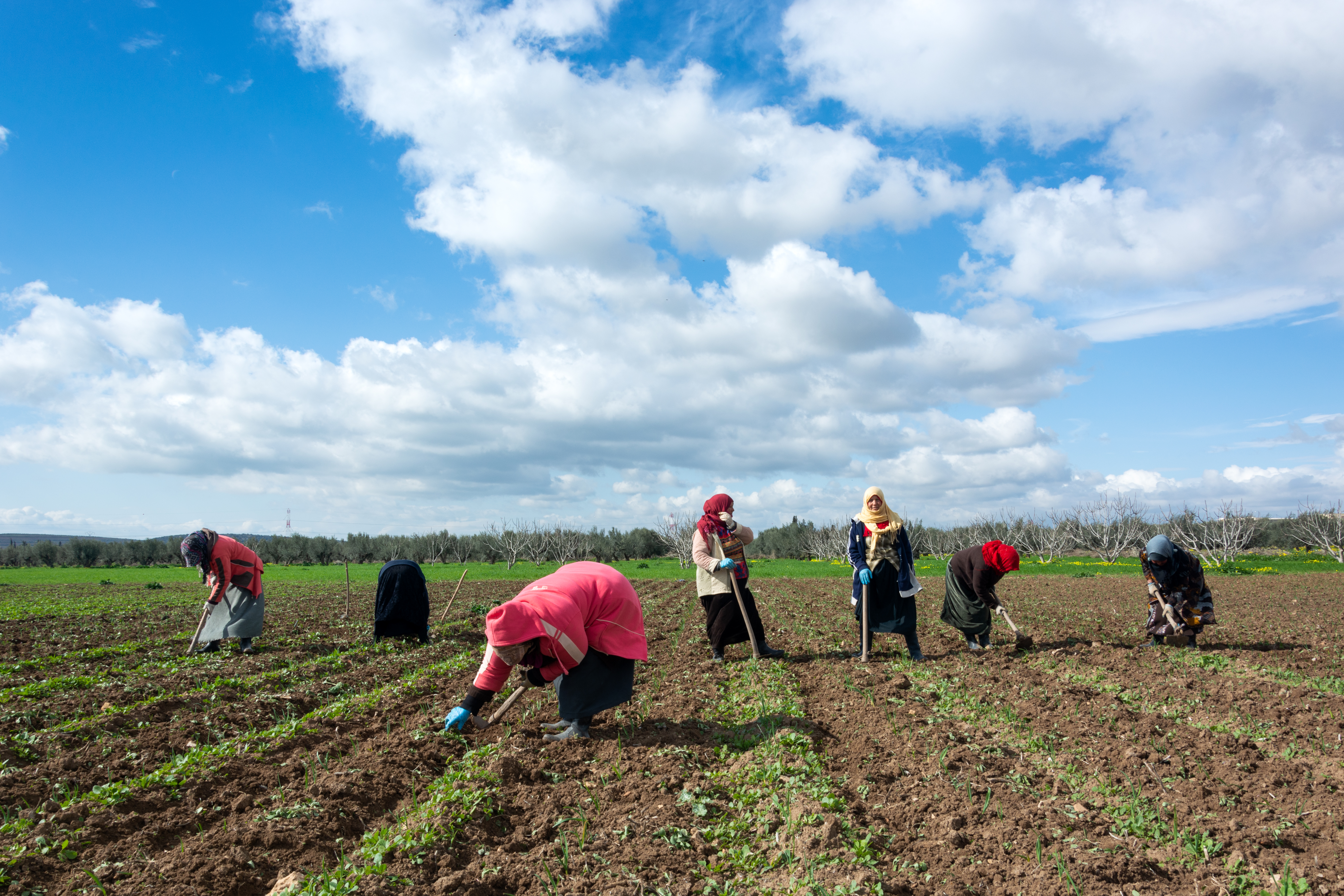
Tunisian women working in an agriculture field

Tunisia relies heavily on rain-fed crops to sustain their agricultural sector and rural communities. Agriculture is a key industry in Tunisia, accounting for 10% of their GDP in 2022 and responsible for 14% of the country's workforce. However, as climate change impacts local weather patterns, Tunisia can expect to experience higher rates of drought, decreasing crop-yields and creating issues of food production.

Major crops in Tunisia such as wheat, barley, and olive can expect to be most heavily impacted by the increased drought. The country has already experienced a decrease in 12% of agricultural production from 2000 to 2017. Issues in agricultural production can result in food scarcity issues among Tunisian citizens. A January 2023 poll found 73% of Tunisians reported being "somewhat concerned" or "very concerned" about their ability to provide their household with food in the next six months.

Crop-yields in Tunisia are also impacted by soil degradation. Across the country an estimated 70% of land is impacted by erosion, salinization, and nutrient depletion. This process is heavily sped-up by increasing temperatures as the reduction of soil moisture and erosion rates are directly impacted by heat.

As already 75% of agriculture land in Tunisia faces desertification, women farmers heavily suffer from the devastating effects of climate change.

=== Fisheries ===
In addition to agriculture, fisheries are crucial to Tunisia' s GDP, food security, and the livelihood of coastal communities. Climate change poses a large threat to the resilience of marine ecosystems globally, but especially in the Mediterranean Sea which represents 7.5% of the world's worlds marine fauna, and 18% of the worlds marine flora, while only accounting for 0.7% of the worlds ocean area, creating high concentrations of biodiversity in the region. The temperatures in the Mediterranean Sea are rising 25% faster than in the rest of the ocean on average, which puts the marine ecosystems that support the production of fisheries in Tunisia at risk of collapsing.

=== Tourism ===
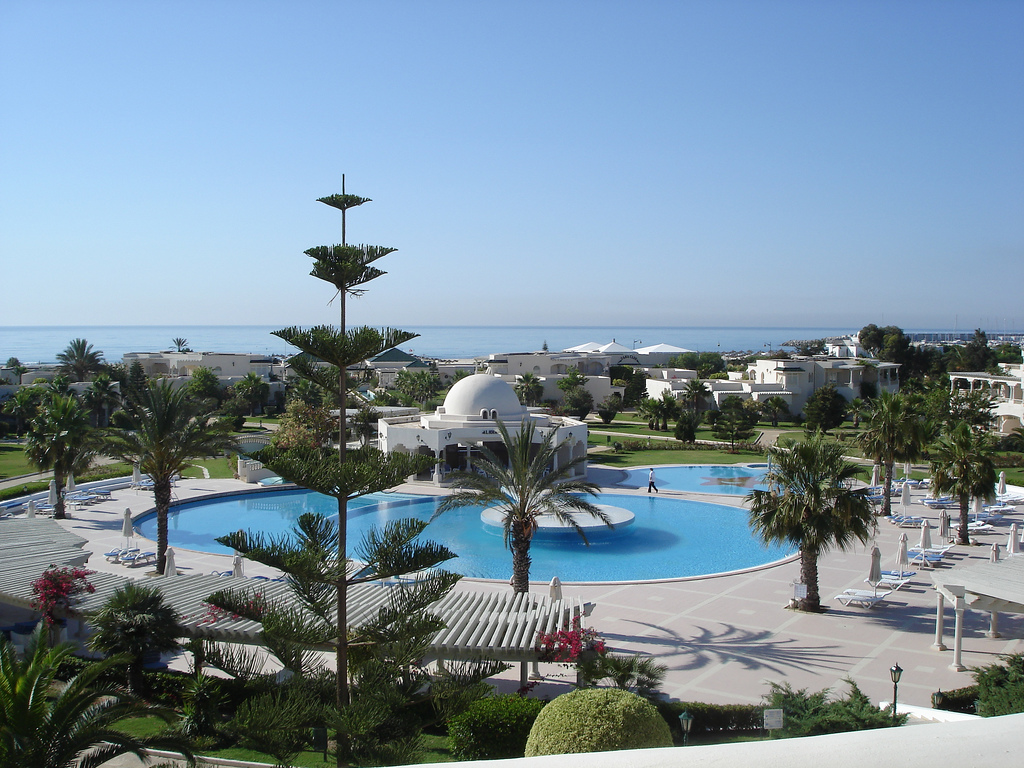
Tunisian Resort on Mediterranean Coast

Tourism acts as a major player in Tunisias national and regional economies. In 2024, tourism was projected to contribute 23 billion Tunisian Dinar and accounts for 14% of overall economic production across the country. Tourism also acts as a primary sector for job growth, with a 3.9% increase year-to-year, predicted to account for 418,000 jobs in 2024. Tourism in Tunisia is reliant on its geographic diversity, with tourism focused mainly in the mountainous and coastal regions. Climate change is expected to impact coastal tourism as sea levels rise and beaches erode. Furthermore, as extreme weather becomes more frequent, events such as sea surges and storms are expected to further amplify the deterioration of Tunisias coasts, decreasing the potential for tourism in coastal areas.

In the mountainous regions, Tunisia’s ski resorts, such as those in the Kroumirie Mountains, depend on a stable winter climate. However, rising temperatures are expected to shorten the winter season, reducing snowfall and, consequently, the potential for winter sports such as skiing, snowboarding, and other winter sports. As the length and quality of the winter season diminish, Tunisia may see a reduction in the number of tourists visiting for winter sports, affecting not only the resorts but also the surrounding local economies that rely on seasonal tourism.

=== Sea Level Rise ===
As mentioned above, rising sea levels, driven by global climate change, pose significant risks to Tunisia's coastal regions, leading to a range of issues that directly affect both the environment and local communities. As sea levels rise, coastal areas will begin to erode, which threatens to submerge or severely damage critical infrastructure, including tourism centers and residential areas. This will have a heavy impact on Tunisia, where tourism plays a vital role in the national economy by contributing to the GDP and providing employment.

Approximately 68% of Tunisia's coastline is classified as moderately to very highly vulnerable to the effects of sea level rise and coastal erosion. Projections anticipate sea levels could rise between 30 and 50 centimeters by the end of the 21st century. This rise, combined with more frequent and intense storm surges, will exemplify the erosion of coastal areas, leading to further loss of land, property, and cultural heritage sites.

Beyond physical damage to coastal areas, rising sea levels also threaten freshwater resources through saltwater intrusion into coastal aquifers. Tunisia, already facing significant water scarcity, relies heavily on underground freshwater reserves for drinking water and irrigation. As sea levels rise, saltwater can seep into these groundwater supplies, making them undrinkable and unsuitable for agricultural use. The intrusion of salt water will worsen the country’s water shortage, impacting agriculture - particularly in the coastal plains - and reducing the availability of clean drinking water for growing urban populations. With already diminishing freshwater sources, saltwater intrusion will place additional pressure on Tunisia's water supply, affecting food security and public health.

== Mitigation ==
=== Government Efforts ===
The Tunisian Government aims to achieve 35% renewable energy by 2030 compared to the 3% it holds now. Additionally, it plans for renewable sources to cover 50% of the country’s electricity needs by 2035, and 100% by 2050. These targets represent 75% of Tunisia's commitment to reducing greenhouse gas (GHG) emissions. While these climate goals are ambitious, the government’s methods for achieving them are heavily criticized. Specifically, there have been concerns over the forced relocation of residents and the confiscation of agricultural land for renewable energy projects, such as solar and wind farms.

In order to reach their climate goals, the Tunisian government has continued to reform their policy planning process following the 2011 revolution, emphasizing a participatory process and empowering local authorities. The implementation of the Local Authorities Code, adopted April 2018, gives power to local government to make decisions about environmental management. Beginning 2021, Tunisia has taken strides towards developing a National Adaptation Plan, which centers land use planning and economic and social development.

According to the Updated Nationally Determined Contribution (NDC) submitted in 2021, Tunisia has set a target to reduce emissions by 13% by 2030 compared to a business-as-usual scenario, with an additional 47% reduction achievable dependent on international support. The revised NDCs also outline key actions in sectors such as renewable energy, energy efficiency, agriculture, and water management, focusing on both mitigation and adaptation strategies. The agri-food sector is a critical part of Tunisia's economy and is especially vulnerable to climate change impacts. These threats to food production and water availability could jeopardize livelihoods and food security, underscoring the importance of these climate goals.

=== Civilian Efforts ===
Communities in Tunisia have come together to develop creative mitigation plans such as harvesting rainwater, waste recycling, to energy saving street-lights. The UN Capital Development Fund has worked with the Tunisian government to strengthen local mitigation efforts through Local Climate Adaptive Living Facility (LoCAL), which is funding from the European Union. This allows for money to be channeled into bottom-up approaches to mitigation climate change effects and allows communities to implement mitigation efforts on a case to case basis. The LoCAL Facility gives climate finance to local governments in the form of Performance Based Climate Resilience Grants (PBCRGs). The funds incentivize climate-proof local development and encourage local participation and projects.

== Adaptation ==
Although Tunisia is labeled as being a climate hot spot, Tunisian President Kris Saied has failed in putting climate adaptation as a priority. His government has been slow in implementing effective climate policies and has limited investment in climate resilience, particularly in the agriculture sector and water management. Efforts in environmental governance and climate change has taken the backseat to the political instability in Tunisia.

Even so, there have been adaptations to climate change that have mainly focuses on managing water scarcity, coastal erosion from sea level rise, and adapting to extreme weather events. Tunisia developed the National Adaptation Plan (NAP) to guide climate resilience in various sectors such as energy, water, agriculture, and health. Tunisia also branches out to international funding to support their initiatives.

== International cooperation ==
The Tunisian Government has made continuously large strides to affirming their commitment to reaching climate goals. With the ratification of the Kyoto Protocol in January 2003, Tunisia made its promise alongside other countries to limit greenhouse gas emissions. The country later affirmed its climate vows with the signing of the Paris Agreement in April 2016 and later ratifying it in 2017, a global commitment which ensures that global temperatures don't warm past 2 °C.
