= French conquest of Tunisia =

Conquest of Tunisia by the French

- Part of the Scramble for Africa
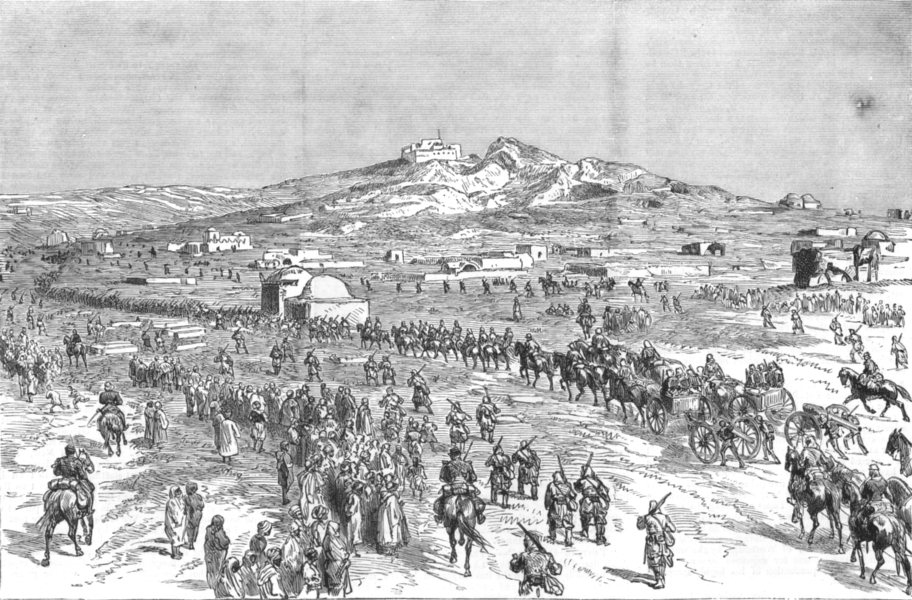
- Capture of Tunis in October 1881
Date	28 April – 23 December 1881
Location	Tunisia
Result	French victory: Tunisia becomes a French protectorate

Belligerents
France	Ottoman Beylik of Tunisia

Commanders and leaders
(France) Forgemol de Bostquénard (France) Jules Aimé Bréart	Muhammad III; Ali III

Strength
28,000 men	Unknown

Casualties and losses
Unknown	Unknown

The French conquest of Tunisia occurred in two phases in 1881: the first (28 April – 12 May) consisting of the invasion and securing of the country before the signing of a treaty of protection, and the second (10 June – 28 October) consisting of the suppression of a rebellion. The French protectorate of Tunisia that was established lasted until the independence of Tunisia on 20 March 1956.

== Context ==
=== Early contacts ===
Tunisia had been a province of the Ottoman Empire since the Conquest of Tunis (1574), although with great autonomy under the authority of a Bey. In 1770, Brigadier Rafélis de Broves bombarded the cities of Bizerte, Porto Farina and Monastir in retaliation for acts of piracy. In the 19th century Tunisian commercial contacts with Europe were numerous, and there was a population of French, Italian and British expatriates in the country, that was represented by Consulates. France had also made a major loan to Tunisia in the mid-19th century. The Tunisian government was weak, with an inefficient tax system that only brought it one-fifth of the tax collected. The economy was crippled with a series of droughts and the elimination of corsairs by Western fleets. Lastly, Tunisians had little control on foreign trade as old 16th century agreements with European powers limited custom taxes to 3%. As a result, its small industry was devastated by imports, especially in the area of textiles.

=== Colonial competition ===
Following the Franco-Prussian War of 1870–71, France's international prestige was severely damaged, and both Italy and the United Kingdom attempted to reinforce their influence in Tunisia. The Italian representative failed through clumsiness, but the British representative Sir Richard Wood was more successful. In order to limit French influence, Wood obtained the reinstatement of Tunisia as a province of the Ottoman Empire in 1871, although the region's autonomy was also guaranteed. Great Britain continued to try to exert influence through commercial ventures, but these were not successful. There were also various Tunisian land ownership disputes among France, Britain and Italy.

The French wished to take control of Tunisia, which neighboured their existing colony of Algeria, and to suppress Italian and British influence there. At the Congress of Berlin in 1878, a diplomatic arrangement was made for France to take over Tunisia while Great Britain obtained control of Cyprus from the Ottomans. Subsequently, the use of Tunisian territory as a sanctuary by rebel Khroumir bands gave a pretext for the military intervention.

== Occupation ==
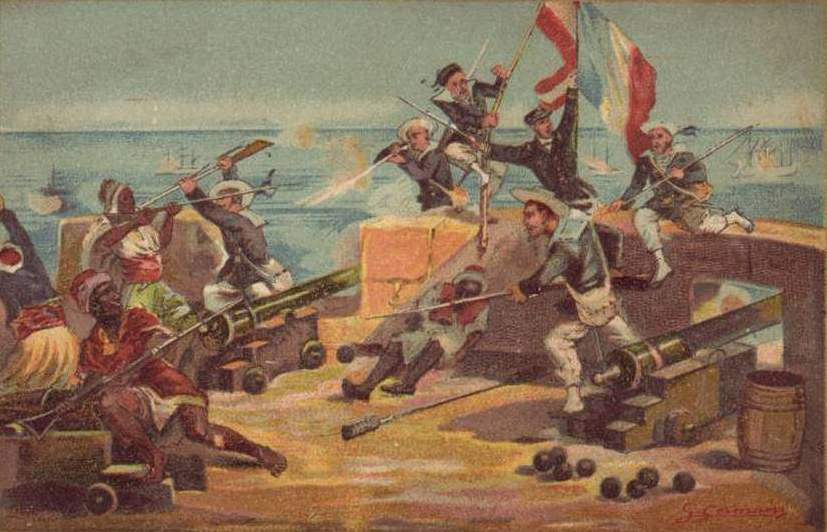
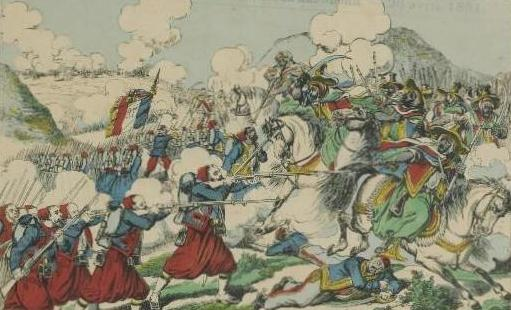
Capture of Sfax by French troops (top), and the Battle of Djebel Haddeda (bottom), 1881

On 28 April 1881, 28,000 men under General Forgemol de Bostquénard entered Tunisia. On 1 May, the city of Bizerte surrendered to the 8,000 men of Jules Aimé Bréart, who then continued to Tunis.

Bréart entered Tunis between May 3 and May 6, 1881. He had in his possession the Bardo Treaty establishing a protectorate on Tunis, which had just been cabled to him by the French government. On May 11, Bréart, the general consul Théodore Roustan, and General Pierre Léon Mauraud, accompanied by an armed escort, presented the treaty to Muhammad III as-Sadiq (Sadok Bey), Bey of Tunis between 1859 and 1881, who resided in Ksar Saïd. Surprised, Sadok Bey requested several hours for reflection, and immediately gathered his cabinet. Some of its members insisted that the bey should escape towards Kairouan to organize resistance, but Sadok Bey decided to accept the protectorate. The Bardo Treaty was signed by both parties on 12 May 1881.

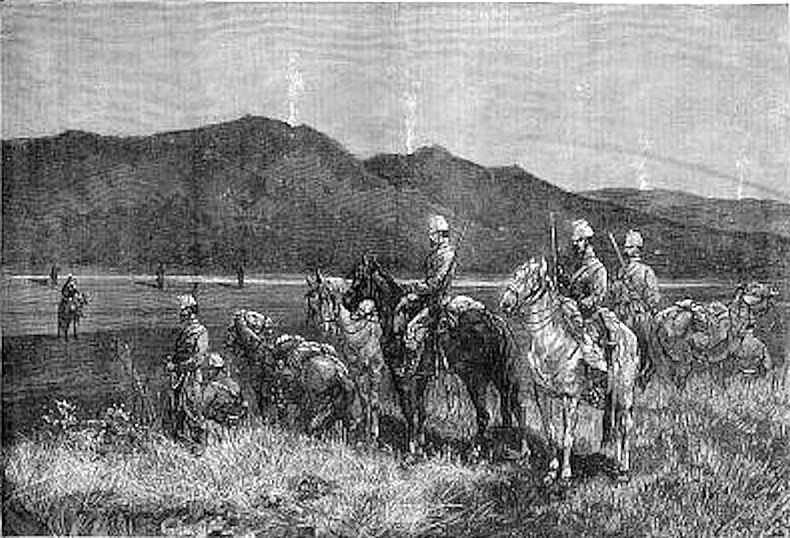
French Chasseurs d'Afrique on outpost in Tunis, 1881

An insurrection soon broke out in the south on 10 June 1881, and then in Sfax. 6 ironclads were dispatched from Toulon (Colbert, Friedland, Marengo, Trident, Revanche, and Surveillante) to join the French Navy ships in Tunisian waters. In Sfax, three ironclads from the Division of the Levant were already present (Alma, Reine Blanche, and La Galissonnière), together with four cannon boats. Sfax was bombarded, and on 16 July the city was invested after hard fighting, with 7 dead and 32 wounded for the French. At Kairouan 32,000 men, 6,000 horses and 20,000 tons of supplies and material were landed. Kairouan was taken without a fight on 28 October 1881.

== Consequences ==
Great Britain and Germany silently approved the invasion of the country, while Italy protested in vain.

Tunisia thus became a French protectorate, with great powers for the French, the French Resident being simultaneously Prime Minister, controller of the State's finances, and Commander in Chief of its armed forces. In 1882, Paul Cambon energetically took advantage of his position as Resident, leaving the Bey essentially powerless, and in effect administering Tunisia as another French colony. The French established an important naval base at Bizerte in 1898.

Italy would respond with the 1911–12 Italo-Turkish War leading to the Italian occupation of Libya.

== See also ==
- History of French-era Tunisia
- French conquest of Algeria
- French conquest of Morocco

== Bibliography ==
- Aldrich, Robert (15 Sep 1996), Greater France: a history of French overseas expansion, European Studies, Basingstoke-London: Palgrave Macmillan, ISBN 978-0-312-16000-5
- Randier (2006), La Royale, Babouji, ISBN 2-35261-022-2.
