= French ironclad Reine Blanche =

French Alma-class ironclad

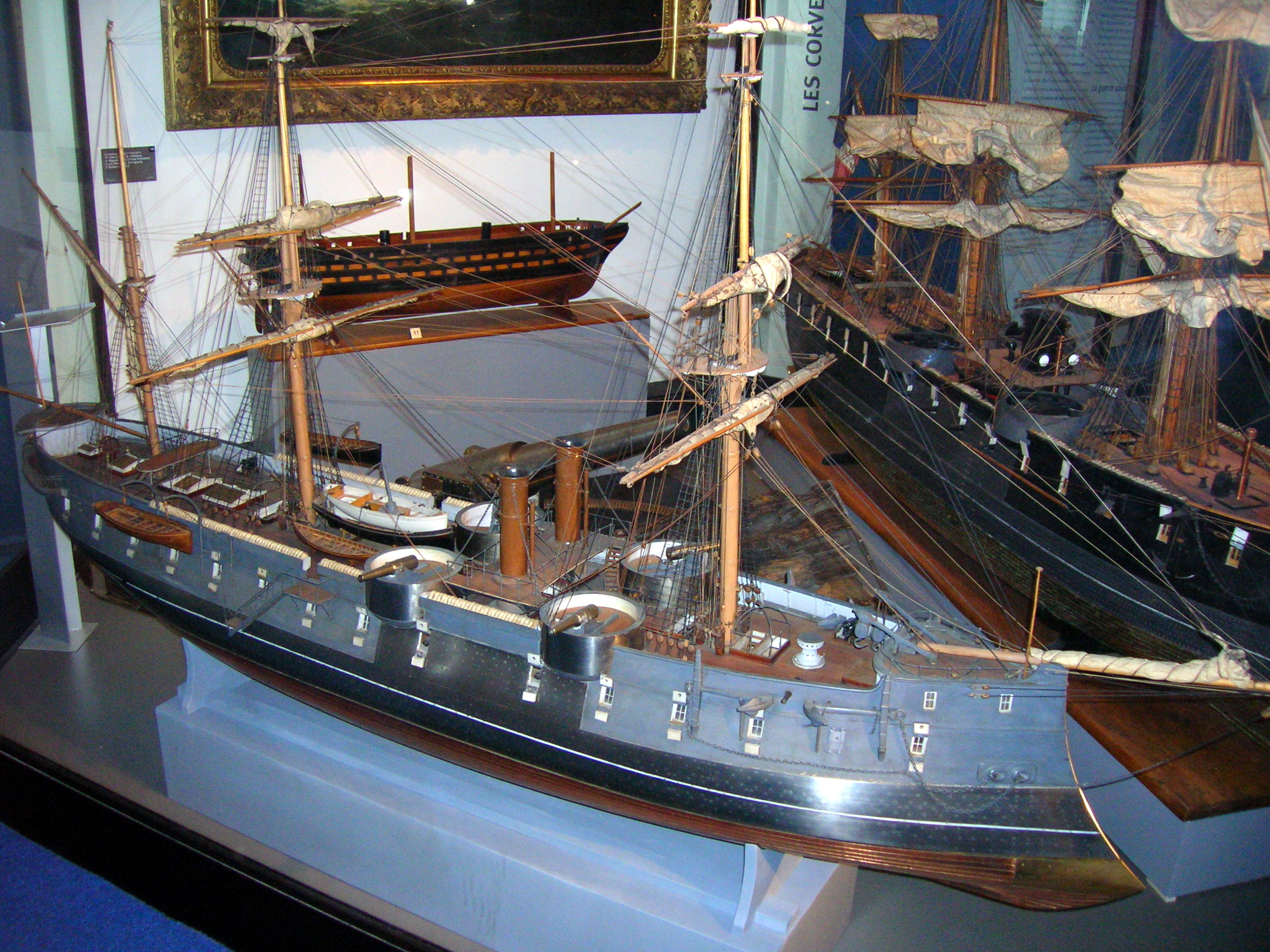
- Model of Reine Blanche's sister, Jeanne d'Arc, on display at the Musée de la Marine in Paris, before the rear barbettes were removed

History

France
- Name: Reine Blanche
- Namesake: Blanche of Castile Queen of France
- Builder: Lorient
- Laid down: 1865
- Launched: 10 March 1868
- Commissioned: 1870
- Fate: Condemned 12 November 1884

General characteristics
- Class & type: Alma-class ironclad
- Displacement: 3,768 t (3,708 long tons)
- Length: 69.02 m (226 ft 5 in)
- Beam: 13.94 m (45 ft 9 in)
- Draft: 6.48 m (21 ft 3 in) (mean)
- Installed power: 4 boilers; 1,860 ihp (1,390 kW)
- Propulsion: 1 shaft, 1 steam engine
- Sail plan: Barque-rig
- Speed: 11 knots (20 km/h; 13 mph)
- Range: 1,610 nautical miles (2,980 km; 1,850 mi) at 10 knots (19 km/h; 12 mph)
- Complement: 316
- Armament: 6 × single 194 mm (7.6 in) Mle 1864 guns; 4 × single 120 mm (4.7 in) guns
- Armor: Belt: 150 mm (5.9 in); Battery: 120 mm (4.7 in); Barbettes: 100 mm (3.9 in); Bulkheads: 120 mm (4.7 in)

The French ironclad Reine Blanche was a wooden-hulled armored corvette built for the French Navy in the late 1860s as an improvement over the armored corvette Belliqueuse. She played a minor role in the Franco-Prussian War of 1870–1871 and was accidentally rammed by one of her sister ships in 1877. The ship bombarded the port of Sfax during the French occupation of Tunisia in 1881 before being sent to the Pacific in 1884. She quickly returned to port with worn-out boilers and was condemned later that year.

== Design and description ==
The Alma-class ironclads (Note: Ironclad is the all-encompassing term for armored warships of this period. Armored corvettes were originally designed for the same role as traditional wooden corvettes, but this rapidly changed as the size and expense of these ships caused them to be used as second-class armored ships.) were designed as improved versions of the armored corvette Belliqueuse, suited for foreign deployments. Unlike their predecessor, the Alma-class ships were true central battery ironclads as they were fitted with armored transverse bulkheads. Like most ironclads of their era, they were equipped with a metal-reinforced ram.

Reine Blanche measured 69.02 meters (226 ft 5 in) between perpendiculars, with a beam of 13.94 meters (45 ft 9 in). She had a mean draft of 6.48 meters (21 ft 3 in) and displaced 3,768 metric tons (3,708 long tons). Her crew numbered 316 officers and men.

=== Propulsion ===
The ship had a single horizontal return connecting-rod steam engine driving a single propeller. Her engine was powered by four oval boilers. On sea trials the engine produced 1,860 indicated horsepower (1,390 kW) and the ship reached 11.72 knots (21.71 km/h; 13.49 mph). Reine Blanche carried 250 metric tons (250 long tons) of coal, allowing the ship to steam for 1,610 nautical miles (2,980 km; 1,850 mi) at a speed of 10 knots (19 km/h; 12 mph). She was barque-rigged and had a sail area of 1,454 square meters (15,650 sq ft).

=== Armament ===
Reine Blanche mounted her four 194-millimeter (7.6 in) Modèle 1864 breech-loading guns in the central battery on the battery deck. The other two 194-millimeter guns were mounted in barbettes on the upper deck, sponsoned out over the sides of the ship. The four 120-millimeter (4.7 in) guns were also mounted on the upper deck. She may have exchanged her Mle 1864 guns for Mle 1870 guns. The armor-piercing shell of the 20-caliber Mle 1870 gun weighed 165.3 pounds (75 kg) while the gun itself weighed 7.83 long tons (7.96 t). The gun fired its shell at a muzzle velocity of 1,739 ft/s (530 m/s) and was credited with the ability to penetrate a nominal 12.5 inches (320 mm) of wrought iron armour at the muzzle. The guns could fire both solid shot and explosive shells.

=== Armor ===
Reine Blanche had a complete 150-millimeter (5.9 in) wrought iron waterline belt, approximately 2.4 meters (7.9 ft) high. The sides of the battery itself were armored with 120 millimeters (4.7 in) of wrought iron and the ends of the battery were closed by bulkheads of the same thickness. The barbette armor was 100 millimeters (3.9 in) thick, backed by 240 millimeters (9.4 in) of wood. The unarmored portions of her sides were protected by 15-millimeter (0.6 in) iron plates.

== Service ==
Reine Blanche was laid down at Lorient in 1865 and launched on 10 March 1868. The ship began her sea trials on 15 April 1869 and was put into reserve at Brest after they were completed. She was commissioned on 20 July 1870 and made one cruise to the Shetland Islands during the Franco-Prussian War before she was placed in reserve again on 20 September. Reine Blanche was recommissioned in July 1871 as flagship of the second division of the Evolutionary Squadron. During the Cantonal Revolution Reine Blanche and her sister Thétis spent much of September–October 1873 in the port of Cartagena, Spain, where they could protect French citizens. She was reduced to reserve on 1 February 1876 and recommissioned in April 1877.

On 3 July 1877, she was accidentally rammed by Thétis off the Îles d'Hyères, Var and had to be run ashore to prevent her from sinking. Reine Blanche was placed back into reserve in 1878. She was recommissioned on 15 April 1879 for service with the Levant Squadron. From 5–16 July 1881 Reine Blanche bombarded the Tunisian port of Sfax as part of the French occupation of Tunisia. The ship was named as the flagship of the Pacific Squadron on 20 January 1884 under command of Rear Admiral Franquet, but she returned to Cherbourg on 22 May 1884 with worn-out boilers and her hull in poor shape. Reine Blanche was paid off and condemned on 12 November 1884.
