= Léonard-Léopold Forgemol de Bostquénard =

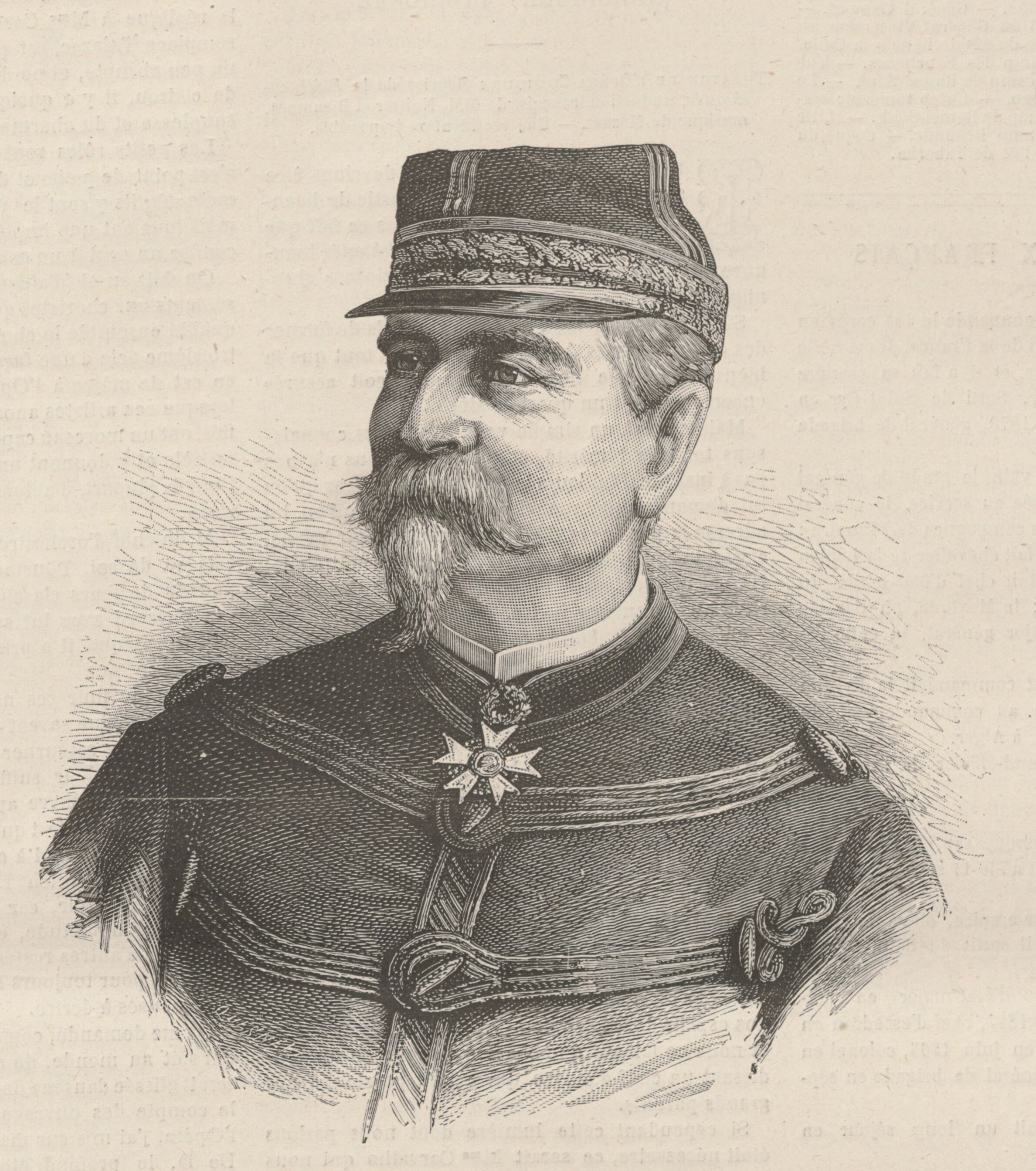
- Portrait published on Le Monde illustré, 1881
- Born: 17 September 1821; Azerables
- Died: 28 November 1897 (aged 76); Versailles
- Military career
- Allegiance: France
- Branch: Army
- Service years: 1839–1894
- Rank: General of division
- Commands: 11th Army Corps
- Conflicts: Franco-Prussian War; French conquest of Tunisia
- Awards: Legion of Honour

Léonard-Léopold Forgemol de Bostquénard (17 September 1821 – 28 November 1897) was a French general who served in the Franco-Prussian War and the French conquest of Tunisia.

== Biography ==
Léonard-Léopold Forgemol de Bostquénard was born on 17 September 1821 at Azerables, in the Creuse department. He graduated from the military school of Saint-Cyr in 1839 and was posted to Algeria in 1840 as an infantry lieutenant, eventually attaining the rank of colonel. At the start of the Franco-Prussian War, in 1870, he was recalled to France.

Provisionally promoted to brigade general on January 30, 1871, Forgemol was confirmed in this rank the following September. He commanded a subdivision of the department of Aisne with the subsidiary role of secretary of the War Council and in 1878, he was put in military command of the department of Seine-et-Oise. Forgemol was promoted to general of division on March 4, 1879. An injury that he received during the war obliged him to wear a large silver plastron over his abdomen. He was advised to retire, but replied that since he could still sit on a horse, he was still as useful on the battlefield as any other soldier.

In 1881, when he was in command of the army for the region of Constantine, Algeria, Forgemol was ordered by the government of Jules Ferry to direct the military operations in Tunisia from April to July 1881. They resulted in the establishment of a French protectorate under the treaties of Bardo and Marsa in 1883. Forgemol remained in Tunisia up until 1883 and oversaw a second campaign of "pacification" in the region of Kairouan. On his return to Paris, he became a staff-officer at the war ministry. He was awarded the Legion of Honour, on May 4, 1889, and received the French military medal in 1894. Forgemol served as commander of the 11th Army Corps from 1889 until his retirement in 1894. He died on 28 November 1897 at Versailles.

A commemorative plate was fixed to the wall of his modest family home at Azérables. It includes the name of his brother Jean-Jacques Hector (1819–1883), military surgeon and also a member of the Légion d’honneur.

== Bibliography ==
- Paul Henri Benjamin d' Estournelles de Constant, La politique francaise en Tunisie: le protectorat et ses origines (1854-1891), Paris : Plon, Nourrit, 1891. OCLC 67526371

== Sources ==
- Gen. de Bostquénard dead, The New York Times, 30 novembre 1897.
- Military biography and photograph
- This article is based on the equivalent article from the French Wikipedia, consulted on December 31, 2007.
