= National Tobacco and Matches Authority (Tunisia) =

- Industry: Manufacturing industry
- Founded: 1891; 134 years ago
- Headquarters: Tunis and Kairouan, Tunisia
- Products: Cigarettes, tobacco, playing cards and hunting powder
- Website: www.rnta.tn

The National Tobacco and Matches Authority (Arabic: الوكالة الوطنية للتبغ والوقيد) is a Tunisian public company with a monopoly on the manufacture and marketing of tobacco and matches in Tunisia, as well as playing cards and hunting gunpowder.

Created in 1891 under the French protectorate, it became a national company in 1964. It then merged with the Kairouan tobacco factory created in 1981. It is one of the largest Tunisian companies and employs several thousand employees, particularly in the two factories in Tunis and the one in Kairouan, as well as in the head offices of both entities.

It is associated with the Tunisian tobacco sector, purchasing the harvest of several thousand tobacco growers in the northern regions of the country (notably in the governorates of Jendouba, Béja, Bizerte and Nabeul). It produces three types of tobacco: brown tobacco, light tobacco and snuff. It also manufactures hundreds of millions of packets of cigarettes and supplies more than 10,000 retailers across the country.
