= Treaty of Bardo =

1881 treaty between France and Tunisia

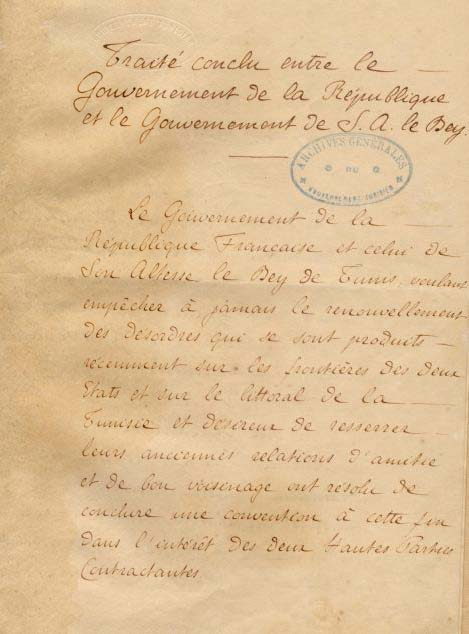
- First page of the Treaty of Bardo
- Signed: May 12, 1881

The Treaty of Bardo (French: Traité du Bardo, Arabic: معاهدة باردو) or Treaty of Ksar Saïd established a French protectorate over Tunisia that lasted until World War II. It was signed on 12 May 1881 between representatives of France and the Tunisian bey Muhammed as-Sadiq, placing Tunisia under the control of the French Resident-General.

The treaty allowed France to control certain geographical areas under the guise of re-establishing order and protecting the Bey from internal opposition and also gave France responsibility for foreign-policy decisions of Tunisia. Later, the Conventions of La Marsa of 8 June 1883 gave France a right to intervene in Tunisia's domestic affairs. Thus subject to the Resident-General’s absolute power, the country lost almost all autonomy not only in external but in practice also in internal affairs.

== Name ==
The names of the treaty originated with the residence of the Tunis court, Ksar Saïd Palace in Le Bardo, where the Husainid beys had established themselves in the early-18th century.

== Background ==
A raid on Algeria by the Tunisian Khroumir tribe had served as a pretext for French armed forces to invade Tunisia in April 1881. Jules Ferry, the French foreign minister, managed to send a French expeditionary force of approximately 36,000 troops to defeat the Khroumer tribe. The French met little resistance from either the Kroumer tribe or from as-Sadiq. Eventually, the French withdrew their forces after signing the treaty. The military occupation was stated to be temporary.

== Sources ==
- Encyclopedia of World History (2001)
