= Kroumirie =

Region in North Africa

Coordinates: 36.5833°N 8.41667°E

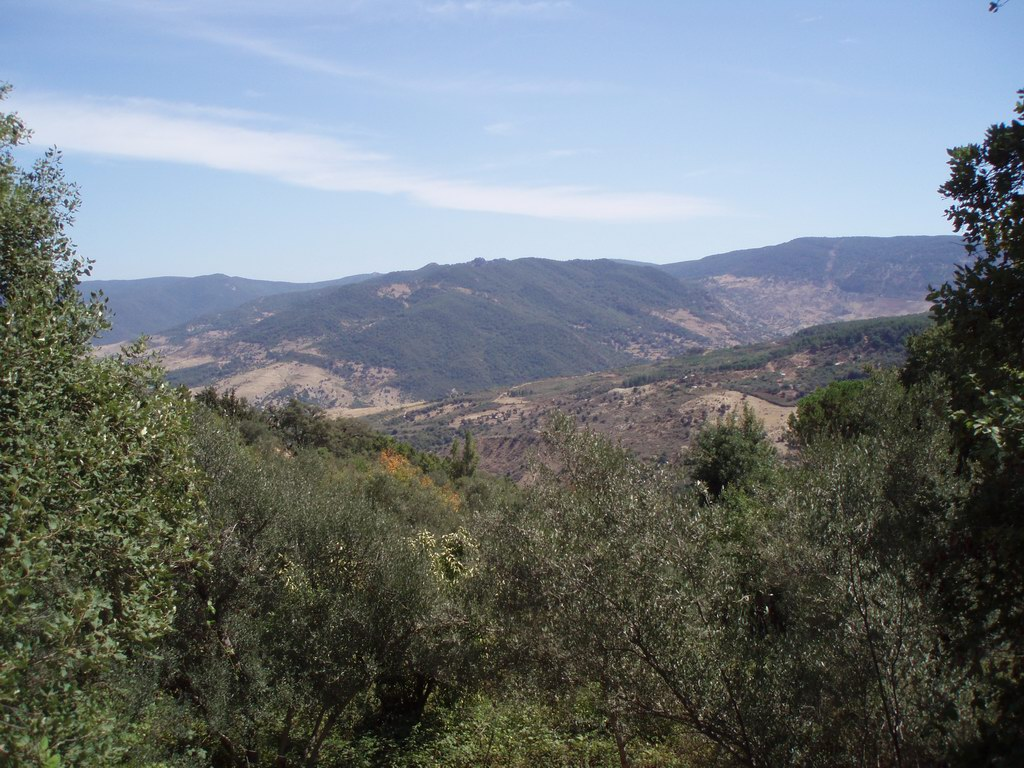
Forest of the Kroumirie

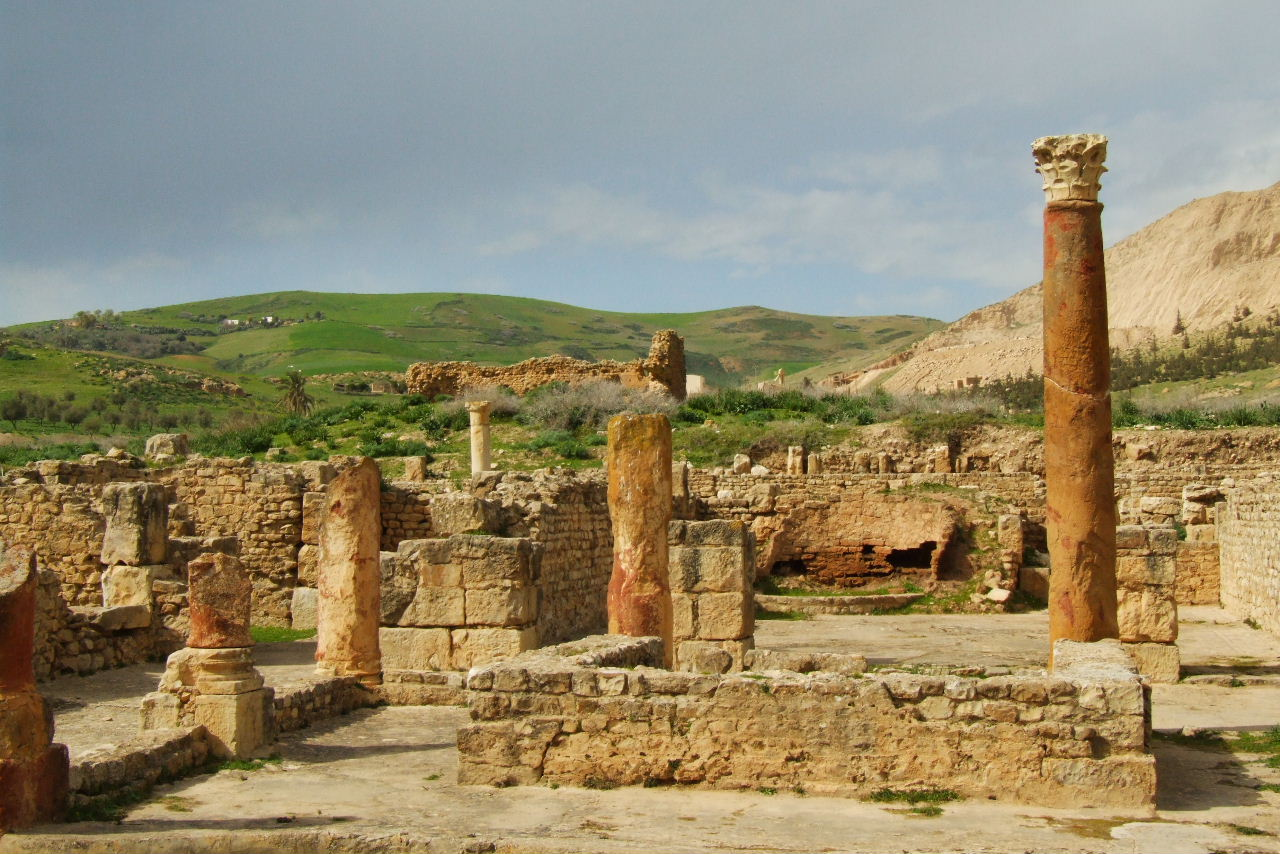
Roman city of Bulla Regia, near Jendouba, Tunisia with the Kroumirie mountains in background.

The Kroumirie (also spelled Khroumirie) (Note: From Arabic: جبال خمير, Jabal Khumayr, locally Djebel Khmīr) is a mountainous region located in northwestern Tunisia and northeastern Algeria. The region is named after its people, the Khumayr (locally Khmīr). (Note: French Khoumirs or Kroumirs)

The Kroumirie is an eastern extension of the Atlas Mountains. Depending on the definition it encompasses an area of 900 km^{2} (350 sq mi) or an area as large as 3,000 km^{2} (1,200 sq mi). It has extensive forest cover, over 70% of the trees being cork oak and 20% zean oak. Other species include wild olive and the undergrowth comprises mostly ferns. Owing to a relatively high rainfall it is the most well watered region in Tunisia (40 to 60 in [1,000 to 1,500 mm] a year). Snowfall is common at higher elevations.

In the Roman period, the Kroumirie was crossed by three important roads: that from Carthage to Hippo Regius and those from Simitthu and Vaga to Thabraca (Tabarka). The latter was the port from which the products of the mountains—lumber, wild animals, oil, wheat and minerals—were exported. The Kroumirie is completely unmentioned in written sources from the Middle Ages. The Khumayr had friendly commercial relations with the Genoese of Tabarka after 1540. Only in more modern times did it earn a reputation as a place of resistance against the forces of governments both Tunisian and foreign.
