= Société Protectrice des Animaux =

French animal protection association

Société protectrice des animaux (Society for the Protection of Animals)
- Formation: 2 December 1845
- Founder: Pierre Dumont de Monteux
- Location: France
- Methods: Lobbing investigation and legal action, and animal shelter
- Key people: Jacques de Grammont and Roland Nungesser
- Staff: 700
- Volunteers: 4,000
- Website: www.la-spa.fr

The Société Protectrice des Animaux, SPA by its acronym in French (English: Society for the Protection of Animals), is France's oldest animal protection association.

Founded on 2 December 1845 and recognized as a charitable organization in 1860, it takes in animals in distress, abandoned, lost, or mistreated. It operates 63 shelters and 7 SPA homes throughout France. Animals are taken in by the site team following abandonment, removal for mistreatment or release from a shelter. The animals (dogs, cats and NACs [nouveaux animaux de compagnie]: new pets) are identified, sterilized, vaccinated, housed, treated, trained and socialized before being put up for adoption.

It also helps destitute owners through its 12 free clinics, which enable people on low incomes (homeless, on minimum social benefits, etc.) to have their pets treated, vaccinated, sterilized and identified.

The SPA also takes action against animal abuse through a network of 700 volunteer delegate-investigators and inspectors, and takes legal action against those guilty of mistreating animals. Its Anti-Trafficking Unit (cellular anti-trafic, CAT by its acronym in French) investigates professionals to uncover the various forms of animal trafficking that are sources of mistreatment. CAT raises public awareness of animal welfare and responsible adoption, and fights to advance the animal cause. At the same time, CAT educates youths about respect for animals through its youth clubs and its activities in schools and after-school clubs. It also supports associations and local authorities in their animal protection projects.

== History ==
In September 1843, Pierre Dumont de Monteux, a doctor, was horrified by the sight before him: a cart driver was manhandling an exhausted horse hitched to a cart in a Paris street, watching as the man whipped and beat him to get up and walk. "Where is justice, where is pity, where are all the moral sentiments that should characterize social man?" he raged.

The association was founded on 2 December 1845 by Pierre Dumont de Monteux, Paris Police Prefect Gabriel Delessert, Viscount Valmer and Dr. Étienne Pariset, a physician at the Salpêtrière hospital. Dr. Étienne Pariset is its first president. Following in the footsteps of the Society for the Prevention of Cruelty to Animals, founded in England in 1824, it was initially founded to protect carriage horses from abuse. It was recognized as a public organization by decree on 22 December 1860. The acronym "SPA" symbolizes the association's name and motto: "sauver – protéger – aimer" (save, protect, love).

In 1903, the first SPA shelter opened in Gennevilliers (92).

Since 1905, the association has been fighting animal experiments on dogs. Camille du Gast presides over the association before the World War II.

In 1945, the first SPA free clinic opens in Paris (75).

For the SPA, respect for animals means educating future protectors from an early age. In 1948, it created the first Club Jeunes (Youth club) section, making volunteer work in shelters accessible to young people aged 11 to 17.

In 1976, the association submitted the "animal charter" to the French National Assembly, with the support of Roland Nungesser, who later became one of the association's presidents. In 1982, it began publishing Animaux Magazine, enabling it to campaign on a larger scale. In 1987, a parliamentary study group on animal protection was set up at the French National Assembly, thanks to Roland Nungesser (association's president at the time). In 1992, he set up an anti-trafficking unit to dismantle clandestine breeding operations. In 1993, he worked with his European counterparts, officially setting up a European service to push through legislation at European Commission and Parliament level.

In 1994, the new Penal Code punishes acts of cruelty to animals with 2 years' imprisonment and a €30,000 fine, and mistreatment with a fine ranging from €457 to €762.

In July 2014, the association's members, meeting at the annual general meeting, proclaim their opposition to any euthanasia not justified on medical grounds.

In 2015, the association celebrates its 170th anniversary, opens its first SPA home and changes its visual identity.

In 2016, the large refuge located in Pervenchères (61) dedicated to equines opens its doors and the SPA obtains the "Don en confiance" label.

On 16 July 2018, the Board of Directors elects Jacques-Charles Fombonne as President of the SPA. On 22 June 2019, a new Board of Directors is elected for 3 years, and Jacques-Charles Fombonne is re-elected president.

In 2021, the association still bears the name "Société protectrice des animaux". It registered the "Maison Société Protectrice des Animaux" trademark on 7 May 2014, its new logotype ("semi-figurative trademark") on 23 January 2015, the "La cani-course pour les animaux (Can-course for animals)" trademark on 12 May 2015 and the "Allo animal perdu (Lost animal hotline)" trademark on 12 June 2015.

In 2023, construction of a new shelter in Gennevilliers is halted, following the liquidation of the chosen construction group.

== Governance ==
=== Presidents ===
- 1845–1847 : Étienne Pariset
- 1847–1850 : Marquis de Faudoas
- 1850–1853 : Jacques Delmas de Grammont
- 1853–1865 : Augustin-Denis Pinon-Duclos, viscount of Valmer
- 1866 : Louis-Auguste Bourguin
- 1867 : Félix Édouard Guérin-Méneville
- 1868–1870 : Pierre Baltazar Fournier
- 1870 : Amédée Sibire
- 1870–1871 : Louis Crivelli (by intérim)
- 1871–1878 : Auguste Valette
- 1878–1881 : Hippolyte Larrey
- 1881 : Georges de Salverte
- 1882–1885 : Alphonse Féry d'Esclands
- 1886–1888 : Émile Decroix
- 1889–1893 : Émile Pelvey
- 1893 : Alexandre Cuif (by intérim)
- 1894–1902 : Albert Uhrich
- 1902–1911 : Albert Coutaud
- 1911–1913 : Marquis du Trévou de Breffeillac
- 1914– : André Falize
- 1917–1924 : Dr. Henry Boucher
- 1924–1925 : Emmanuel Berguème
- 1926–1927 : François Friry
- 1927–1929 : Adrien Pouriau
- 1929–1942 : Camille du Gast
- 1942–1949 : Laurent Bailly
- 1949– : Gustave Dumaine
- -1959 : Lombard
- 1959–1964 : Bottier
- 1964–1966 : Quemy
- 1966–1968 : Thuny
- 1968–1971 : Henry Raymond
- 1972–1984 : Jacqueline Thome-Patenôtre
- 1984–1987 : Roland Nungesser
- 1987–2000 : Jacqueline Faucher
- 2000–2006 : Serge Belais
- 2006–2008 : Caroline Lanty
- 2008 : Virginie Pocq Saint-Jean
- 2009 : Caroline Lanty
- 2009–2013 : temporary administration
- 2013–2018 : Natacha Harry
- Since 2018 : Jacques-Charles Fombonne
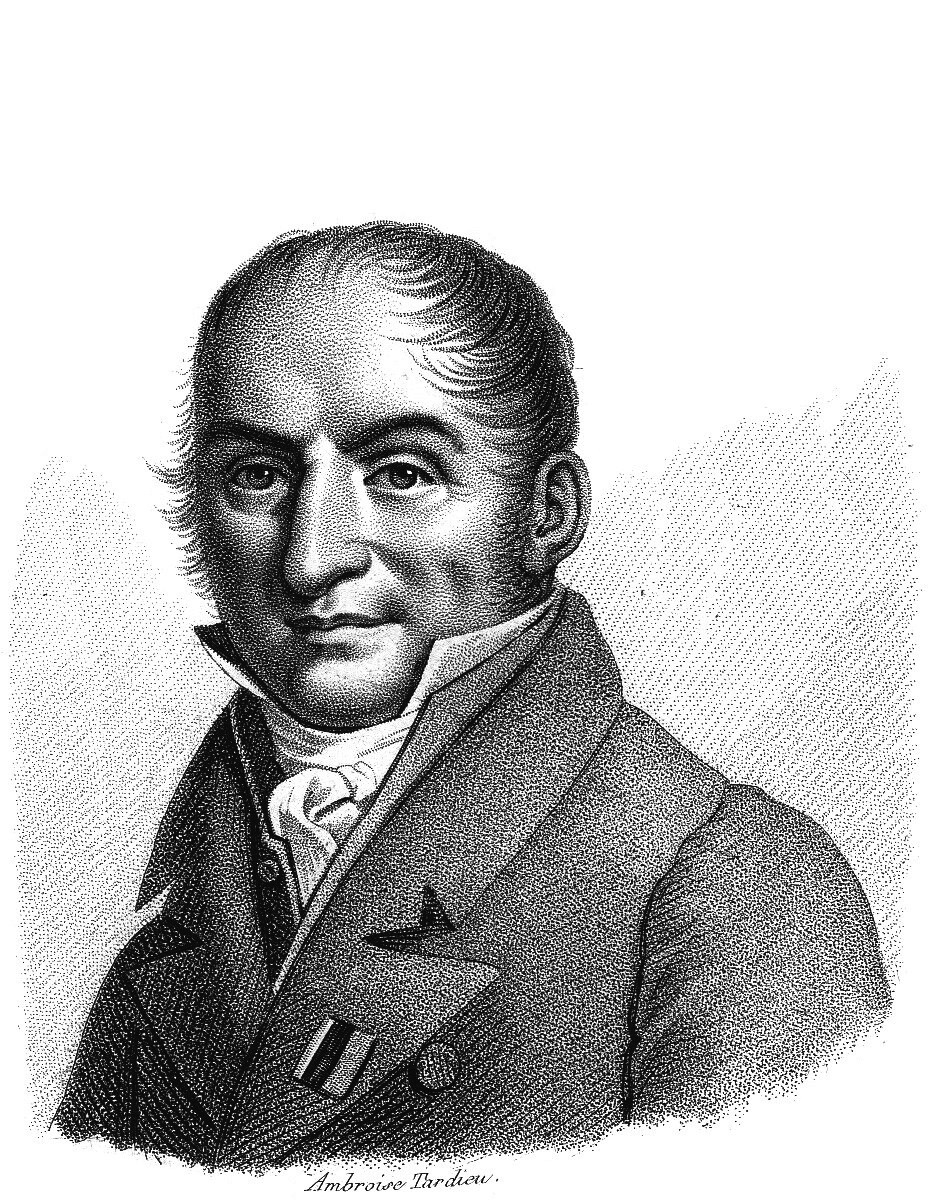
Étienne Pariset (1845-1847)

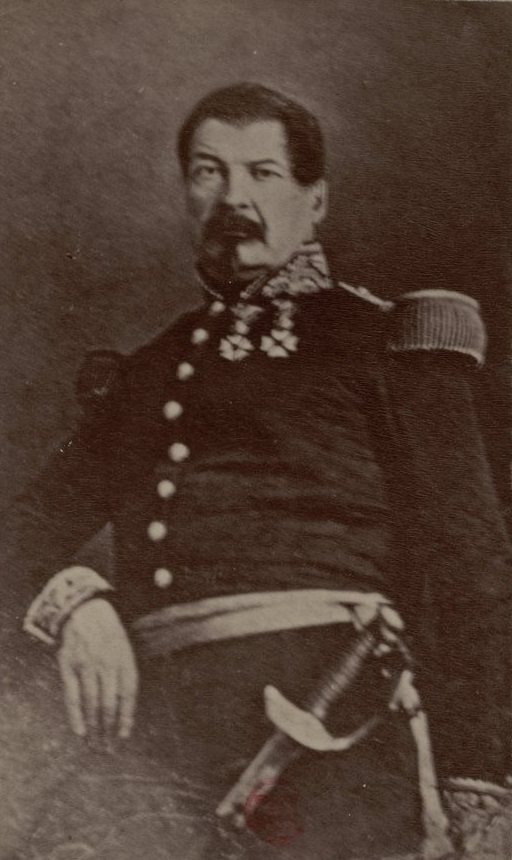
Jacques Delmas de Grammont (1850-1853)

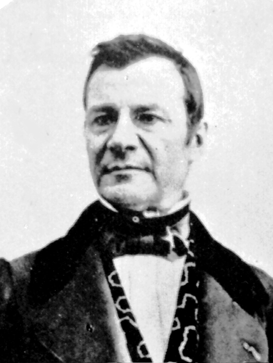
Félix Édouard Guérin-Méneville (1867)

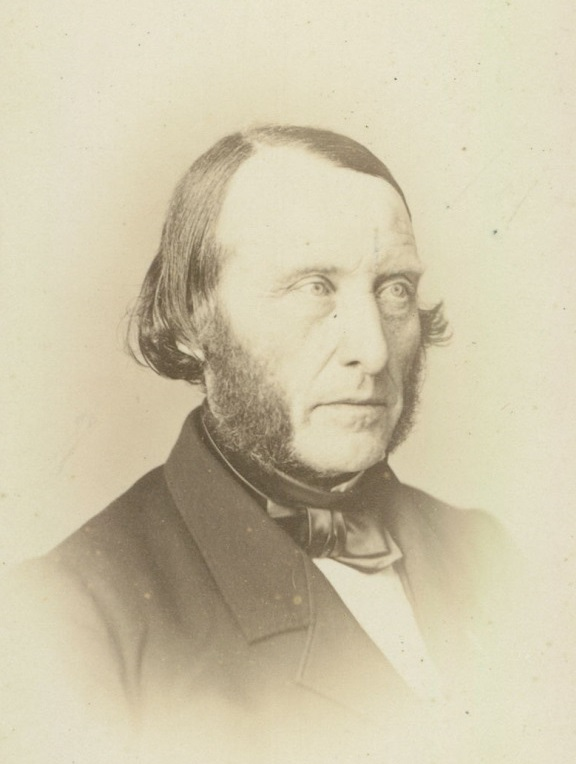
Auguste Valette (1871-1878)

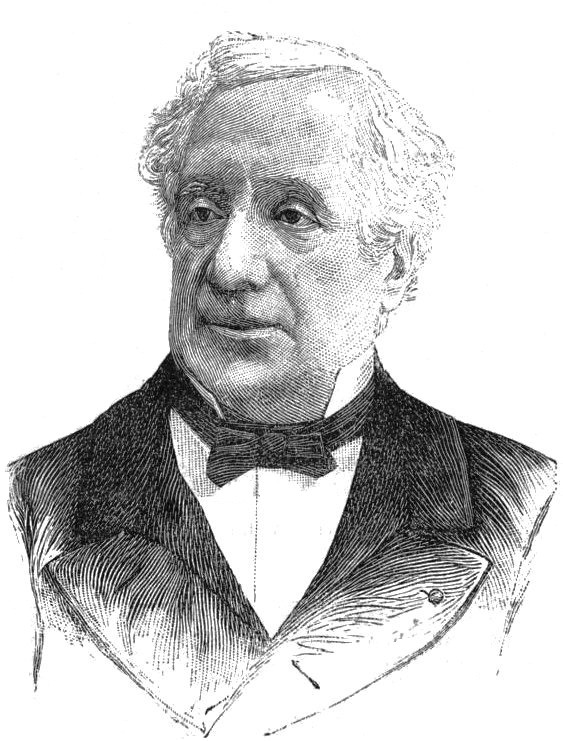
Hippolyte Larrey (1878-1881)

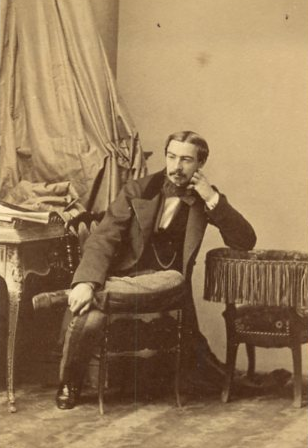
Georges de Salverte (1881)

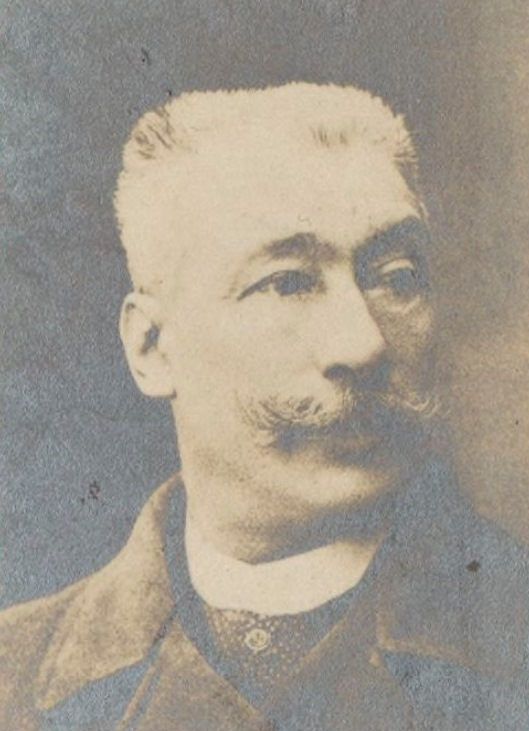
Alphonse Féry d'Esclands (1882-1885)

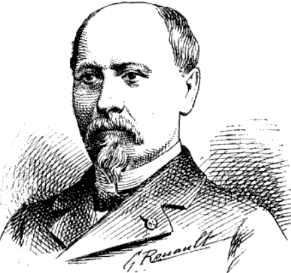
Émile Decroix (1886-1888)

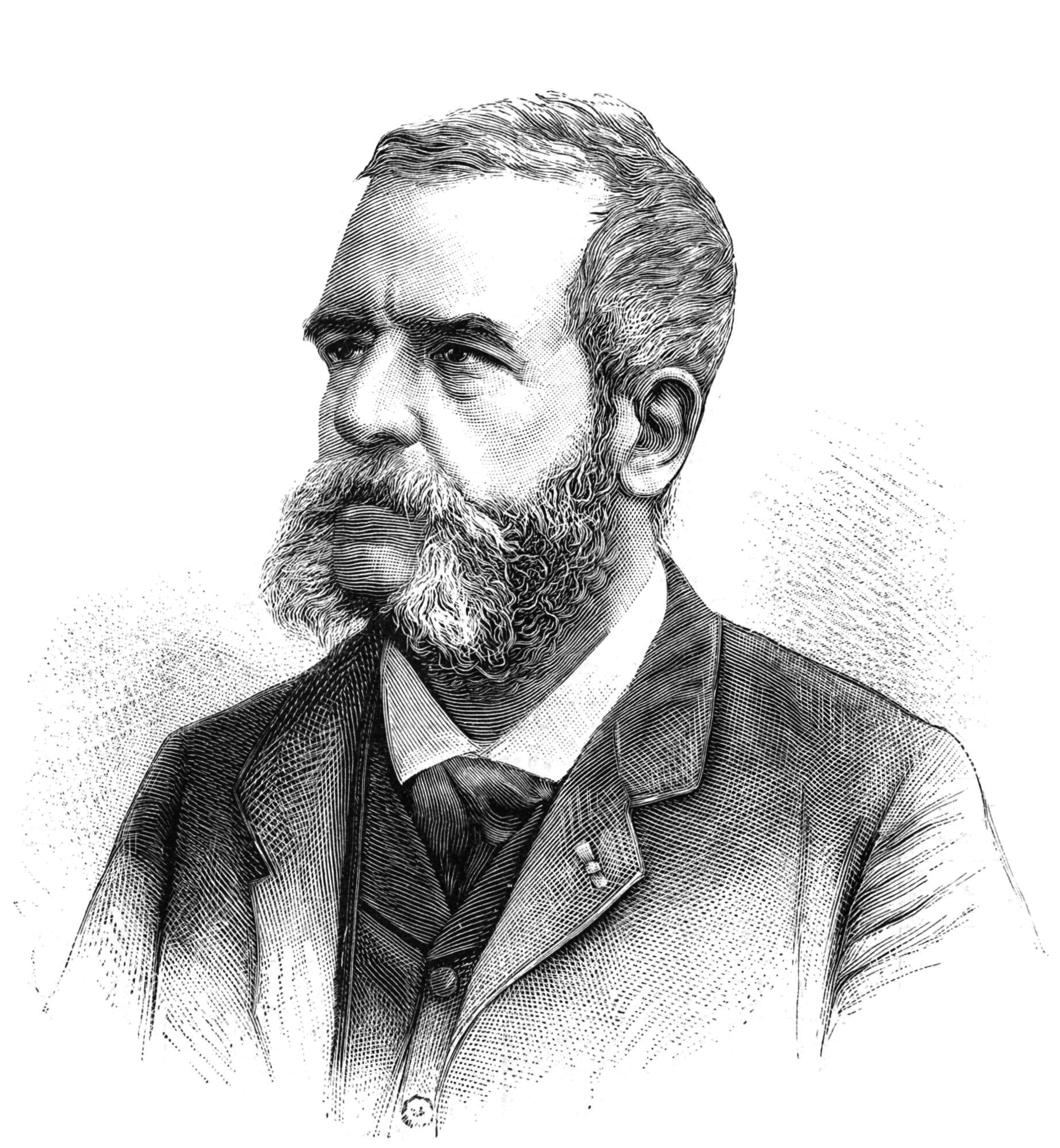
Émile Pelvey (1889-1893)

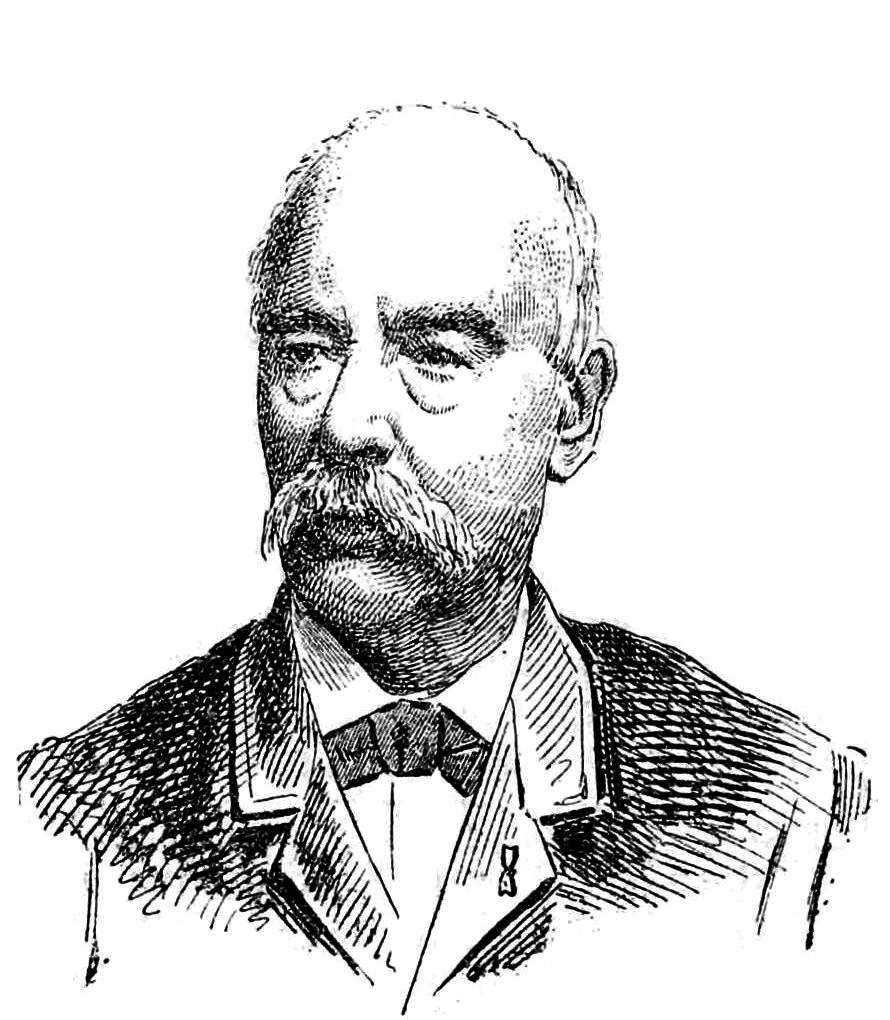
Alexandre Cuif (1893)

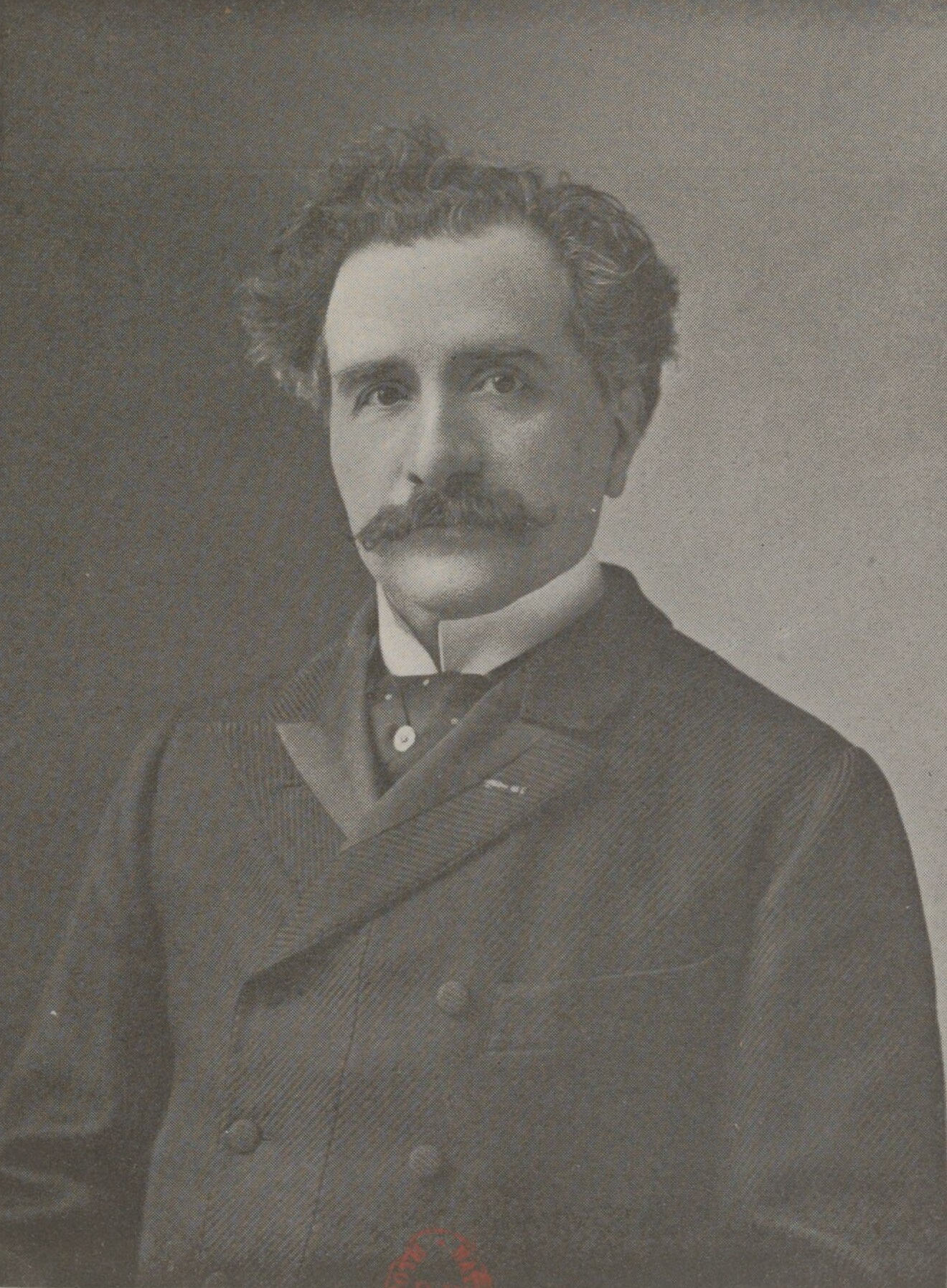
Albert Coutaud (1902-1911)

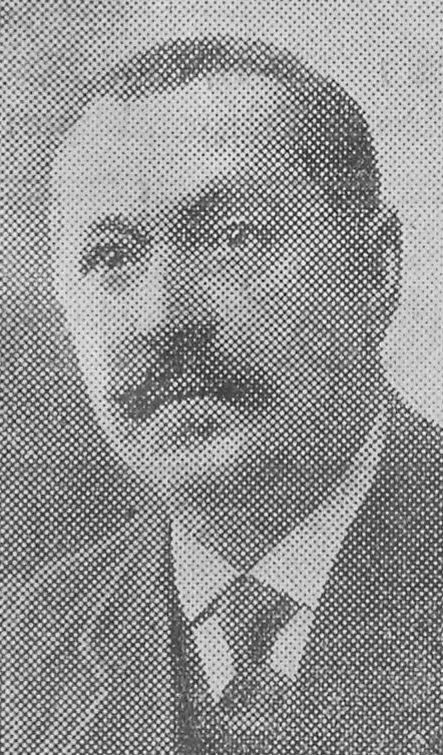
Emmanuel du Trévou de Breffeillac (1911-1913)

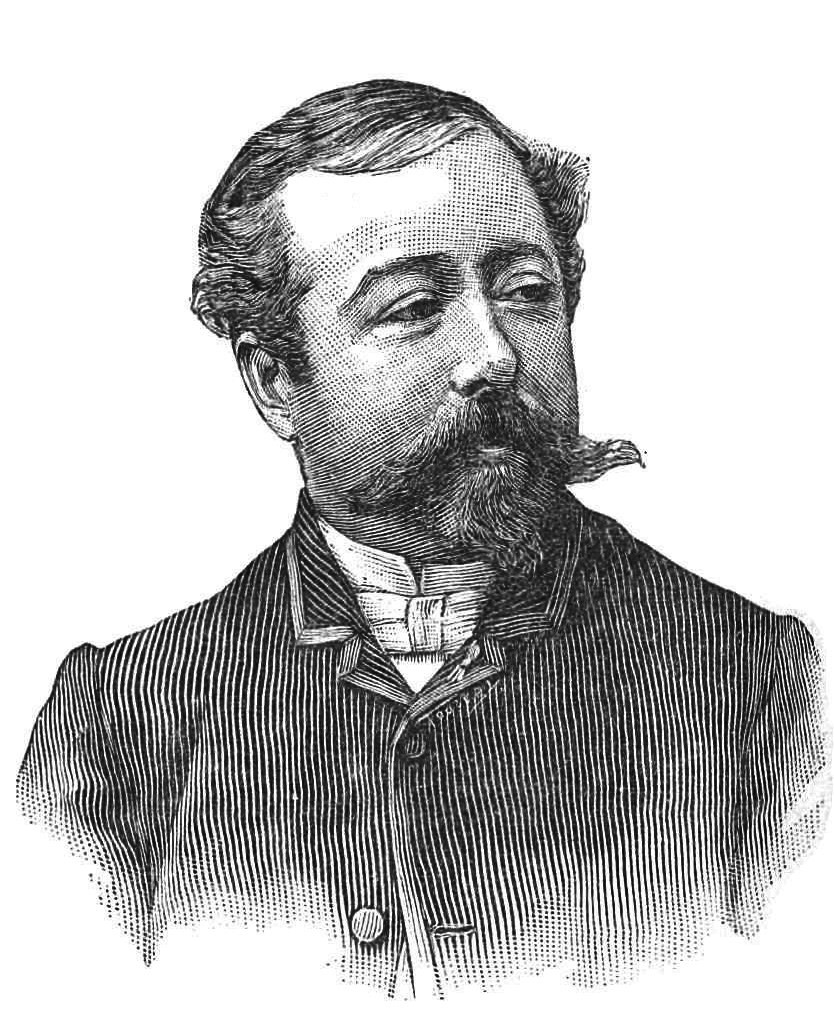
Dr. Henry Boucher(1917-1924)

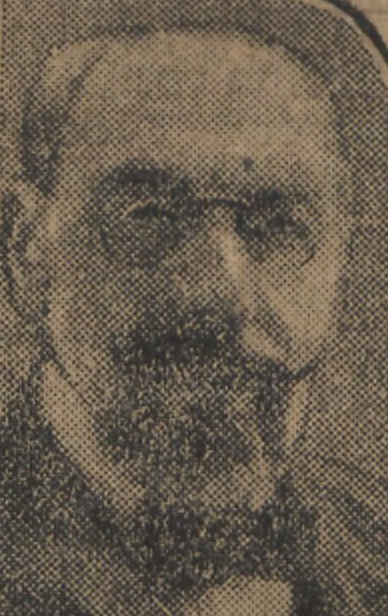
Emmanuel Berguème (1924-1925)

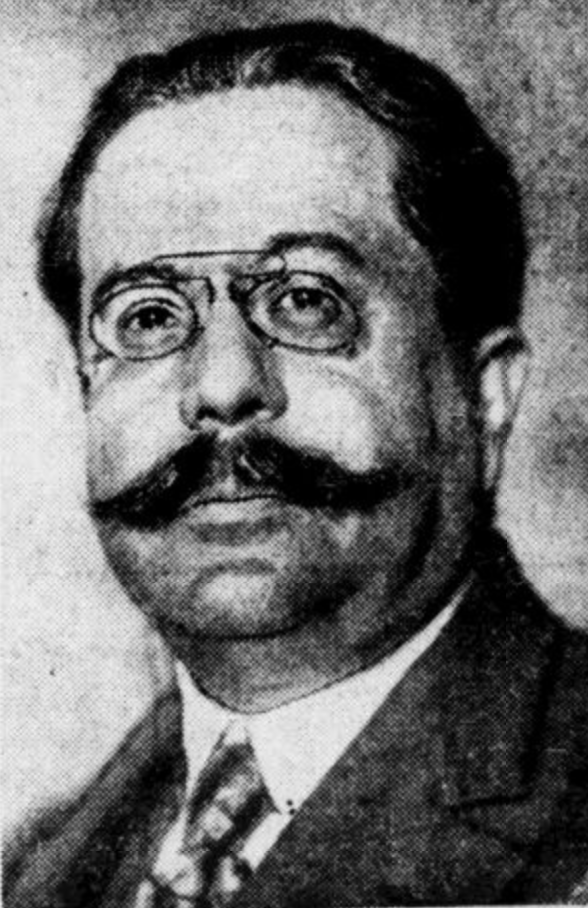
Adrien Pouriau (1927-1929)

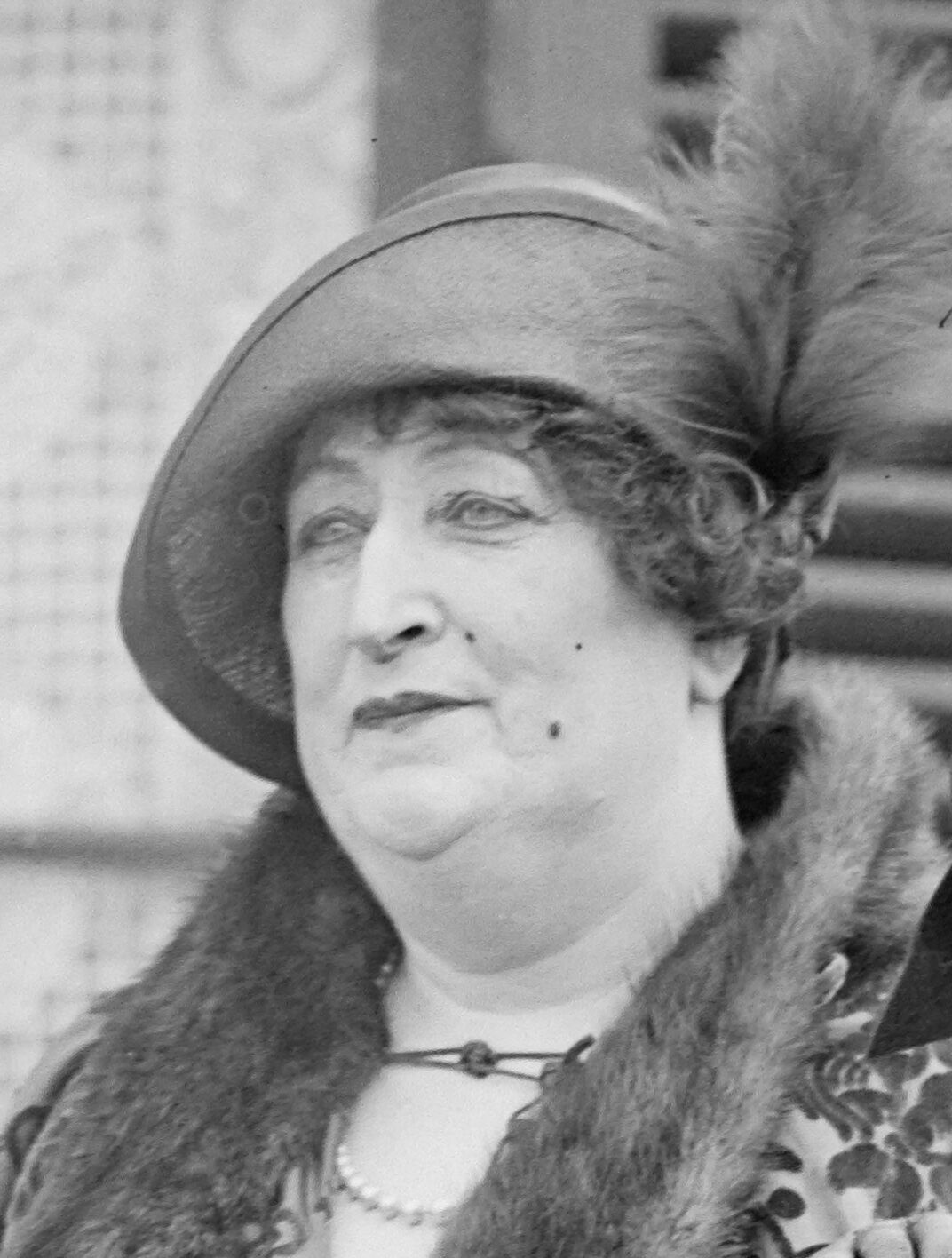
Camille du Gast (1929-1942)

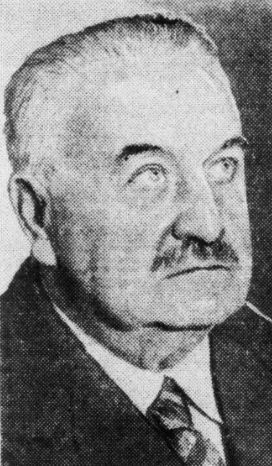
Laurent Bailly (1942-1949)

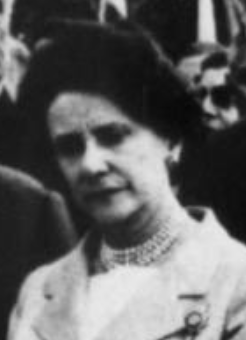
Jacqueline Thome-Patenôtre (1972-1984)

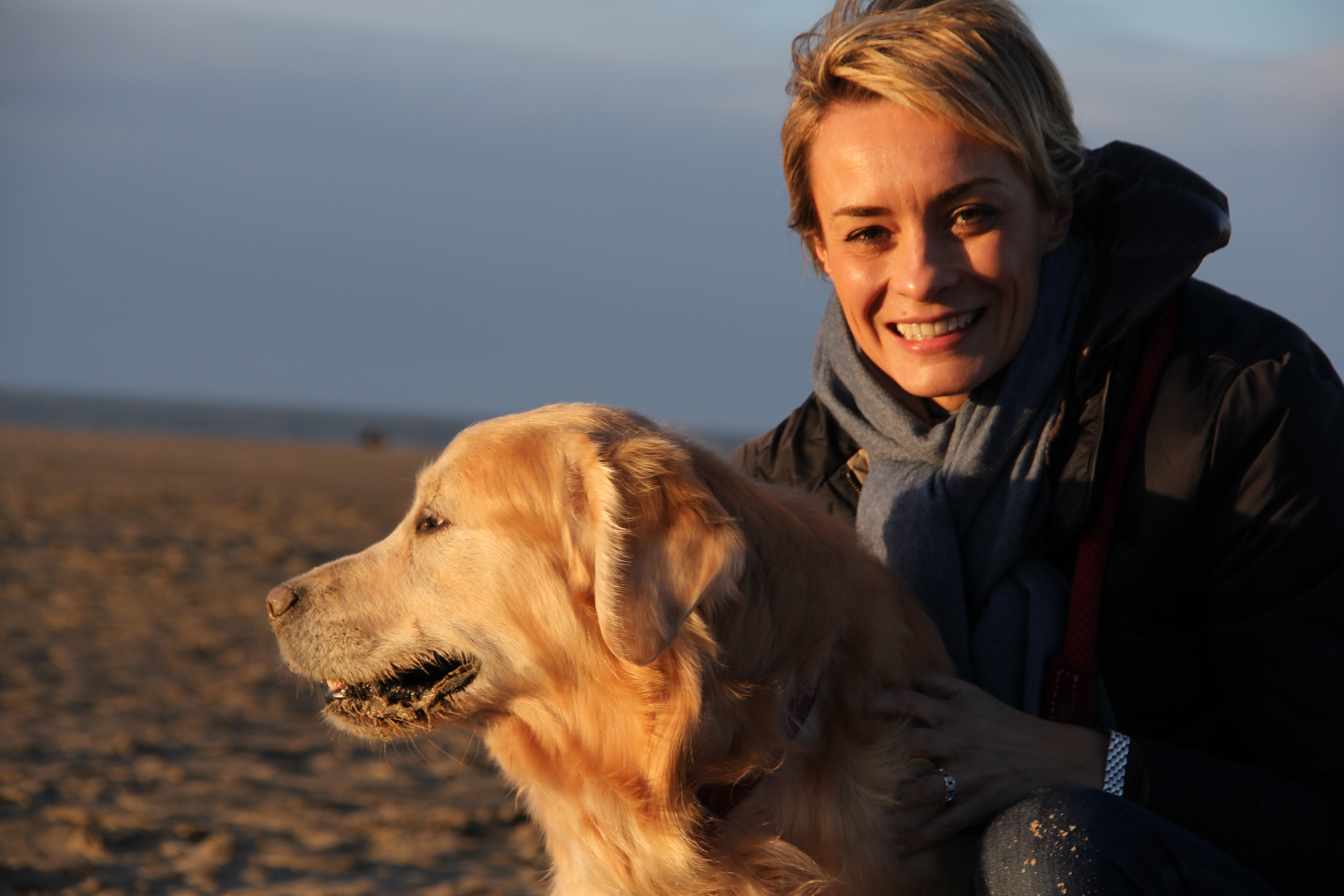
Natacha Harry (2013-2018)

== Resources ==
In 2020, the SPA declared a budget of 72.2 million euros, 84 % of which came from the public (including 84 % from the generosity of 260,000 donors, 26.2 million euros in bequests and 27.5 million euros in donations). In addition to its 710 salaried employees, the association declared the support of 4,096 volunteers and 19,100 members in 2020. The association also manages 55 shelters and 12 free clinics throughout France.

== Activities ==
=== Ethical battles ===
In April 2016, the association launched a large-scale poster campaign in some 15 major French cities to "put an end to cruelty inflicted on animals in France". With the slogan "Torture is legal", the campaign consists of three posters: one with a lamb to denounce animal slaughter conditions, another with a rabbit for experimentation and a final one with a bull to stigmatize bullfighting. The campaign aims to "challenge politicians to finally break the deadlock", and is available on the web with the hashtag #JeVousFaisUneLettre (I write you a letter) and a dedicated site, enabling web users to challenge elected representatives on Twitter. A petition against bullfighting is also online.

On 13 October 2020, the association launches a national campaign to raise awareness of the need to sterilize cats. It fights for this cause on an ongoing basis, as cat sterilization has an impact on the cat population, and on abandonment. Indeed, owners who don't sterilize their cats for financial reasons or because of prejudices, can find themselves overwhelmed by the litters generated. In this sense, sterilization is a one-off investment in the animal's well-being.

==== Bullfighting ====
In November 2017, the association attacked those involved in bullfighting before a criminal judge: on 6 November 2017, it filed a complaint targeting bullfighting. This action for serious abuse and acts of cruelty is brought before the Paris High Court and targets bullfighters, companies organizing bullfighting shows, and the municipalities that authorize them. The offence of serious abuse and cruelty is punishable by 2 years' imprisonment and a €30,000 fine. For the association, the penal text that authorizes "bullfights" in France must be interpreted restrictively and cannot be applied to bullfights, which consist of putting the animal to death after multiple tortures. In this way, the association hopes to encourage the public authorities to amend the legislation to meet society's high expectations in terms of respect for the sentience of animals.

A campaign to mobilize against bullfighting is being launched on 4 April 2019, targeting the general public, as well as members of parliament and senators. This campaign highlights the paradox that exists between bullfighting, which is authorized in certain regions of France, on the one hand, and animal abuse, which is punishable by law, on the other. An online petition was circulated, reaching over 100,000 signatures. A letter was also sent to deputies and senators asking them to take a stand against this cruel practice, and to propose a rewrite of the law to abolish bullfighting in France. In October 2019, the association took the case to the criminal courts once again, and sued those involved in bullfighting, i.e. communes, organizing companies and bullfighters, to put an end to the practice.

On 10 September 2020, the association attended the hearing at the Bayonne correctional court following the summons by way of direct summons to the courts of the commune of Bayonne, the president of the bullfighting organizing company, as well as an internationally renowned bullfighter.

==== Animals in circuses ====
The association campaigns for a ban on wild animals in circuses and has made it one of its priority battles. In March 2018, it launched a mobilization campaign hoping that France would put an end to this commercial exploitation of wild animals that generates mistreatment, and that communes would no longer accept circuses with wild animals.

In July 2019, alongside other animal protection associations, SPA expressly asked the government to put an end to the exploitation of wild animals in circuses.

==== Pet shops ====
In October 2020, SPA embarked on an ethical battle against the instrumentalization of animals. It is calling for a ban on the sale of animals in pet shops and strict supervision of online ads, to put an end to the market in animal suffering. On the legal front, the association is proposing a change in the law, while at the same time launching a strong awareness campaign and a petition addressed to the government. This business with living creatures encourages compulsive buying, which does not impose the conditions essential to the interests of animals and buyers, and which runs the risk of ending in abandonment. Every year, 46,000 dogs and cats are taken in by the association. The Animal Protection Department and the Anti-Trafficking Unit are confronted every day with the other side of the coin when investigating cases of mistreatment. Every year, over 14,000 investigations are carried out by the association.

The association has submitted to the government a modification of the law by ordinance :

- to prohibit the opening of any new, refurbished or transferred commercial establishment selling dogs and cats in 2021 or 2022;
- to prohibit the sale of animals without owning the breeding females from which they originate;
- and therefore to restrict online advertising to approved breeders and professionals.

== Legal controversies ==
In 2002 and 2009, two reports by the Cour des Comptes (Court of Accounts) highlighted the association's "approximate management" and called into question its charitable status and tax benefits. In November 2009, a provisional court-appointed administrator was appointed to carry out a complete assessment of the association's accounts, and to organize a reform of the articles of association. The new bylaws were approved by the membership on 5 December 2011, and a year later by the Minister of the Interior.

In June 2013, new members were elected to the Board of Directors, putting an end to the period of provisional judicial administration; at the end of the new Board's first meeting, its nine members elected journalist and veterinarian Natacha Harry as their new president.

In December 2013, Le Canard enchaîné published an article questioning the management of the association's receivership. The article focused on the fees and conflicts of interest of the administrator, Michèle Lebosséde.

In early 2016, the "Association des Vrais Amis de la SPA" (Association of True Friends of the SPA VASPA by its acronym in French) took the case to court, seeking to shed light on the conditions under which 20 million euros allegedly evaporated between 2004 and 2008. At the heart of this affair: the resale by mysterious non-trading property companies of real estate bequeathed to the association.

On 6 June 2016, the press, and in particular the daily Le Parisien, reported several complaints lodged in March for "usurpation of title, fraud and breach of trust, active and passive corruption, and illegal taking of interests", prompting the opening of a preliminary investigation.

On 15 March 2017, the Cour des Comptes issues its third report on the association, "with two reservations: the inadequacy of internal control, which has made no progress since the previous audit, with the exception of improved management of legacies; the inadequacy and delay in renovating sites, already criticized by the Court in 2002, while hoarded financial reserves have accumulated, with equity reaching 68 M€ at the end of 2015".

In 2018, the association is setting up a dedicated internal audit department to ensure compliance and oversight of its practices. The construction of a comprehensive system for the prevention and detection of breaches of probity, is one of the flagship measures deployed. Various tools have been put in place to detect and prevent the risk of breaches of probity: code of conduct, ethics charters, internal alert system, Risk and Quality Management Committee, risk mapping, employee training on probity and awareness of the Sapin 2 law, declaration of links of interest, assessment of third parties, implementation of 1st and 2nd level controls in procedures, etc. The construction of a single document repository, formalized and shared with all employees, is another essential prerequisite for the implementation of effective internal control at the association's head office and sites.

In addition, the association has held the "Don en confiance" label since 2016 (renewal obtained in 2019 for a three-year period). This label guarantees transparency and rigor in the use and allocation of funds collected. As part of this, the association undertakes to comply with the Don en confiance code of ethics and submits to ongoing monitoring.

== See also ==
- French Equestrian Federation
- Horse welfare reforms

== Bibliography ==
- Fleury, Georges (1995). La Belle Histoire de la S.P.A. : de 1845 à nos jours (in French). Grasset. ISBN 2-246-49631-4.
- La Société protectrice des animaux, rapport officiel (in French). Cour des comptes. 2002. ISBN 978-2-11075-446-2.
