= Jules Patenôtre des Noyers =

French diplomat (1845–1925)

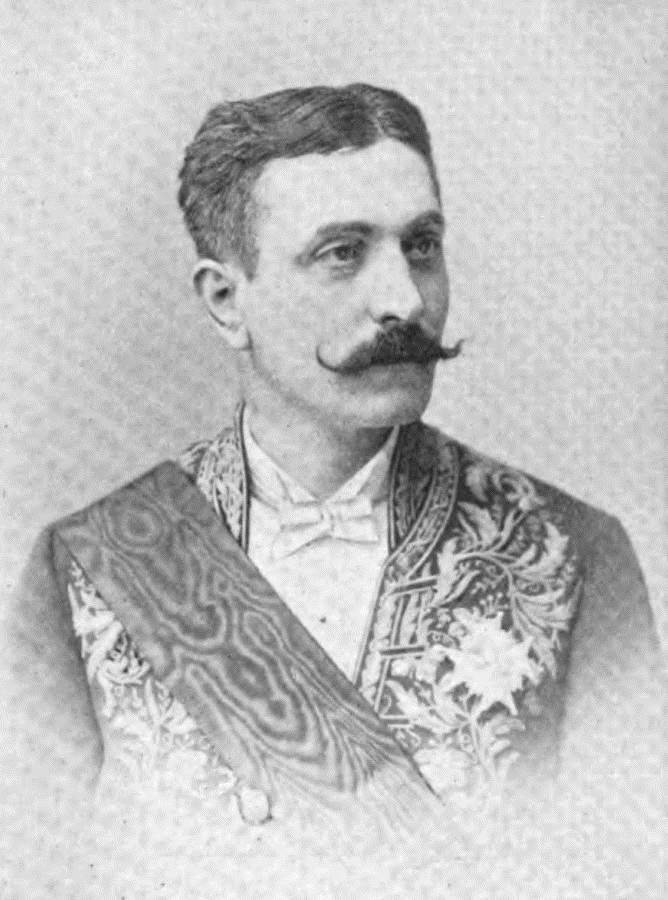

French Ambassador to Spain
- In office 1897–1902
- Preceded by: The Marquis of Reverseaux
- Succeeded by: Jules Cambon

French Ambassador to the United States
- In office 1891–1897
- Preceded by: Théodore Roustan
- Succeeded by: Jules Cambon

French Minister to the Sultanate of Morocco
- In office 1888–1890

French Minister to China
- In office 1884–1886
- Preceded by: Arthur Tricou
- Succeeded by: Jean Antoine Ernest Constans

French Minister to Sweden
- In office 1880–1883
- Preceded by: Robert de Tamisier
- Succeeded by: Charles Le Peletier d'Aunay

Personal details
- Born: 20 April 1845 Baye, Marne, France
- Died: 26 December 1925 (aged 80) Menton, Provence-Alpes-Côte d'Azur, France
- Spouse: Eleanor Elverson (m. 1894; died 1925)
- Children: Raymond Patenôtre; Yvonne Patenôtre
- Relatives: Jacqueline Thome-Patenôtre (daughter-in-law)
- Education: École Normale Supérieure
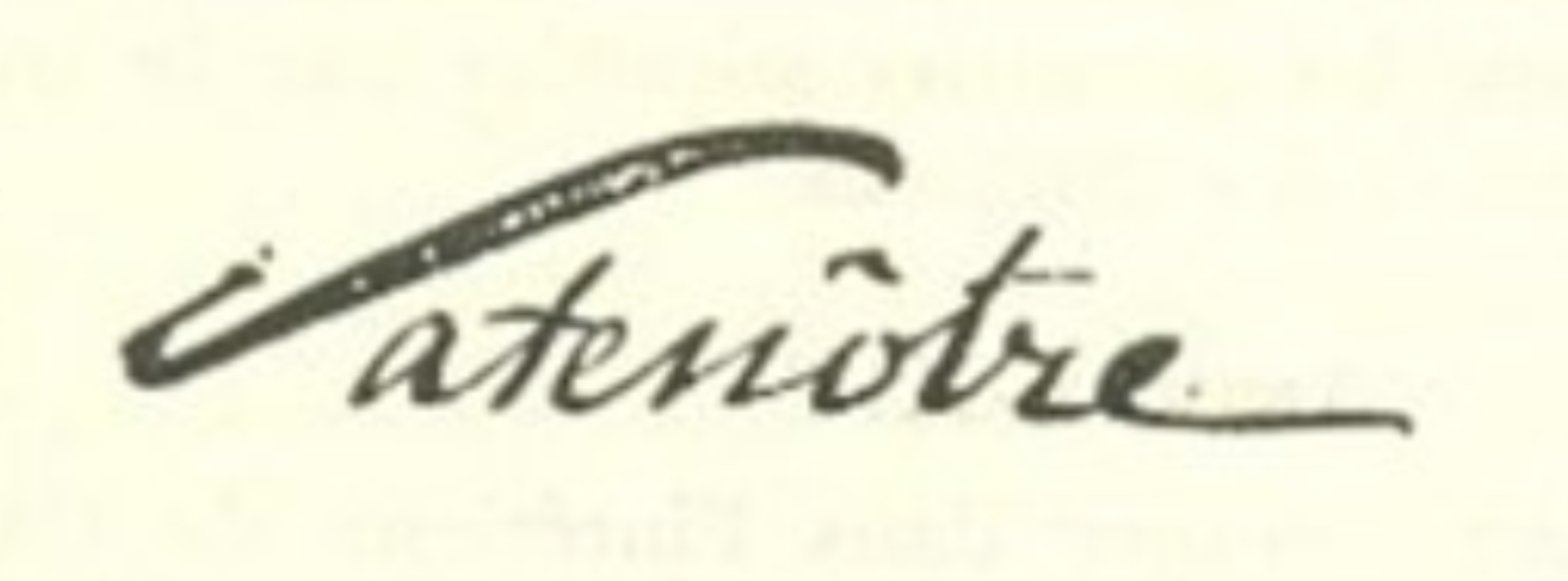
- Signature

Jules Patenôtre des Noyers (20 April 1845 – 26 December 1925) was a French diplomat.

== Early life ==
Patenôtre was born in Baye (Marne) on 20 April 1845. He was the son of Charles Patenôtre (1814–1878) and Hortense Philipponnat (1822–1906). His paternal grandparents were Nicolas Pierre Patenôtre and Marie Justine (née Radet) Patenôtre. His maternal grandparents were Philippe Louis Philipponnat and Rosalie (née Bouché) Philipponnat.

Educated at the École Normale Supérieure, he taught for some years in the Algiers lycée before he joined the diplomatic service in 1871.

== Career ==
He took service from 1873 to 1876 in the North of Persia. In 1880, he was appointed minister plenipotentiary in Stockholm, Sweden, succeeding Robert de Tamisier. He served until 1883 when he was replaced by Charles Le Peletier d'Aunay.

=== China ===
In September 1883 he was named French minister to China and could conduct his most important mission in 1884, when he was sent as to regularize the French dominion in the Vietnamese protectorate state of Annam. The Harmand Treaty of 25 August 1883 had not been ratified by the French parliament and had upset the Chinese government. Patenôtre left Marseille at the end of April 1884 with a modified version of the treaty drafted by the Quai d'Orsay for signature by the king of Annam. At the end of May, he moved to a military vessel near Cap Saint-Jacques, learnt about the end of the Sino-French war and the Tientsin Accord of 11 May and received additional instructions from Paris. He arrived in Hải Phòng on 26 May and in Huế on 30 May, and started discussions with Nguyễn Văn Tường, the Regent. On 6 June 1884, the imperial Chinese seal - a symbol of the vassal status of Annam which had been given to Gia Long - was melted and the Patenôtre Treaty was signed.

He then proceeded to Shanghai where he arrived on 1 July to settle with China the difficulties which had arisen over the evacuation of the Chinese troops from Tongking. The negotiation failed, and the French admiral Sébastien Lespès resumed hostilities against China in August 1884. The next year Patenôtre signed with Li Hongzhang a treaty of peace at Tientsin, by which the French protectorate in Annam and Tongking was recognized, and both parties agreed to remain within their own borders in the future.

=== Morocco ===
From 1888 to 1891, Patenôtre served as Minister Plenipotentiary to the Sultanate of Morocco. In 1912, the Sultanate became a French protectorate when Sultan Abd al-Hafid signed the Treaty of Fez, following the French military occupation with the invasion of Oujda and the bombardment of Casablanca in 1907.

=== United States ===
In December 1891, Patenôtre was presented his credentials in Washington, D.C. as the French Minister to the United States, succeeding Théodore Roustan. Roustan had been appointed the French Ambassador in Madrid, a post Patenôtre himself was appointed several years later. Two years after being in Washington, he was raised to the rank of ambassador. He served as Ambassador until December 1897 when he was transferred to Spain, and presented his letters of recall to President William McKinley. He was succeeded by Jules Cambon, a former governor-general of Algeria.

=== Spain ===
Like his predecessor Roustan in the United States, he was appointed ambassador to Spain at Madrid in 1897. Roustan had retired from the post in Madrid in 1894 and was succeeded by Frederic Guéau, Marquis of Reverseaux, who was replaced by Patenôtre. Patenôtre was received by the Queen Regent in Madrid on 29 December. While he was Ambassador, the Spanish–American War broke out in 1898, which was resolved by the Treaty of Paris of 1898. He "seconded the efforts of the French Government for the re-establishment of peace at the time of the" War. He was rumoured to have been transferred to Constantinople in 1898, but they were unfounded. He retired in 1902 and was, again, succeeded as Ambassador by Jules Cambon in his post.

He was appointed a Grand Officer of the Order of Legion d'Honneur in 1902.

== Personal life ==
On 27 March 1894, Patenôtre was married to Eleanor Louise "Nellie" Elverson (1870–1953) at 2024 Walnut Street in Philadelphia, Pennsylvania, the home of her father. The witnesses were Sir Julian Pauncefote, British Ambassador, and Prince Cantacuzino, Russian Ambassador. The sister of James Elverson, Jr., and daughter of publisher James Elverson, Sr. by wife Sallie Duvall (the three of them owners of The Philadelphia Inquirer). Together, they had two daughters and a son:

- Louise Juliette Patenôtre (1895–1903), who died young.
- Yvonne Constance Patenôtre (1896–1981), who married Boniface, Marquis de Castellane, son of Boni de Castellane and Anna Gould, in 1921.
- Raymond Patenôtre (1900–1951), who married Jacqueline Thome, a daughter of André Thome, a politician who was killed during the Battle of Verdun in 1916.

Patenôtre died on 26 December 1925 at Menton, a commune in the Provence-Alpes-Côte d'Azur region on the French Riviera, close to the Italian border.

=== Gallery ===
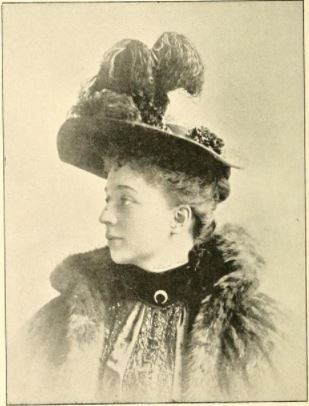
Photograph of his wife, American heiress, Eleanor Elverson, 1895.

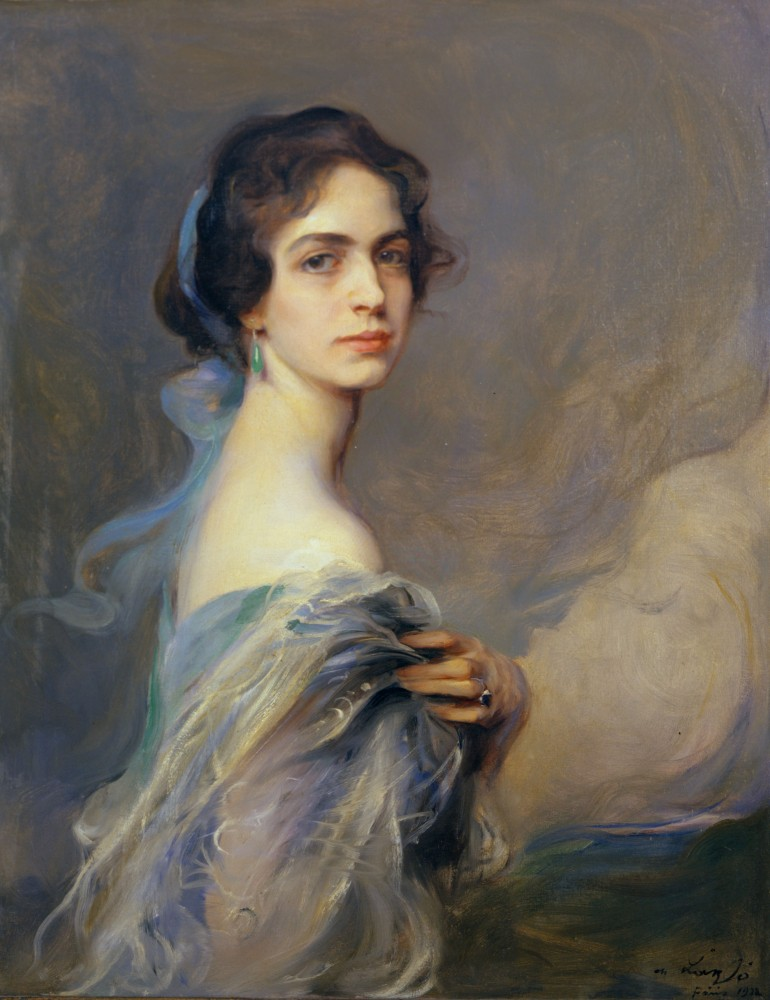
Portrait of his daughter, Yvonne Patenôtre, by Philip de László, 1922

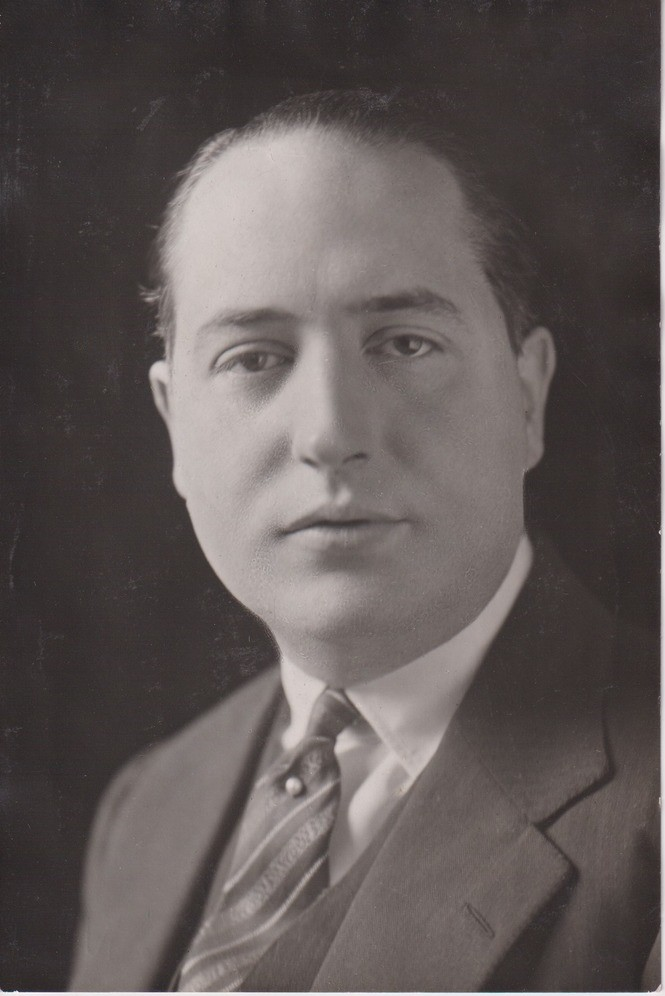
Photograph of his son, Raymond, by Henri Manuel, 1932

Diplomatic posts
Preceded by Robert de Tamisier	French Minister to Sweden; 1880–1883	Succeeded by Charles Le Peletier d'Aunay
Preceded by Arthur Tricou	French Minister to China; 1884–1886	Succeeded by Jean Antoine Ernest Constans
Preceded by	French Minister to Morocco; 1888–1890	Succeeded by
Preceded by Théodore Roustan	French Minister to the United States; 1891–1893	Succeeded by himself (as Ambassador)
Preceded by himself (as Minister)	French Ambassador to the United States; 1893–1897	Succeeded by Jules Cambon
Preceded by The Marquis of Reverseaux	French Ambassador to Spain; 1897–1902	Succeeded by Jules Cambon
