= Timsit =

Timsit is a surname. Notable people with the surname include:

- Joëlle Timsit (born 1938), French diplomat
- Patrick Timsit (born 1959), French comedian, writer and film director

== See also ==
- Vincent Timsit Workshop, building in Morocco
