= France–Sweden relations =

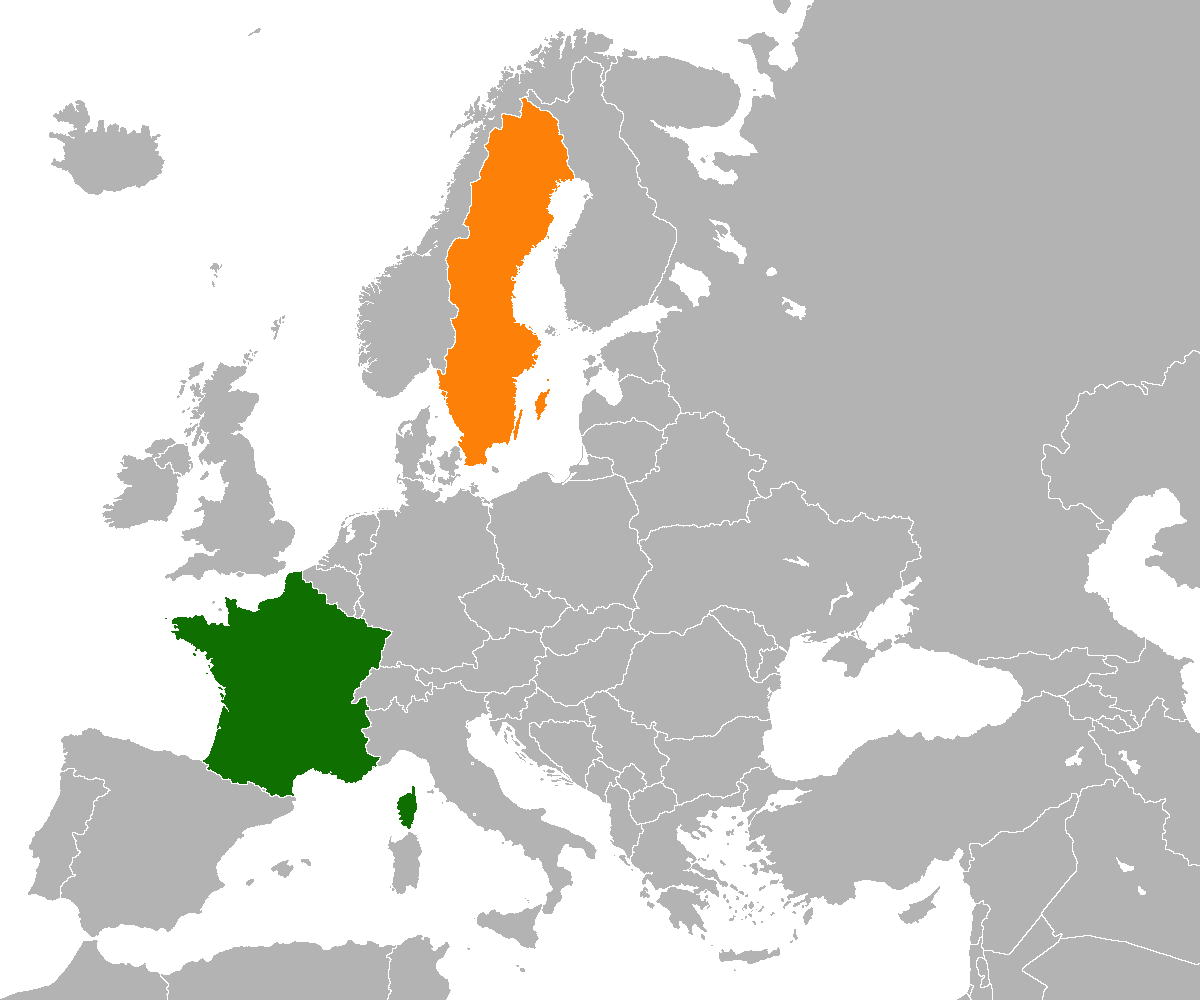
- France: Sweden

Diplomatic mission
- Embassy of France, Stockholm: Embassy of Sweden, Paris

France–Sweden relations are the current and historical relations between France and Sweden. Both nations are members of the Council of Europe, European Union, NATO and the OECD. In August 2022, France fully ratified Sweden's NATO membership application. France strongly supported Sweden's NATO membership during the latter's accession process.

== History ==
=== Early history ===
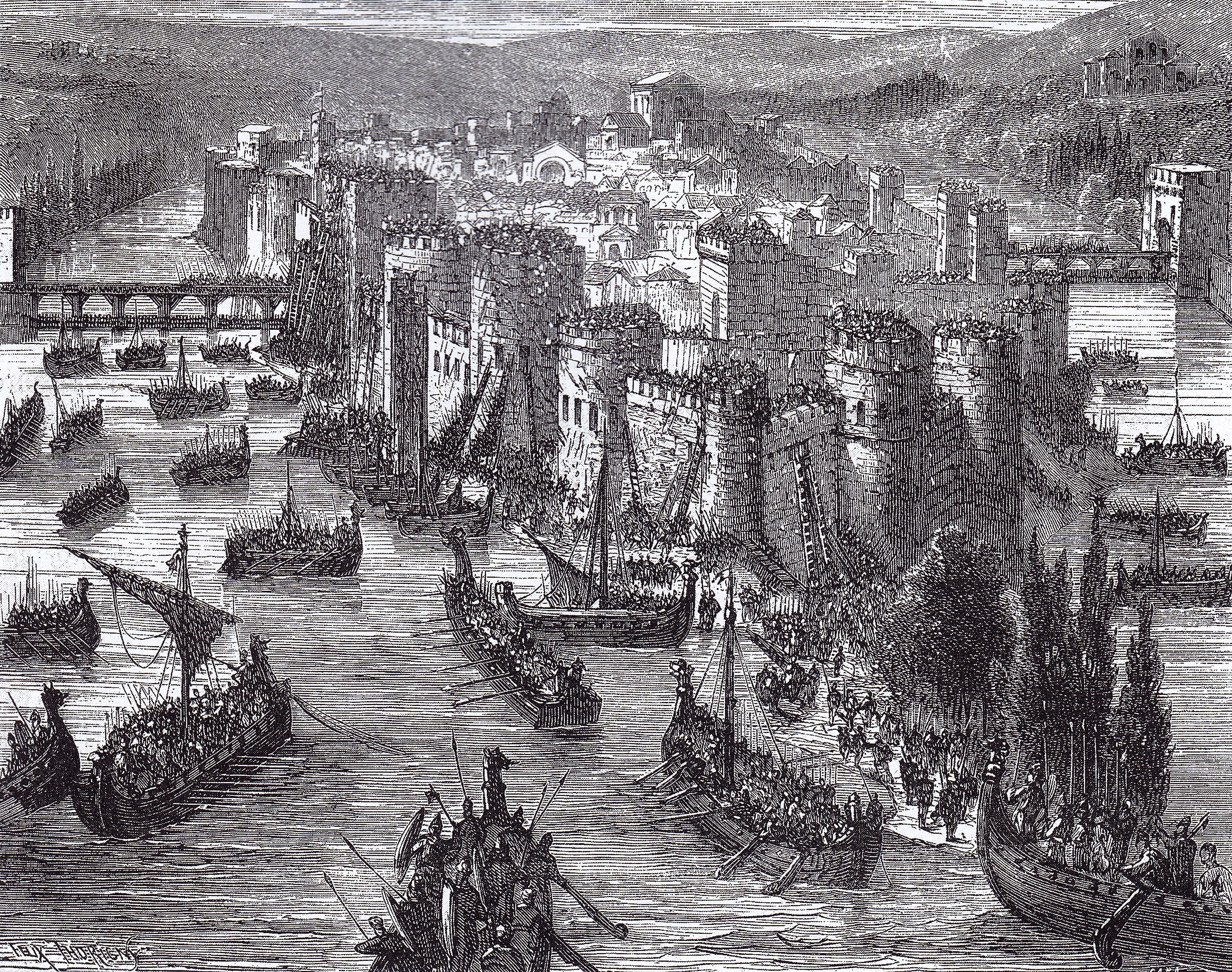
Viking siege of Paris

One of the first contacts between France and Sweden was in 799 during the first Viking raids of the Frankish northern coast. In March 845 Viking Danish-Swedish King Ragnar brought 120 ships up the Seine river for the Siege of Paris. The Vikings left Paris after a month of battle when Frankish King Charles the Bald paid them 7,000 lbs of silver and gold. In 911 after multiple Viking invasions, Frankish King Charles the Simple conceded the town of Saint-Clair-sur-Epte to the Vikings.

In 1499, France and Sweden signed a Trade Treaty for which Sweden sent France hides, skins, furs, butter, fish oil, herrings, whales, tar, timber for the navy, iron and copper. In exchange, the French sent salt Brouage, wheat, wine, canvas, sheets, silks and spices. Across the 16th century, French mercenaries such as Claude Collart and Pontus de La Gardie entered Swedish service. In 1570, France, along with Poland and the Holy Roman Empire, helped conclude the peace between Sweden and Denmark at Szczecin ending the Northern Seven Years' War in 1570. In 1631, during the Thirty Years' War, France and Sweden signed the Treaty of Bärwalde which obliged Sweden to maintain an army of 36,000 troops, and France to fund the Swedish army annually with 400,000 Reichsthalers.

In the 1700s, French culture and the French language became a big influence on the Swedish monarchy. Swedish king Gustave III received a French education as a child. Several prominent Swedish nobles studied in France. Influenced by the French Academy of Sciences, Sweden created the Royal Swedish Academy of Sciences.

=== Jean-Baptiste Bernadotte and Napoleonic Wars ===
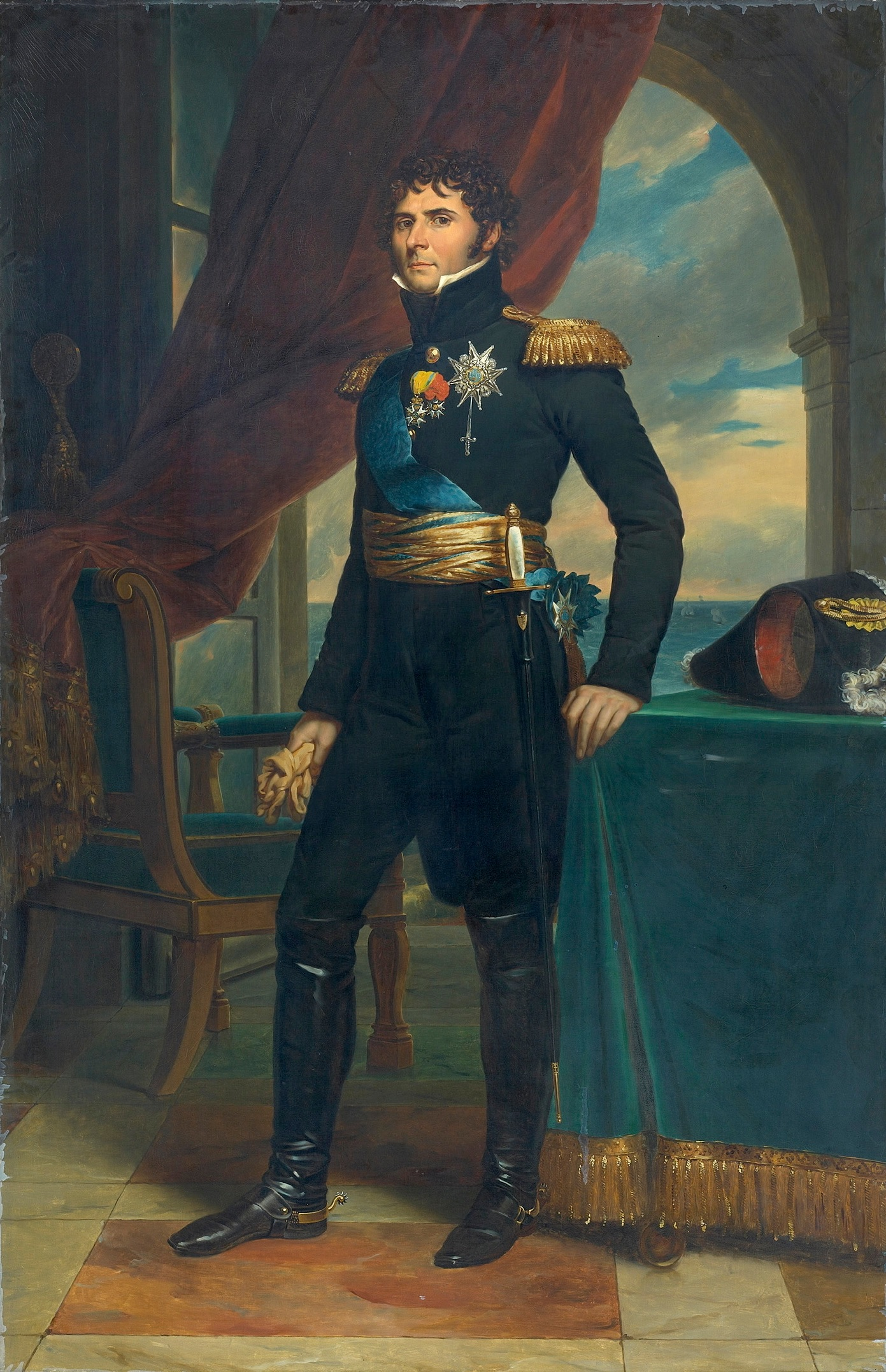
Jean-Baptiste Bernadotte (Charles XIV John) as Crown Prince of Sweden

In 1805, Sweden entered into the War of the Third Coalition and fought against France in the Franco-Swedish War in an effort to defeat France under Napoleon Bonaparte. The war lasted until January 1810, when Sweden was defeated by France's then-ally, Russia. After the war, France and Sweden signed the Treaty of Paris (1810). The next year, French Marshal Jean-Baptiste Jules Bernadotte, who served under Emperor Napoleon, was elected as the heir-presumptive to King Charles XIII of Sweden, who was childless. Bernadotte was elected partly because a large part of the Swedish Army, in view of future complications with Russia, supported electing a soldier and partly because he was popular with the Swedish army because of the kindness he had shown to the Swedish prisoners in Lübeck. Bernadotte accepted the offer.

In 1813, Bernadotte successfully led Swedish troops against Napoleon during the War of the Sixth Coalition which resulted in Napoleon being exiled to the Island of Elba in 1814. In 1818 Bernadotte was crowned King of Sweden and King of Norway after defeating Norway in the war of 1814 after demanded Denmark to cede Norway to Sweden after the Napoleonic Wars as compensation for the loss of Finland in the Finnish War to which the allies agreed, mainly to prevent further conflict. The Danish king ceded Norway shortly after the demands out of fear of Sweden declaring war on Denmark. After the defeat of Norway in 1814 the creation of the union between Sweden and Norway came through. The union lasted for almost a century until it was peacefully dissolved in 1905. After this he became Charles XIV John of Sweden, and simultaneously founded the House of Bernadotte from which the current Swedish royal family hails from. Sweden declared itself officially neutral in 1818 from future conflicts.

=== World Wars ===
During World War I and World War II, Sweden remained officially neutral during both conflicts, however, unofficially sympathized more with the allies and provided military training to allied soldiers. During World War II, French born Swedish diplomat Raoul Nordling secretly met with German General Dietrich von Choltitz to try to limit the bloodshed and damage to the city of Paris during the Liberation of Paris.

=== Post World Wars ===
Since the end of the world wars, both France and Sweden have joined the European Union. Both nations have had numerous high-level visits and cooperate jointly in several multilateral organizations. There are approximately 15,000 Swedish nationals living in France and 3,500 French nationals living in Sweden.

== Military cooperation ==
Military cooperation between France and Sweden is modest as the Swedish focus on exchanges with their Nordic neighbors. Cooperation is primarily operational and has, during the Libyan crisis, enabled Swedish Gripen fighters to take part in NATO air operations. The Swedish armed forces have cooperated with French forces in Africa on several occasions, particularly during the Operation Artemis, UNIFIL Maritime Task Force, and EUFOR Chad.

The 2020s has seen increased military cooperation between the two countries. A joint declaration was issued in 2021 regarding defence cooperation in international operations and material provision. In 2023, Sweden agreed to acquire and further develop the French Akeron MP anti-tank guided missile. Further agreements on defence collaboration were signed in 2024 and 2025.

== Trade ==
In 2015, trade between France and Sweden totaled €10 billion Euros. In 2014, Sweden was France's 16th-largest customer and 18th-largest supplier. At the same time, France was Sweden's 8th-largest customer and 9th-largest supplier.

French foreign direct investment (FDI) in Sweden totalled €3.3 billion in 2013, primarily in the agrifood, equipment and electrical goods sectors. Swedish FDI in France totalled €5.2 billion in 2013, particularly in the automobile industry. Swedish companies such as IKEA and Volvo operate in France.

== Resident diplomatic missions ==
- France has an embassy in Stockholm.
- Sweden has an embassy in Paris.
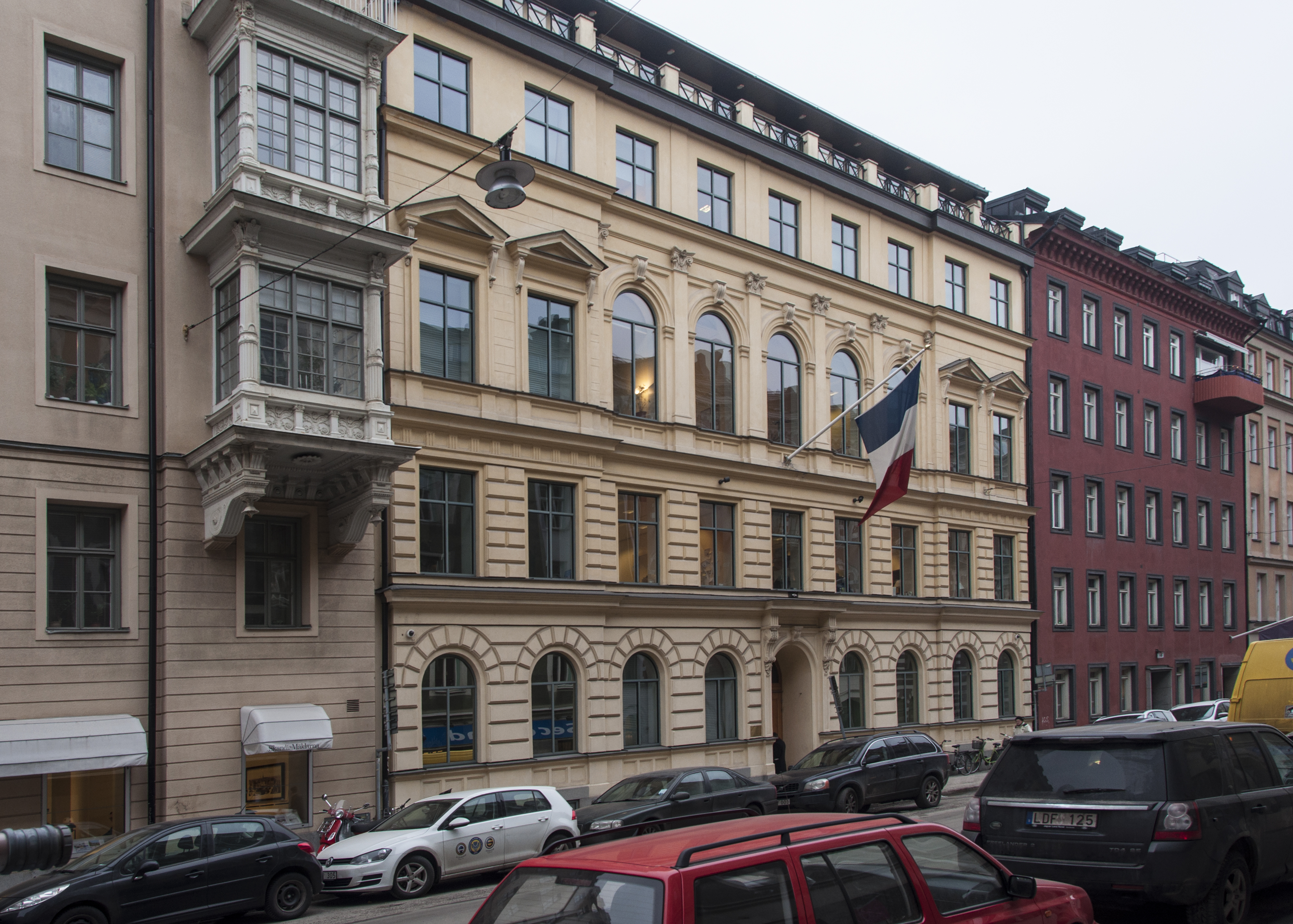
Embassy of France in Stockholm

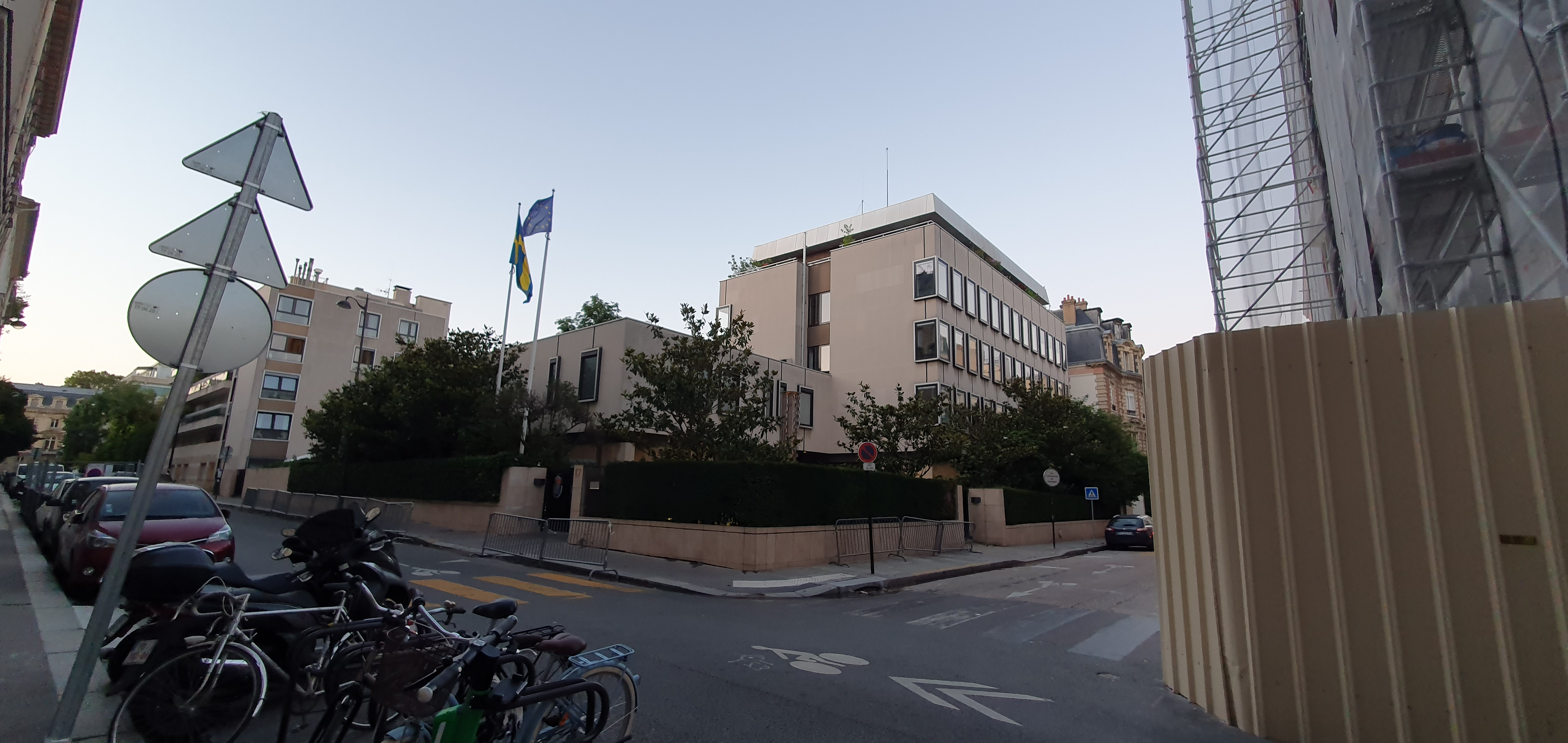
Embassy of Sweden in Paris

== See also ==
- Embassy of France, Stockholm
- Embassy of Sweden, Paris
- Institut Tessin
- List of ambassadors of France to Sweden
