= André Puget =

André Puget may refer to:

- André Puget (footballer) (1882–1915), French footballer
- André Puget (diplomat) (1911–1973), French diplomat
