= List of ambassadors of France to Sweden =

This is the List of ambassadors from France to Sweden.

== Ambassadors of France to Sweden (1541–1936) ==
| From | Until | Ambassadors |
|---|---|---|
| 1541 | 1543 | Christophe Richer |
| 1624 | 1629 | Louis Deshayes |
| 1630 | 1631 | Hercule de Charnacé |
| 1632 | 1632 | Antoine Coëffier de Ruzé d'Effiat |
| 1632 | 1634 | Urbain de Maillé |
| 1634 | 1635 | Claude de Mesmes, comte d’Avaux |
| 1645 | 1646 | Claude des Salles, baron de Rorté |
| 1646 | 1649 | Pierre Chanut |
| 1654 | 1657 | Charles d'Avaugour du Bois |
| 1658 | 1665 | Hugues de Terlon |
| 1665 | 1668 | Simon Arnauld de Pomponne |
| 1670 | 1671 | Pierre Bidal, baron d’Asfeld |
| 1671 | 1672 | Simon Arnauld de Pomponne |
| 1672 | 1672 | Honoré Courtin |
| 1672 | 1682 | Isaac de Pas de Feuquières |
| 1682 | 1684 | François Bazin, marquis de Bandeville |
| 1684 | 1689 | De La Picquetière |
| 1690 | 1692 | Jacques-Vincent Bidal d'Asfeld |
| 1692 | 1692 | François-Gaston de Béthune-Sully |
| 1692 | 1699 | Jean-Antoine d'Avaux |
| 1699 | 1701 | comte Louis de Guiscard |
| 1701 | 1707 | Jean-Louis d'Usson |
| 1707 | 1709 | Jean Victor de Besenval de Brünstatt |
| 1709 | 1715 | Jacques de Campredon |
| 1715 | 1716 | Louis-François-Henri Colbert de Croissy |
| 1717 | 1719 | Louis-Pierre-Engilbert de La Marck |
| 1725 | 1727 | Buffile Hyacinthe Toussaint de Brancas |
| 1727 | 1731 | Charles Louis de Biaudos de Casteja |
| 1735 | 1741 | Alphonse Marie Louis de Saint-Sévérin d'Aragon |
| 1741 | 1749 | Marc-Antoine Front de Beaupoil de Saint-Aulaire, marquis de Lanmary |
| 1749 | 1763 | Louis de Cardevac, marquis d'Havrincourt |
| 1763 | 1766 | Louis Auguste Le Tonnelier de Breteuil |
| 1768 | 1771 | François-Charles de Raimond de Modène |
| 1771 | 1774 | Charles Gravier de Vergennes |
| 1774 | 1782 | Pierre Chrysostème d'Usson de Bonnac |
| 1782 | 1789 | Louis Marc Pons, marquis de Pons |
| 1795 | 1795 | Louis-Marc Rivals |
| 1795 | 1796 | Louis-Grégoire Le Hoc |
| 1801 | 1803 | Jean-François de Bourgoing |
| 1810 | 1811 | Charles-Jean-Marie Alquier |
| 1814 | | François-René de Chateaubriand (never took office) |
| 1814 | 1818 | Marie-Hippolyte de Rumigny |
| 1819 | 1820 | Marie-Hippolyte de Rumigny |
| 1821 | 1823 | Hector-Philippe d'Agoult |
| 1823 | 1826 | Ernest de Cadoine de Gabriac |
| 1827 | 1829 | Marc-René de Montalembert |
| 1830 | 1830 | Napoléon Joseph Ney |
| 1831 | 1832 | Napoléon-Hector Soult de Dalmatie |
| 1832 | 1833 | Hubert Jean Victor, Marquis de Saint-Simon |
| 1834 | 1835 | Louis Napoléon Lannes |
| 1835 | 1845 | Charles-Henri-Edgard de Mornay |
| 1848 | 1857 | Charles-Victor Lobstein |
| 1857 | 1860 | Henri Mercier de Lostende |
| 1860 | 1862 | Philippe-Charles-Maurice Baudin |
| 1863 | 1871 | Hugues Marie Henri Fournier |
| 1872 | 1877 | Arthur de Gobineau |
| 1877 | 1880 | Robert de Tamisier |
| 1880 | 1883 | Jules Patenôtre |
| 1883 | 1885 | Charles Le Peletier d'Aunay |
| 1885 | 1888 | Camille Barrère |
| 1888 | 1894 | René Millet |
| 1894 | 1897 | Charles Rouvier |
| 1907 | 1910 | Arsène Henry |
| 1910 | 1918 | Napoléon Eugène Émile Thiébaut |

== Since 1945 ==
| From | Until | Ambassadors |
|---|---|---|
| 1943 | 1945 | de:Christian Carra de Vaux Saint-Cyr |
| 1945 | 1947 | Jean Baelen |
| 1947 | 1948 | Gabriel Puaux |
| 1948 | 1952 | de:Robert de Dampierre |
| 1952 | 1955 | Armand du Blanquet du Chayla |
| 1955 | 1958 | Lucien Bonneau |
| 1958 | 1963 | Émile Dufresne de La Chauvinière |
| 1963 | 1967 | Jacques de Blesson |
| 1967 | 1970 | Air Force General André Puget |
| 1970 | 1972 | Pierre Francfort |
| 1972 | 1975 | Raymond Gastambide |
| 1975 | 1978 | Paul Fouchet |
| 1978 | 1982 | Gérard Gaussen |
| 1982 | 1985 | Pierre Louis Blanc |
| 1985 | 1989 | Robert Mazeyrac |
| 1989 | 1992 | Philippe Louet |
| 1992 | 1996 | Joëlle Timsit |
| 1996 | 1998 | Philippe Petit |
| 1998 | 2003 | Patrick Imhaus |
| 2003 | 2007 | Denis Delbourg |
| 2007 | 2007 | Jean-Pierre Asvazadourian |
| 2007 | 2011 | Joël de Zorzi |
| 2011 | 2014 | Jean-Pierre Lacroix |
| 2014 | 2017 | Jacques Lapouge |
| 2017 | 2020 | David Cvach |
| 2020 | | Etienne Le Harivel de Gonneville |
