= Raymond Patenôtre =

French newspaper publisher and politician

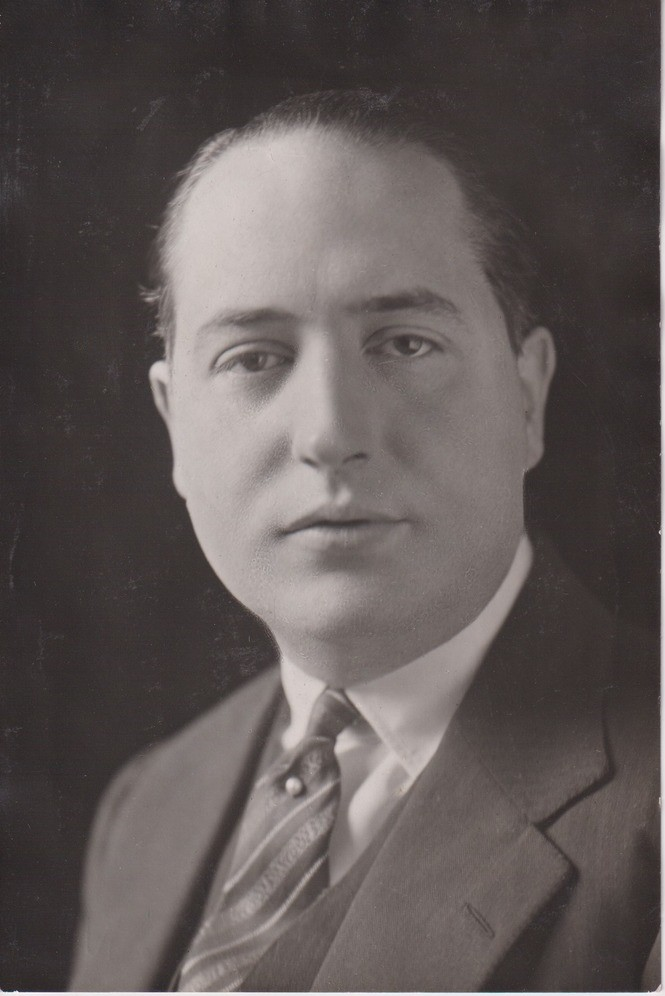
- Portrait of Raymond Patenôtre
- Born: July 31, 1900; Atlantic City, New Jersey, U.S.
- Died: June 19, 1951 (aged 50); Paris, France
- Occupation: Politician
- Spouse: Jacqueline Thome-Patenôtre
- Parent(s): Jules Patenotre des Noyers; Eleanor Elverson
- Relatives: André Thome (father-in-law)

Raymond Patenôtre (July 31, 1900 – June 19, 1951) was the American-born son of the French ambassador to the United States Jules Patenotre des Noyers. He was a newspaper publisher and politician. Patenotre inherited his fortune from his mother: a Philadelphia-born heiress whose father, Col James Elverson, was the owner of the Philadelphia Inquirer which Patenotre later sold on behalf of his mother in a scheme to avoid paying taxes on the proceeds. He acquired La Sarthe, L'Écho républicain de l'Ouest, Le Régional de l'Ouest, Le Petit Var and Petit Niçois.

In August 1933, Patenotre was a co-founder of the French Committee for the Defense of Jewish Rights in Central and Eastern Europe. The committee vowed to fight antisemitic propaganda and to fight against antisemitic legislation. Patenotre's newspapers in Lyon and Nice supported the wartime French Vichy government and embraced the idea of "the New Europe" under German auspices. He served as a member of the Chamber of Deputies from 1928 to 1936, representing Seine-et-Oise.

Through his media empire, Patenôtre promoted the early career of Pierre Laval, who went on to serve as the French Prime Minister from 1942 to 1944 and later executed for treason. Patenotre was arrested on December 13, 1944, by judicial authorities in Lyon pursuing a purge of war time collaborators. Albert Lejeune, editor of the Riviera newspaper Petit Nicois published by Patenotre, was executed for collaboration despite a last minute plea for reprieve on the grounds that he had evidence against Patenotre.

In October 1945, Patenotre won a cantonal election in Rambouillet, a commune southwest of Paris in the Île-de-France. The winner of a French cantonal election sits in the General Council of a department, see: Cantons of France.

In July 1948, Patenotre and his mother were indicted by a Federal Grand Jury for tax evasion stemming from the sale of The Philadelphia Inquirer. Patenotre's mother was accused of having lied about giving her majority share in the newspaper to her son so that it could be sold 'extraterritorially' thus avoiding the tax liability on the grounds that he was a French national. Eleanore Patenotre pleaded guilty in Federal court in September 1949 agreeing to pay a $2,000,000 civil judgment in exchange for a suspended sentence. The case against Raymond Patenotre, who did not attend the hearing on the ground of ill-health, was dismissed. Patenotre died on June 19, 1951, at the age of 51 from a stroke at his residence in Rambouillet.

== See also ==
- Marianne (magazine)
