= Embassy of Sweden, Paris =

- Location: Paris
- Address: Ambassade de Suède; 17 Rue Barbet de Jouy; 75007 Paris
- Coordinates: 48°51′12″N 2°19′4″E
- Relocated: 1974
- Ambassador: Caroline Vicini
- Jurisdiction: France
- Website: Official website

The Embassy of Sweden in Paris is Sweden's diplomatic mission in France.

== History ==
The Swedish legation in Paris was elevated to embassy status on 15 October 1947, and the then Swedish envoy, Karl Ivan Westman, became ambassador.

== Staff and tasks ==
The embassy's mission is to represent Sweden and the Swedish government in France and to promote Swedish interests. Approximately 30 people work at the embassy, divided into five departments focusing on the following areas: Politics, Economy and EU, Press and Information, Administration, Consular Affairs, and Defence. The embassy collaborates with the Swedish Institute, Visit Sweden, Business Sweden, and the Swedish Chamber of Commerce in France.

== Buildings ==
=== Chancery ===
From 1890 to 1900, the chancery was located at 12 Rue de Bassano in the 16th arrondissement of Paris. From 1900 to 1933, the chancery and was located at 58 Avenue Marceau in the 8th arrondissement, a property that was previously owned by the Swedish-French artist Gustaf Adelswärd. In 1934 it moved around the corner to 25 Rue de Bassano, and stayed there until 1941. During World War II and the Vichy regime, between 1942 and 1944, the chancery was located in Vichy, at the Hôtel des Ambassadeurs. From 1946 to 1968, the chancery was again located at 25 Rue de Bassano. From 1969 to 1974, the chancery was located at 66 Rue Boissière in the quarter of Chaillot in the 16th arrondissement. Between 1971 and 1974, the embassy's consular department was located at 125 Avenue des Champs-Élysées.

Since 1974, the chancery and residence is located at 17 rue Barbet de Jouy at Rive Gauche in the 7th arrondissement. The embassy site was bought in 1959 by the Swedish state for 2 million Swedish krona. A Swedish architect was first hired to draw up a proposal for an embassy and ambassadorial residence. When the drawings were not accepted by the French licensing authority, it was instead a Frenchman who came up with the final proposal. The architect André Malizard's proposal has been described as "functional architecture from the 1970s". In 1974, it was possible to move into the new embassy. The facility consists of a chancery, residence and staff housing. The interior is managed by the Ministry for Foreign Affairs' property department itself.

In 2005, the National Property Board of Sweden carried out a major rebuild and modernization of the chancery. The top floor with cell offices was converted into open office space, meeting rooms and staff rooms with kitchenettes. Around the top floor runs a terrace which is now accessible to all staff. The ground floor was adapted for accessibility and the large conference room was modernized with access to the garden. In 2009, the OECD delegation moved into the premises and in 2011 the consular department was moved down to the ground floor. At the beginning of 2015, an energy saving project was carried out at the facility. New ventilation ducts and a new heating system were installed.

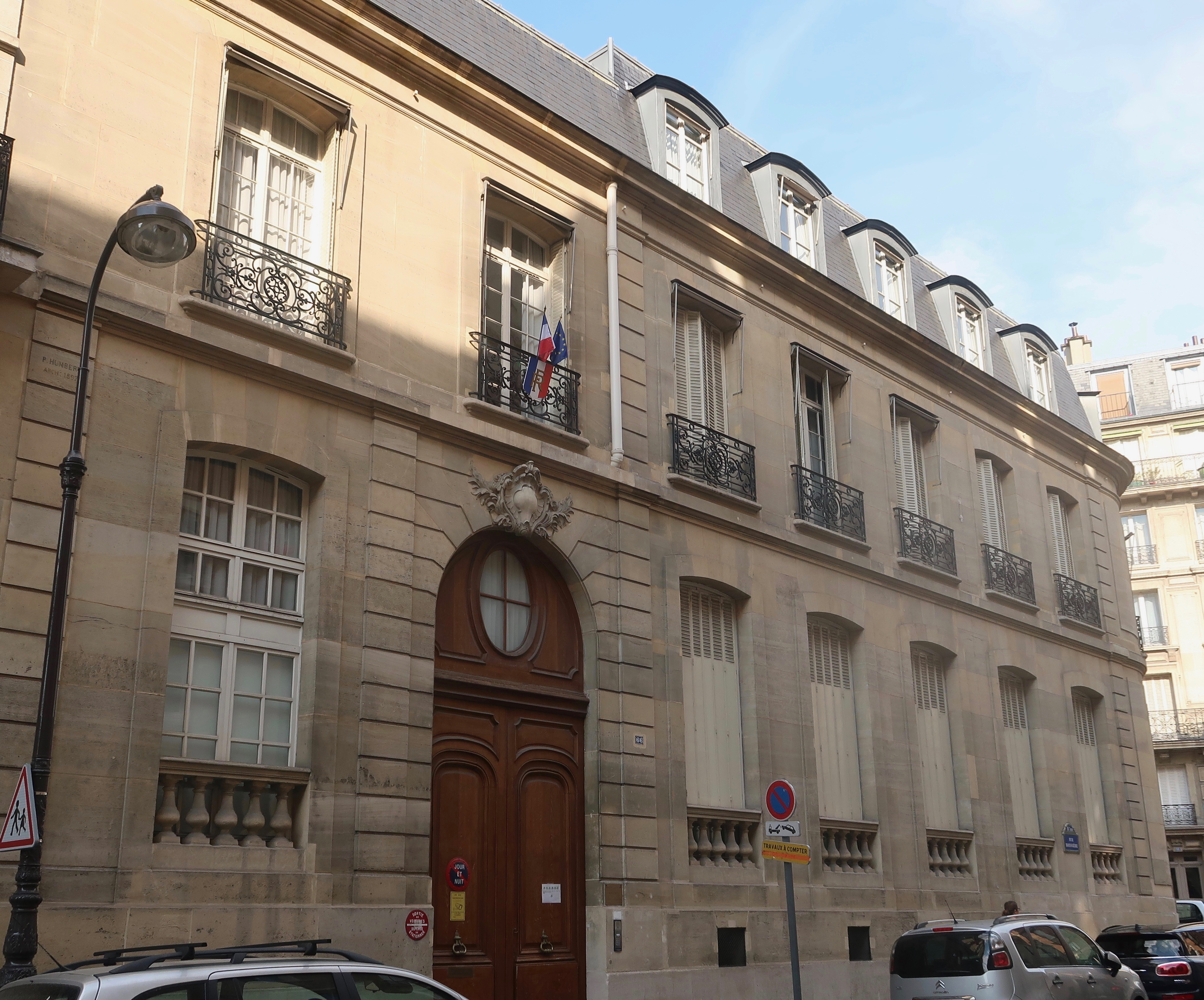
66 Rue Boissière
(1969–1974)

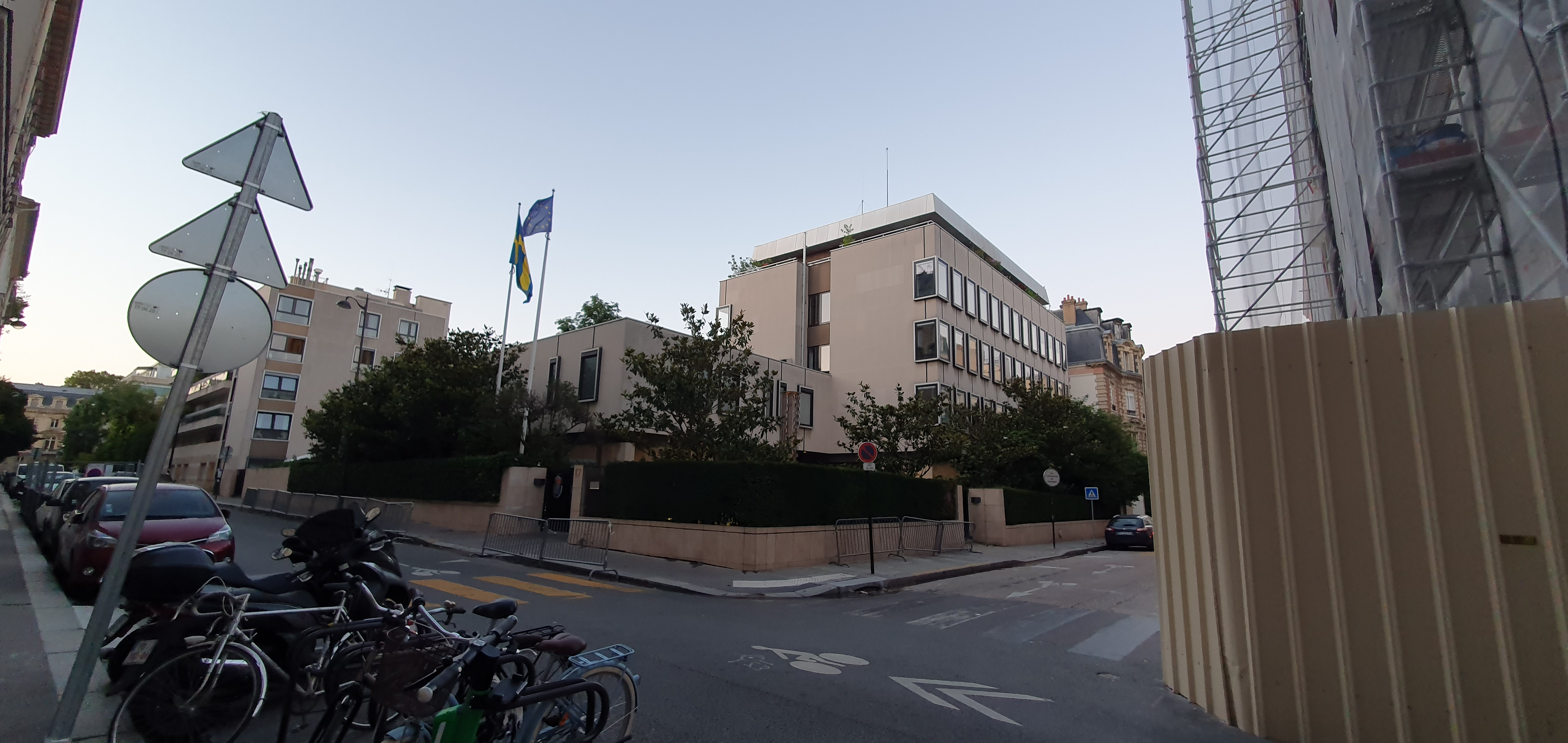
17 Rue Barbet de Jouy
(1974–present)

=== Residence ===
From 1901 to 1941, the residence was located at 58 Avenue Marceau. It was co-located with the chancery until 1934. After World War II, it was located at 48 Avenue Marceau from 1946 to 1947. From 1948 to 1967, it was again located at 58 Avenue Marceau. From 1968, it was located at 11 Avenue d'Iéna in the quarter of Chaillot in the 16th arrondissement. Since 1974, the residence is co-located with the chancery at 17 rue Barbet de Jouy at Rive Gauche in the 7th arrondissement. The residence was renovated in 2015. New ventilation ducts and a new heating system were installed. All windows and window doors in the residence have been given modern energy glass.

== See also ==
- France–Sweden relations
