= André Thome =

French politician

- Born: 24 October 1879; Paris, France
- Died: 10 March 1916 (aged 36); Marre, Meuse, France
- Occupation: Politician
- Children: Jacqueline Thome-Patenôtre; Marguerite Daisy Soldati-Thome, Comtesse de Contades (1907–2001), wife of Agostino Giorgio Soldati
- Relatives: Raymond Patenôtre (son-in-law)

André Thome (24 October 1879 – 10 March 1916) was a French politician. He served as a member of the Chamber of Deputies from 1914 to 1916, representing Seine-et-Oise.

Thome was killed on 10 March 1916 at Marre, near Chattancourt, during the Battle of Verdun. He received the Légion d'honneur posthumously on 23 April 1916.
