= Marre, Meuse =

Marre
- Commune
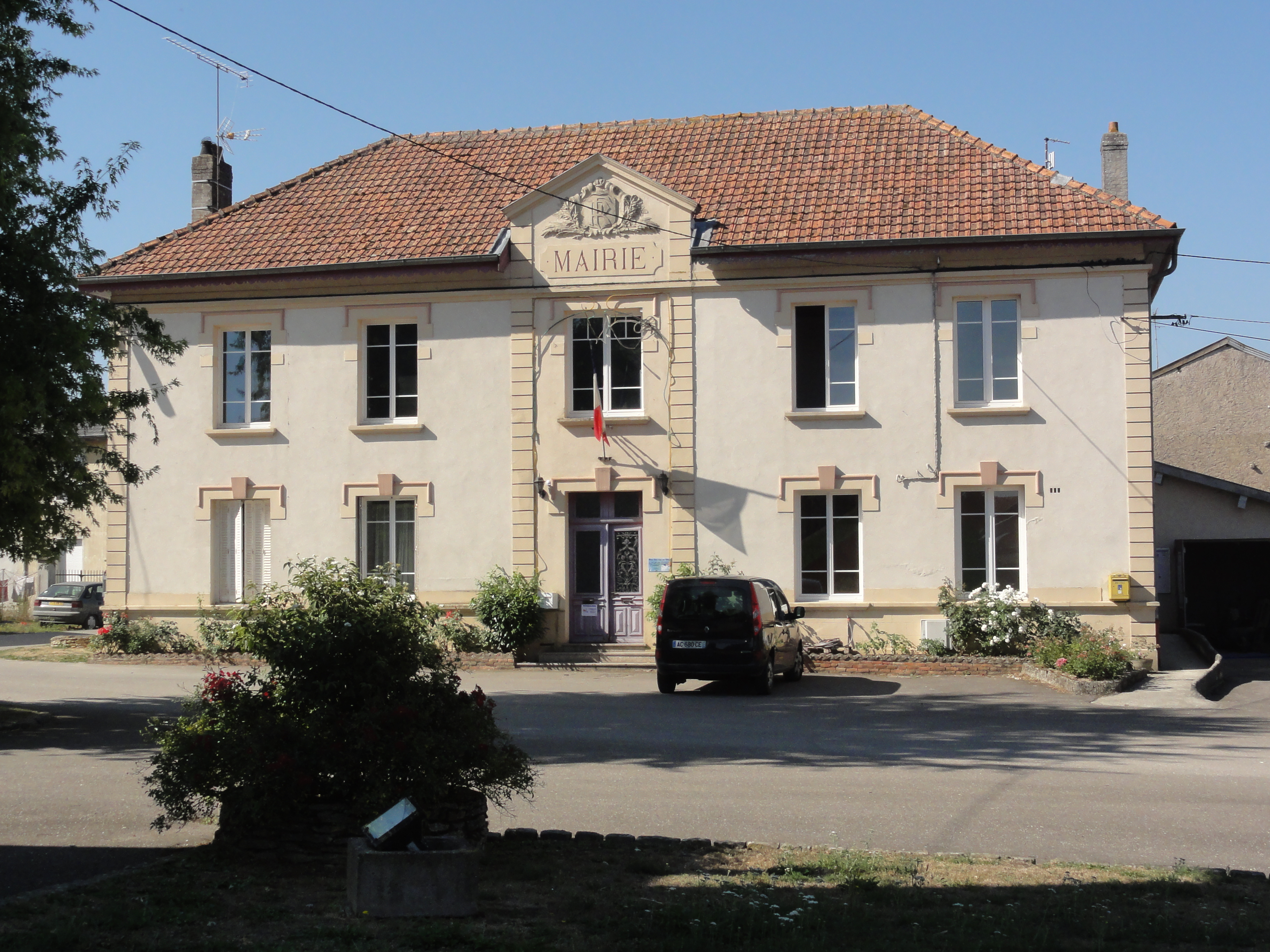
- The town hall in Marre

- Coat of arms
- Location of Marre
- Location within France Location within Grand Est
- Coordinates: 49°12′43″N 5°18′10″E
- Country: France
- Region: Grand Est
- Department: Meuse
- Arrondissement: Verdun
- Canton: Clermont-en-Argonne
- Intercommunality: CA Grand Verdun

Government
  - Mayor (2020–2026): Jean Vernel
- Area^{1}: 10.2 km^{2} (3.9 sq mi)
- Elevation: 190 m (620 ft)
- Highest elevation: 310 m (1,020 ft)
- Lowest elevation: 184 m (604 ft)
- Population (2023): 183
  - Density: 17.9/km^{2} (46.5/sq mi)
- Time zone: UTC+01:00 (CET)
  - Summer (DST): UTC+02:00 (CEST)
- INSEE/Postal code: 55321 /55100
- ^{1} French Land Register data, which excludes lakes, ponds, glaciers > 1 km^{2} (0.386 sq mi or 247 acres) and river estuaries.

Marre (French pronunciation: [maʁ]) is a commune in the Meuse department in Grand Est in north-eastern France.

== See also ==
- Communes of the Meuse department
