= Jacqueline Thome-Patenôtre =

French politician

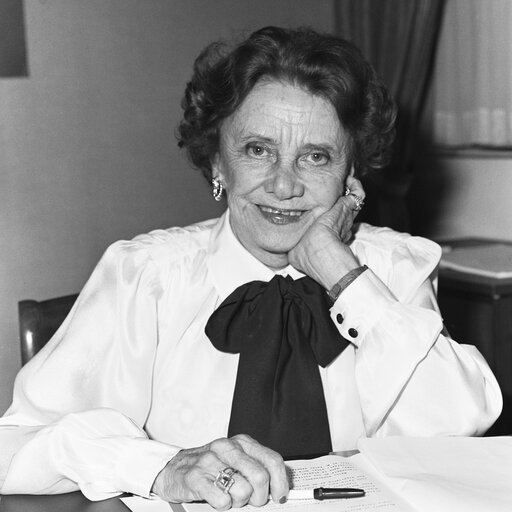
- Jacqueline Thome-Patenôtre
- Born: February 3, 1906; Paris, France
- Died: June 2, 1995 (aged 89); Paris, France
- Occupation: Politician
- Spouse: Raymond Patenôtre
- Parent: André Thome
- Relatives: Jules Patenôtre des Noyers (father-in-law); Marguerite Daisy Soldati-Thome, Comtesse de Contades (1907–2001) (sister), wife of Agostino Giorgio Soldati

Jacqueline Thome-Patenôtre (February 3, 1906 – June 2, 1995) was a French politician. She served as a member of the National Assembly from 1958 to 1973, representing first Seine-et-Oise and later Yvelines.
