= Étienne Pariset =

French physician and psychiatrist

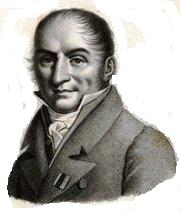
Étienne Pariset

Étienne Pariset (5 August 1770 in Grand – 3 July 1847 in Paris) was a French medical doctor and psychiatrist.

In 1805 he received his medical doctorate in Paris with the thesis Dissertation sur les hémorrhagies utérines ("Dissertation on uterine hemorrhages"). In 1814 he joined Bicêtre Hospital as a physician, and in 1819 he was named head of department for mental illness at the hospital. In 1822, he was appointed perpetual secretary at the Académie Nationale de Médecine, a position he maintained up until his death. From January 1826, he was associated with the Salpêtrière Hospital, where he succeeded Jean-Étienne Dominique Esquirol as physician for the insane.

In 1819–22, he distinguished himself in his work combatting yellow fever in Spain, and from 1828 onward he conducted research of infectious diseases in Syria and Egypt. In the latter country, he became good friends with archaeologist Jean-François Champollion.

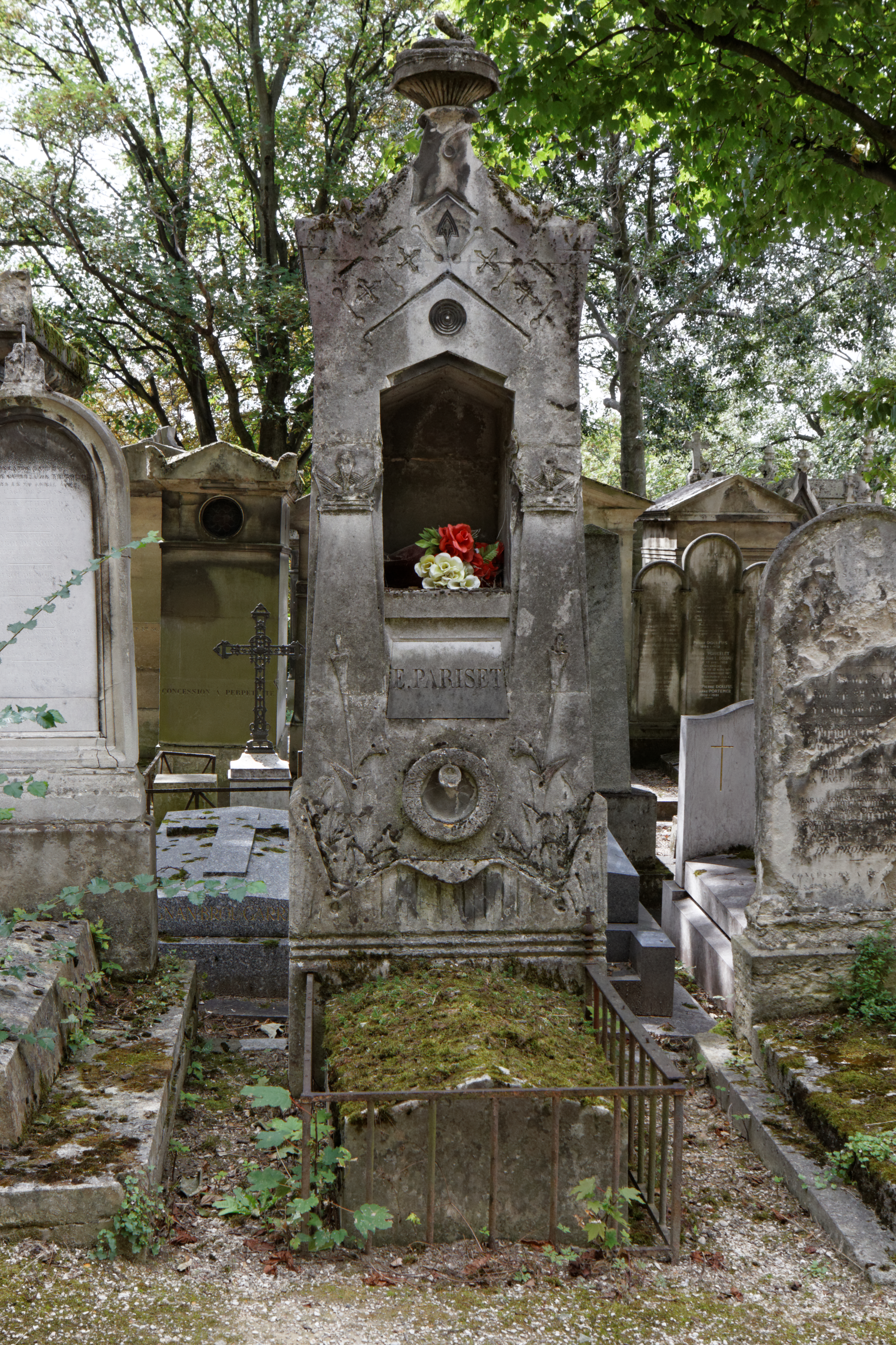
Gravesite of Étienne Pariset at Père-Lachaise Cemetery - Division 27.

In 1819, he became part of the Commission pour l'amélioration du sort des aliénés (Commission for improving the lot of the insane), whose members included Esquirol, Philippe Pinel and Antoine-Athanase Royer-Collard. In 1845, he was a founding member of the Société Protectrice des Animaux (SPA), serving as its first president up until his death in 1847.

== Selected works ==
- Observations sur la fièvre jaune faites à Cadix en 1819, 1820 – Observations on yellow fever, made in Cádiz, in 1819.
- Histoire médicale de la fièvre jaune observée en Espagne et particulièrement en Catalogne dans l'année 1821, 1823 – Medical history of yellow fever seen in Spain and particularly in Catalonia in 1821.
- Mémoire sur les causes de la peste et sur les moyens de la détruire, 1831 – On the causes of the plague, and how to destroy it.
- Histoire des membres de l'Académie royale de médecine; ou, Recueil des éloges lus dans les séances publiques, 1845 – History on members of the Royal Academy of Medicine.
