= Joëlle Timsit =

French diplomat

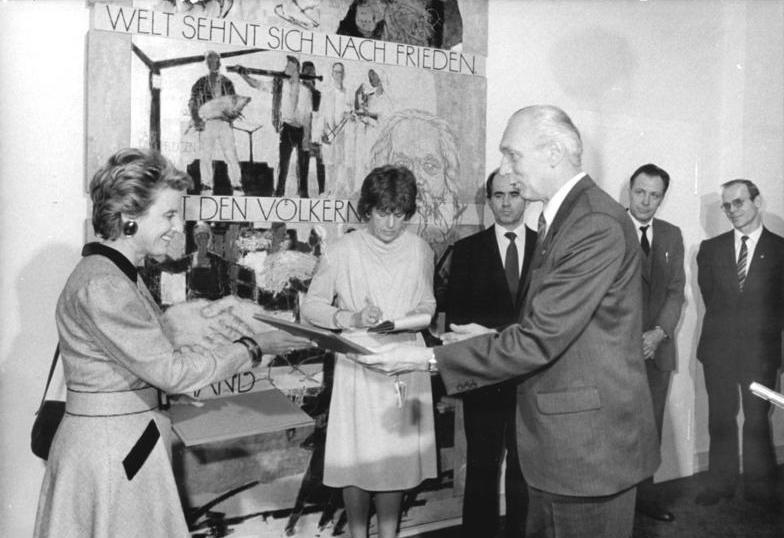
- Joëlle Timsit (left) in 1987 in East Berlin

Ambassador of France to East Germany
- In office 12 March 1986 – 2 October 1990
- Preceded by: Maurice Deshors
- Succeeded by: Serge Boidevaix (German reunification)

Ambassador of France to Sweden
- In office 8 December 1992 – 10 April 1996
- Preceded by: Philippe Louët
- Succeeded by: Philippe Petit

Personal details
- Born: Marie-Paule Adrienne Joëlle Jaffray; 1 May 1938 (age 87) Rennes, France
- Spouse: Gérard Timsit

Marie-Paule Adrienne Joëlle Timsit (née Jaffray; born 1 May 1938) is a French diplomat.

== Biography ==
Timsit is the daughter of Madame Oemoire, professor of physics, and Georges Jaffray. On 8 April 1965, she married the lawyer Gérard Timsit (* 1935). She studied German and political science and graduated from the École nationale d’administration. From 1964 to 1968, she was the second class embassy secretary in Bonn. For several years she headed the Section d’Europe central Central Europe on the Quai d’Orsay. On 12 March 1986, she was appointed French ambassador to East Germany. The embassy was located on Unter den Linden 40 and looked after around 2000 French citizens. She was ambassador to Stockholm from 8 December 1992 to 10 April 1996.
