= List of ambassadors of France to Morocco =

French Ambassadors to Morocco

Ambassador of the French Republic to the Kingdom of Morocco
- Ambassadeur de la République française auprès de la royaume du Maroc
- Arms of the French Republic
- Incumbent; Christophe Lecourtier since December 15, 2022
- Style: His Excellency
- Nominator: Minister of Europe and Foreign Affairs
- Appointer: President of France; with Council of Ministers meeting
- Inaugural holder: André-Louis Dubois
- Formation: 1956

The list of ambassadors of France to Morocco began in 1956 with Morocco's independence from France. The official title of this French diplomat is "Ambassador Extraordinary and Plenipotentiary of the French Republic to the Kingdom of Morocco".

During the protectorate, the Resident General was the official representative of the French government in Rabat. Prior to that, and between 1767 and 1863, France held a consulate general in Tangier, then a legation until 1907. Consulates were held at other Moroccan cities in various periods as well.

== History ==
=== Embassy ===
The French embassy and consulate general are at 49, Allal ben Abdallah in Rabat.

=== Consulates ===
Besides the one in Rabat, there are five other consulates general in Morocco, based in:

- Agadir
- Casablanca
- Fez
- Marrakesh
- Tangier

There are also three honorary consuls located at:

- Essaouira
- Safi
- Oujda

=== List of ambassadors since 1956 ===
Begins	Ends	Ambassador	Note
1956	1956	André-Louis Dubois	
1956	1957	Roger Lalouette	Chargé d'affaires ad interim
1957	1960	Alexandre Parodi	
1960	1962	Roger Seydoux Fornier de Clausonne	
1962	1965	Pierre de Leusse	
1965	1970	Robert Gillet	
1970	1973	Claude Lebel	
1973	1978	Jean-Bernard Raimond	
1978	1980	Jean Herly	
1980	1983	Jacques Morizet	
1983	1985	Roger Vaurs	
1985	1987	Philippe Cuvillier	
1987	1991	Jean-Bernard Mérimée	
1991	1993	Michel Lévêque	
1993	1995	Henri Benoît de Coignac	
1995	2002	Michel de Bonnecorse Benault de Lubières	
2002	2004	Frédéric Grasset	
2004	2006	Philippe Faure	
2006	2009	Jean-François Thibault	
2009	2012	Bruno Joubert	
2012	2015	Charles Fries	
2015	2019	Jean-François Girault	
2019	2022	Hélène Le Gal	
2022	Incumbent	Christophe Lecourtier	

=== List of residents-general in Morocco ===
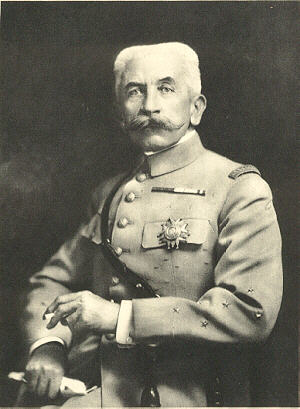
The longest serving Resident-General, Marshal Hubert Lyautey

In 1911, the conquest of Morocco was initiated by the French Third Republic, in the aftermath of the Agadir Crisis. While the conquest itself lasted until 1934, the Treaty of Fes was signed on 30 March 1912. According to the treaty, most of Morocco would become a French protectorate from 1912 to 1956, when the country regained its independence. The Resident-General of France in Morocco, officially named Resident Commissioner General, was the official representative of the French government in Rabat during the French protectorate period. For 44 years, from Lyautey to Dubois (who became the first French ambassador to independent Morocco), there were fourteen Residents General who succeeded one another.

Begins	Ends	Ambassador	Note
1912	1925	Hubert Lyautey	
1925	1929	Théodore Steeg	
1929	1933	Lucien Saint	
1933	1936	Henri Ponsot	
1936	1936	Marcel Peyrouton	
1936	1943	Charles Noguès	
1943	1946	Gabriel Puaux	
1946	1947	Eirik Labonne	
1947	1951	Alphonse Juin	
1951	1954	Augustin Guillaume	
1954	1955	Francis Lacoste	
1955	1955	Gilbert Grandval	
1955	1955	Pierre Boyer de Latour	
1955	1956	André-Louis Dubois	Became first ambassador to Morocco.

== See also ==
- List of diplomatic missions in Morocco
- List of diplomatic missions of France
- France–Morocco relations
- List of French residents-general in Morocco
