= André Puget (diplomat) =

Général André Jean-Baptiste Marie Gabriel Puget (29 January 1911 – 26 January 1973) was a French diplomat, and the first (joint) chief executive of the Concorde supersonic airliner project.

== Early life ==
He was born in Nantes in the Loire-Atlantique department, in north-west France. He attended the École spéciale militaire de Saint-Cyr in 1929, leaving in 1931.

== Career ==
=== Second World War ===
During the Second World War, he worked with the Free French Forces in the UK, flying as a bomber pilot with the Free French Air Forces. He was awarded the Distinguished Service Order (DSO). He flew the Handley Page Halifax with 346 Squadron in North Yorkshire.

=== French Air Force ===
He became an officer in the French Air Force. From 1961–62 he was Chief of the Defence Staff.

=== Sud Aviation ===
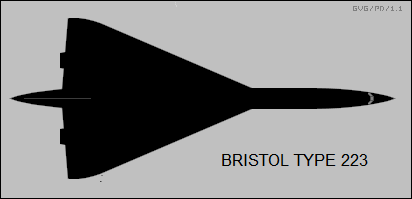
Concorde started as the BAC 223

He was head of Sud Aviation from 23 July 1962, and was responsible for getting the Concorde project going, as a joint chief executive. The name Concorde had been thought up by the 18-year-old son of the sales director of BAC; the 'e' was added to Concorde on 11 December 1967. Sud Aviation became part of Aérospatiale in 1970.

In negotiations to build Concorde in early 1962, there was no progress made between the French and English companies; Georges Hereil of Sud Aviation wanted to build to the French design, and BAC wanted the plane to be built as the BAC 223 (Bristol Type 223). Hereil being replaced by 51-year-old Puget in 1962 enabled a compromise to be made; Hereil left at the end of June 1962. The agreement to build Concorde was signed on 29 November 1962.

On 5 November 1965, he took Prince Philip, Duke of Edinburgh around the Sud Aviation factory in southern France, where the Duke demonstrated his command of the French language. On 5 December 1966, he took the Soviet Prime Minister Alexei Kosygin on a tour around the factory, including taking Kosygin briefly inside Concorde 001, which was being built; at the time, Concorde was due to first fly on 28 February 1968.

Puget was replaced in 1967 by the controversial Maurice Papon. Papon would not last long at Sud Aviation, being replaced by Henri Ziegler, who had also flown with the Free French Air Force during the war.

=== Diplomat ===
From 1967–1970 he was the French ambassador to Sweden, at the Embassy of France, Stockholm.

=== Business school ===
From 1970–1973 he was Director of the HEC Paris in Jouy-en-Josas.

== Personal life ==
He married Thérèse Péquin (2 December 1915 – 30 March 2009) in 1936, and they had three daughters. He died in 1973 in Suresnes, in the west of Paris, aged 61; he is buried in Le Pouliguen on the French west coast. His wife died aged 93 in Le Chesnay, in the west of Paris.

Business positions
Preceded by Georges Hereil	Chief Executive of Sud Aviation; July 1962 - 1967	Succeeded by Maurice Papon
