= Embassy of France, Stockholm =

Coordinates: 59°12′07″N 18°02′40″E

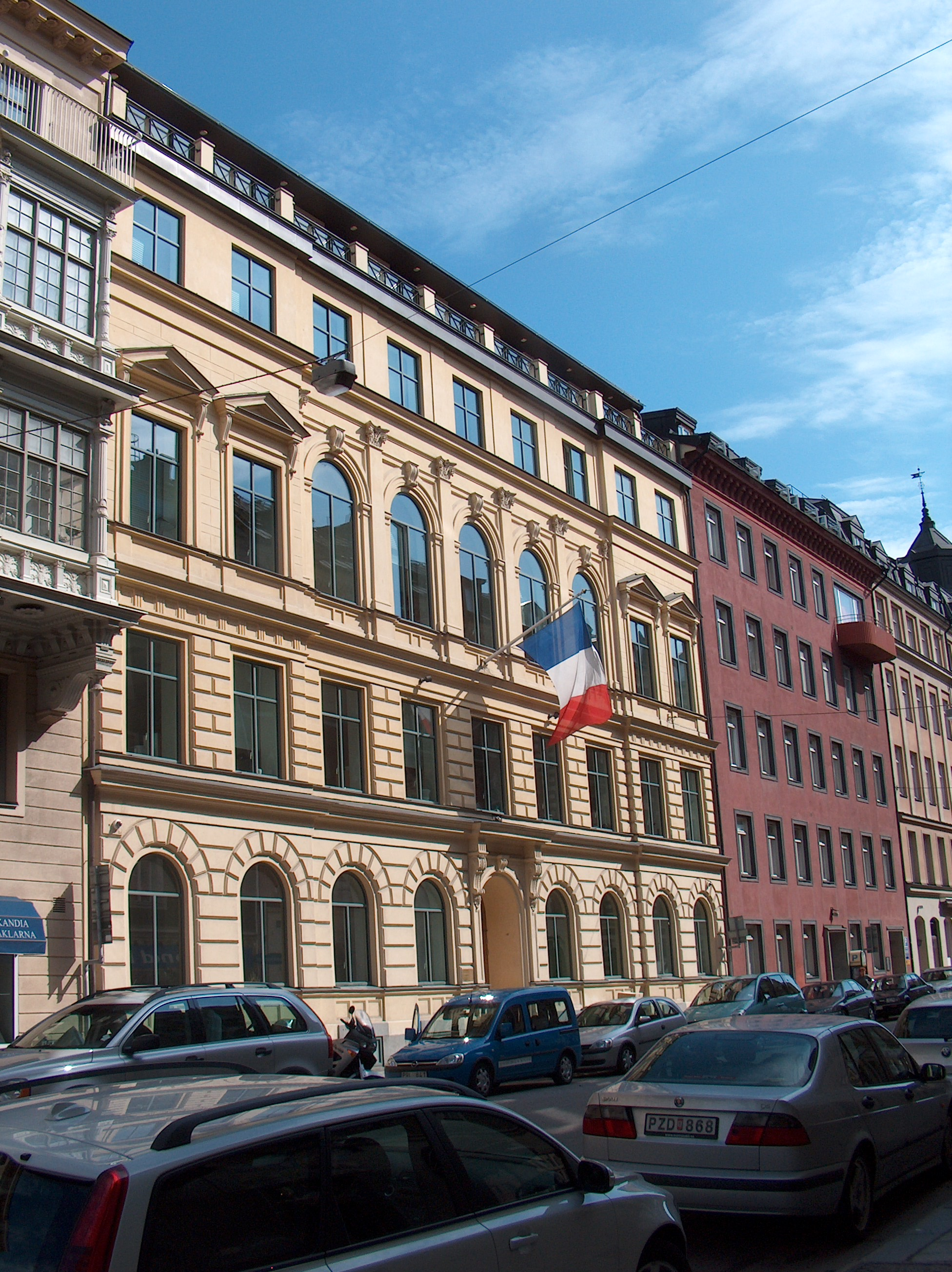
External view of the Embassy of France in Sweden.

The Embassy of France in Stockholm is the diplomatic mission of the French Republic in Sweden. The chancery is located at Kommendörsgatan 13.

== The embassy ==
The embassy is located in the district of Östermalm in the heart of Stockholm, the Swedish capital. The building was built in 1876 by Swedish architect C.A Olsson and it was used as a school until 1974. The French State bought it in 1987 after it had been left empty since the closing of the school some 13 years before. After 14 months of intensive renovation work, the chancery moved there in 1997. The French Institute in Stockholm shares the building located just across the street with the embassy of Greece. Along with the chancery, the embassy has a press and information service, a military service and a cultural and scientific service. Overall some 60 people work at the embassy.

Since September 2020, the ambassador is Etienne Le Harivel de Gonneville.

== French Residency ==
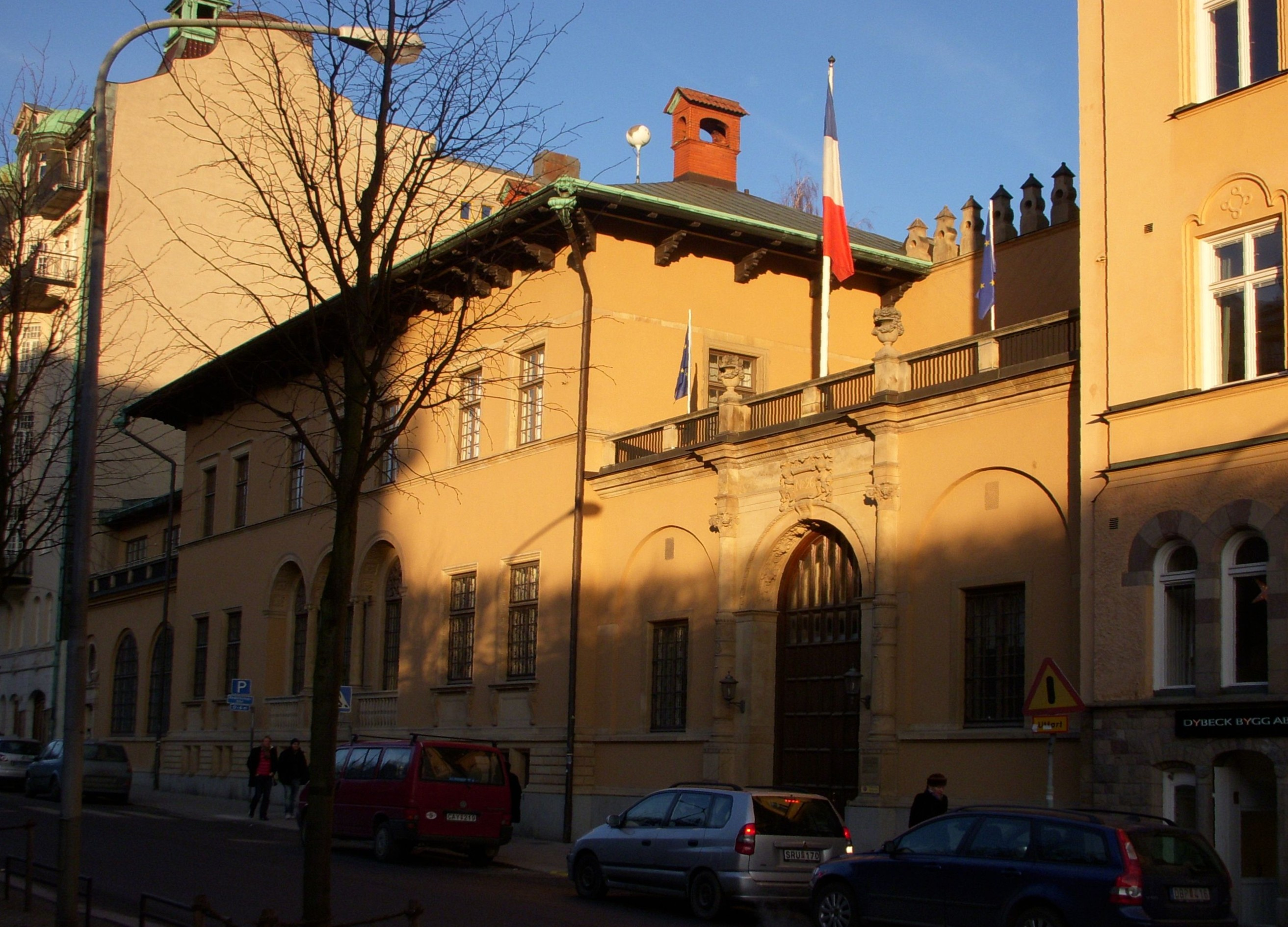
Bromska palatset

The French Residency is one of the last town houses built in Stockholm. It is named the "Hôtel Broms" or "Bromska palatset" and is located on Narvavägen 26. The house was built by Emil Broms, who was the main share-holder of mining companies in Gällivare (Northern Sweden). He had the house built for his family on a land he bought in the heart of the district of Östermalm. The property was bought by the French state in 1921 and it officially became the Embassy of France in Sweden in 1947. While the different services have moved in 1997 to Kommendörsgatan 13, the Hôtel Broms is now the official residency of the French ambassador in Sweden.

== See also ==
- France–Sweden relations
