= Épuration légale =

French purge of collaborationists after World War II

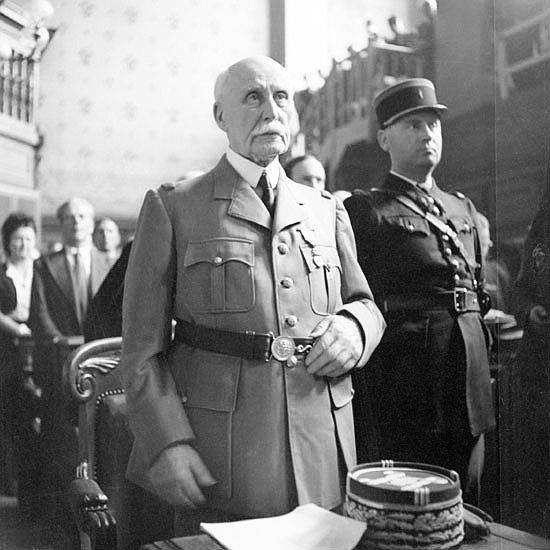
Philippe Pétain, head of the Vichy regime, during his trial before the Haute Cour de justice in Paris on 30 July 1945.

The épuration légale (lit. 'legal purge') was the wave of official trials and administrative sanctions conducted in France following the liberation and the collapse of the Vichy regime.

Instituted by the Provisional Government of the French Republic (GPRF) under Charles de Gaulle, the formal legal purge was designed to re-establish the rule of law and replace the épuration sauvage ("wild purge")—the preceding phase of summary executions, arbitrary detentions, and extrajudicial reprisals carried out by local Resistance fighters and civilians.

Unlike the international Nuremberg trials, the épuration légale was conducted entirely as a domestic French judicial process. Approximately 300,000 cases were investigated, reaching into the civil administration, judiciary, press, and highest levels of the collaborationist government. More than half of these investigations were closed without indictment.

Between 1944 and 1951, special Courts of Justice (cours de justice) and the High Court of Justice pronounced 6,763 death sentences (3,910 of them in absentia). Of the 2,853 defendants sentenced to death in person, roughly 73 percent were commuted by de Gaulle, resulting in 791 judicial executions, including those of Vichy leaders Pierre Laval and Joseph Darnand, and the collaborationist writer Robert Brasillach. Far more common were sentences of dégradation nationale (loss of civic rights) under the newly created offense of indignité nationale, which was imposed on nearly 50,000 people. The purge phase effectively concluded with the general parliamentary amnesty laws of 1951 and 1953.

== Political context ==
=== Competing models of authority ===
As Allied forces advanced through France in 1944, the Provisional Government of the French Republic (GPRF) under General Charles de Gaulle sought to establish administrative and judicial control while navigating several competing precedents:

- The North African administration: Following the Allied landings in French North Africa during Operation Torch in November 1942, General Henri Giraud assumed civilian and military command in Algiers upon the assassination of Vichy Admiral François Darlan, initially retaining much of Vichy's administrative apparatus and anti-Semitic legislation. Following the merger of Giraud's North African command and de Gaulle's Free French in June 1943 to form the French Committee of National Liberation (CFLN), French authorities demonstrated that French territory liberated from German occupation or Vichy administration could restore republican authority, remove collaborators, and marshal its own defense without Allied military supervision. De Gaulle viewed this autonomous arrangement as the primary model for governing mainland France upon liberation.
- The Italian model: Following the Armistice of Cassibile and the overthrow of Mussolini in 1943, southern Italy was placed under the direct control of the Allied Military Government of Occupied Territories (AMGOT), leaving the Italian government subordinate to Allied military oversight. De Gaulle viewed this setup as a cautionary example of compromised sovereignty, explicitly rejecting what he termed the "Italian solution" in his memoirs:

We could not accept that the administration of France be handed over to an Allied military command, as had been done in Italy... France was not an enemy territory to be placed under tutelage, but an ally resuming her sovereignty.

— Charles de Gaulle, Mémoires de guerre: L'Unité, 1942–1944

Thus de Gaulle insisted that liberated France adopt a solution both self-sovereign and orderly.

- The épuration sauvage: During the summer of 1944, the rapid collapse of the German occupation and the Vichy government created a power vacuum across mainland France. Local Resistance groups and civilian crowds carried out an estimated 9,000 to 10,000 summary executions targeting suspected informants, municipal officials, and members of the Milice, alongside the public head-shaving (tonte) of roughly 20,000 women accused of "horizontal collaboration".

The GPRF viewed the épuration sauvage as a direct threat to public order and republican legitimacy, while fearing that sustained civil unrest would provide Allied leadership with grounds to impose military governance. To restore state authority and centralize judicial power, the Provisional Government deployed regional commissioners (Commissaires de la République) and established special domestic tribunals, channeling popular demands for retribution into the formal legal framework of the épuration légale.

== Constitutional and legal context ==
=== Pre-war constitution and statutory framework ===
The legal foundation of the purge rested on the doctrine of republican continuity. Under the GPRF's Ordinance of 9 August 1944 on the Restoration of Republican Legality, the Vichy regime was declared illegitimate ab initio:

- The Constitutional Law of 10 July 1940—which granted constituent power to Marshal Philippe Pétain—along with all subsequent constitutional acts, were declared null and void.
- The constitutional framework of the Third Republic was declared to have legally persisted, although its parliamentary institutions remained suspended in favor of provisional rule by decree. While Vichy's discriminatory and exceptional edicts were annulled, all pre-war statutory legislation was confirmed as continuously in force.
- Treason and aiding the enemy were judged under Articles 75 through 83 of the pre-war 1810 Penal Code (as amended in 1939). The GPRF maintained that the 1940 armistice was merely a military ceasefire, not a legal peace treaty; France remained continuously at war with Germany, meaning any material aid given to the occupier met the statutory definition of treason.

=== Wartime tribunals and the Algiers precedent ===
The institutional template for the mainland purge was developed in French North Africa between 1943 and 1944:

- On 18 August 1943, the CFLN established an official purge commission in Algiers to investigate colonial administrators and military personnel who had collaborated with Axis authorities or resisted Allied landings.
- In October 1943, the CFLN created a special military tribunal in Algiers. Its most prominent defendant, former Vichy Interior Minister Pierre Pucheu, was convicted of treason and executed by firing squad in March 1944. The trial established the legal principle that high-ranking state functionaries could not claim obedience to hierarchical superiors as a defense for acts violating republican law.

=== Statutory creations: Indignité nationale ===
Prosecuting collaboration under existing pre-war treason statutes presented a major legal challenge: Article 75 carried mandatory capital punishment or hard labor, which was disproportionate for low-level collaboration, political sympathizers, or collaborationist journalists. Standard criminal statutes could not easily penalize non-violent political collaboration without violating the principle against retroactive criminal law (nullum crimen sine lege). To resolve this, the GPRF issued the Ordinance of 26 August 1944 establishing the new offense of indignité nationale ("national unworthiness"):

- It defined the offense as having "given aid directly or indirectly to Germany, harmed the unity of the nation, or violated the national duty of French citizens."
- A conviction resulted in the penalty of dégradation nationale ("national degradation"): the immediate loss of civil, political, and professional rights, including disenfranchisement, prohibition from holding public office, disqualification from teaching or legal practice, and bans on managing corporate enterprises or media outlets.

== Enactment and operation ==
=== Courts of justice and the High Court ===
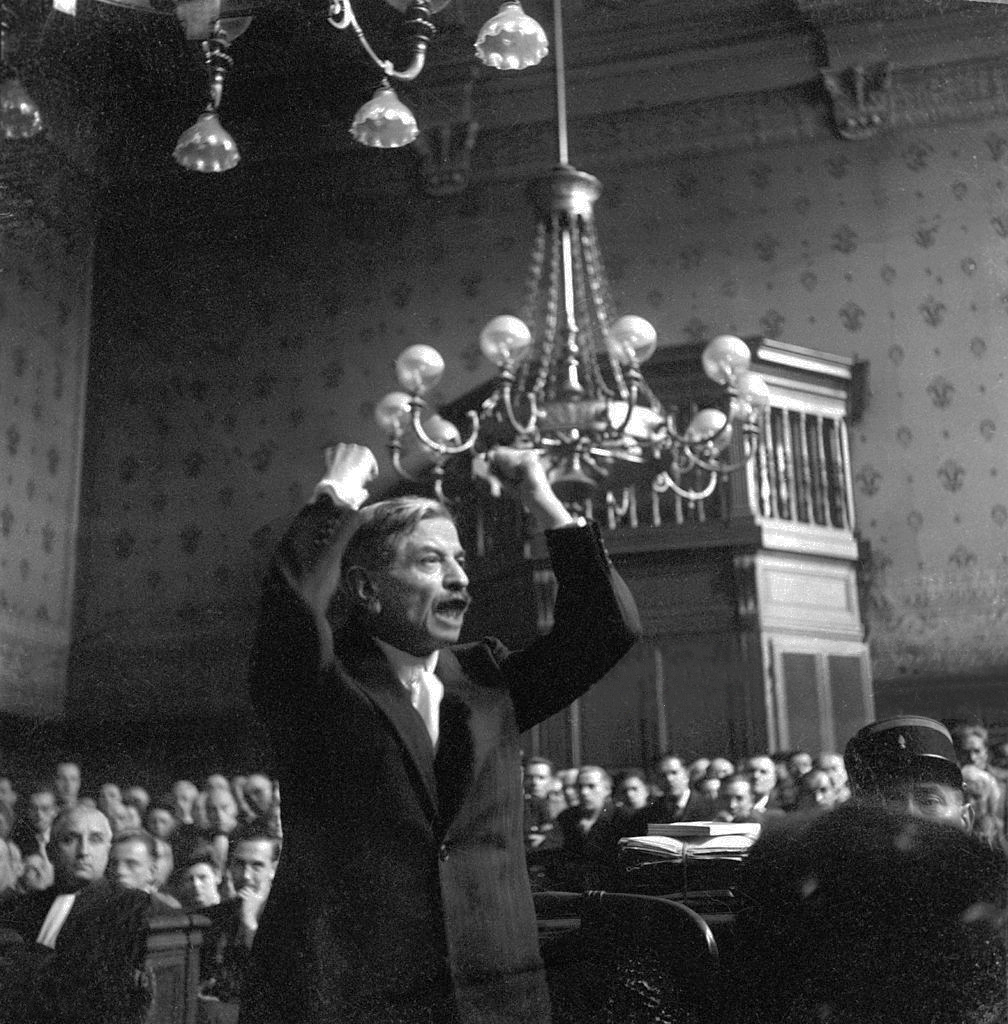
Former Vichy Prime Minister Pierre Laval pleading his case before the High Court of Justice in October 1945.

To judge civilian and political offenses, the Provisional Government established a dual judicial structure separating the trials of top government leaders from those of ordinary collaborators.

==== The High Court of Justice ====
On 18 November 1944, the GPRF issued an ordinance establishing the High Court of Justice (Haute Cour de justice) to try Marshal Philippe Pétain, heads of government, cabinet ministers, secretaries of state, and resident-generals accused of high treason and crimes against the internal and external security of the state. Under the Third Republic, the Senate had sat as the High Court of Justice, but this mechanism had been suspended by the Vichy regime under the Constitutional Act of 30 July 1940.

Because the pre-war Senate had dissolved and the majority of its members had voted full constituent powers to Pétain, the 1944 ordinance instituted a new judicial composition:

- The bench was presided over by the First President of the Court of Cassation, assisted by the President of the Court's Criminal Chamber and the First President of the Paris Court of Appeal.
- Juries consisted of 24 jurors selected by lot from two separate pools of 50 candidates: one pool drawn from members of the Provisional Consultative Assembly representing internal and external Resistance movements, and the other drawn from the Vichy 80—the pre-war parliamentarians who had voted against granting full powers to Pétain on 10 July 1940.

Following the election of the National Constituent Assembly, the law of 27 December 1945 reorganized the court to reflect the new democratic mandate. The professional magistrates were retained, but the 24 jurors were henceforth chosen by lot from a parliamentary list of 96 deputies, allocated proportionally according to political party representation. The court was modified by subsequent statutes on 15 September 1947 and 19 April 1948 to expedite remaining dockets before completing its final trials in 1949.

==== Departmental Courts of Justice and Civic Sections ====
General collaboration offenses across France were handled at the regional level under the Ordinance of 26 June 1944, which established 90 departmental Courts of Justice (cours de justice) alongside attached Civic Sections (chambres civiques):

- Courts of Justice: Handled serious penal offenses under Articles 75–83 of the Penal Code. Each court was composed of a single professional judge and four citizen-jurors appointed by local departmental liberation committees (CDLs).
- Civic Sections: Sat without a jury to adjudicate non-capital misdemeanors of political or economic collaboration, specifically applying the penalty of dégradation nationale for the newly created offense of indignité nationale.

=== Arrest, detention, and internment of the accused ===
Following the liberation of Paris and the regions in the summer of 1944, the Provisional Government faced the logistical problem of detaining tens of thousands of suspected collaborators. Former internment centers and transit camps previously operated by the Vichy regime—such as the Drancy internment camp, the Vélodrome d'Hiver, the Gurs internment camp, and the Camp des Milles—were repurposed to hold detainees awaiting judicial examination. In Paris, local Resistance committees initially supervised Drancy until the National Gendarmerie assumed formal command on 15 September 1944.

Standard detention facilities, notably Fresnes Prison near Paris, held prominent political, cultural, and industrial figures accused of collaboration, including singer Tino Rossi, novelist Pierre Benoit, actress Arletty, and automotive industrialist Louis Renault, who died in custody in October 1944 while awaiting trial.

==== Administrative internment framework ====
To regularize detentions that had begun as informal arrests by local Resistance factions, the GPRF enacted the Ordinance of 4 October 1944, granting departmental prefects emergency statutory powers to intern individuals deemed dangerous to national security or public order until the cessation of hostilities. At its peak in late 1944, administrative internment held an estimated 70,000 to 80,000 persons nationwide. For many detainees, transfer to state-controlled internment camps provided protection against vigilante reprisals and extrajudicial violence during the ongoing épuration sauvage.

==== Supervision and camp closures ====
On 31 October 1944, Minister of the Interior Adrien Tixier established departmental supervisory commissions (commissions de contrôle des internements administratifs) tasked with reviewing internment warrants, releasing individuals held without evidence, and regulating house arrests (résidences forcées). The GPRF also permitted the International Committee of the Red Cross to inspect the camps and evaluate living conditions.

As civil administration stabilized, the GPRF restricted the scope of extrajudicial detentions:

- On 30 August 1945, Tixier issued an executive circular prohibiting any new administrative internments, directing that subsequent arrests be handled solely through standard judicial warrants, except in cases of suspected espionage or severe black market speculation.
- The Act of 10 May 1946 officially established the legal date for the cessation of hostilities in metropolitan France.
- Following this statute, remaining administrative internment orders lapsed, and all special internment camps across the country were cleared and closed by the end of May 1946, leaving all unresolved cases in the jurisdiction of the formal court system.

== Trials ==
The first high official tried in the purge was Jean-Pierre Esteva, Resident General of France in Tunisia. He was sentenced to detention for life on 15 March 1945, avoiding capital punishment because the court recognised that he had assisted patriots in May 1943, just before leaving Tunisia. Esteva was pardoned on 11 August 1950 due to illness, and died a few months later.

The trial of Pétain began on 23 July 1945. Pétain's defense lawyer, Jacques Isorni, pointed out that the public prosecutor, André Mornet, had also been in charge of the failed Riom Trials organized by Pétain under the Vichy regime. This did not sway the presiding judge, Pierre Mongibeaux, who had himself sworn allegiance to Pétain in 1941. The 89-year-old Marshal was sentenced to death on 15 August, but his sentence was commuted to life imprisonment by General de Gaulle. He lived six more years, imprisoned on the Île d'Yeu.

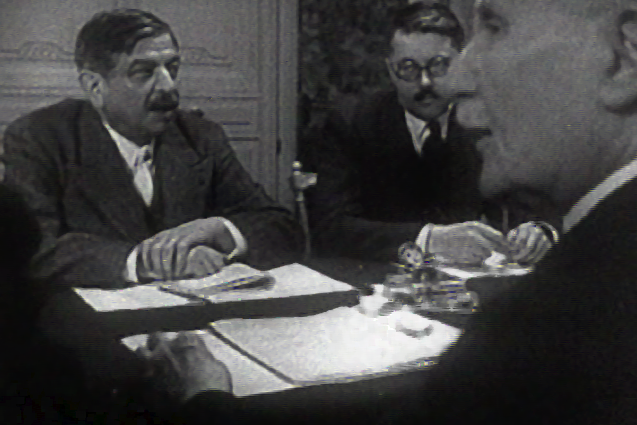
Pierre Laval as seen in the Frank Capra documentary film Divide and Conquer (1943)

Pierre Laval, the French Prime Minister from July to December 1940 and from April 1942 to August 1944, had fled to Francoist Spain. Franco expelled him to Innsbruck in Austria, located in the U.S. Occupation Zone. Laval was extradited to French authorities and his trial commenced in October 1945. In a contentious and rushed trial, he was sentenced to death by the jury on 9 October 1945 and executed by firing squad at Fresnes Prison a week later.

=== High Court verdicts ===
By 1 July 1949, the High Court of Justice had adjudicated 108 cases, 106 of which involved former Vichy government ministers, secretaries of state, and high commissioners:

- Extinguished proceedings: Eight defendants died before their cases could come to trial, resulting in proceedings being dropped, including Minister of Industrial Production Jean Bichelonne.
- Acquittals and dismissals: Three defendants were formally acquitted, including former Interior Minister Marcel Peyrouton. An additional 42 cases were dismissed without conviction (non-lieux), including those of former Education Minister Jérôme Carcopino and Agriculture Minister Jacques Le Roy Ladurie.
- Capital sentences: Eighteen death sentences were pronounced:
  - Carried out: Three executions were conducted by firing squad: former Prime Minister Pierre Laval, Milice head Joseph Darnand, and Fernand de Brinon, the Vichy delegate to the German authorities in Paris.
  - Commuted: Five capital sentences were commuted to life or term imprisonment, including those of Marshal Philippe Pétain, Army of the Levant commander Henri Dentz, and former Justice Minister Raphaël Alibert (who drafted the first Law on the status of Jews).
  - In absentia: Ten death sentences were pronounced in absentia against figures who had fled abroad, notably Commissioner for Jewish Affairs Louis Darquier de Pellepoix, Justice Minister Maurice Gabolde, and Education Minister Abel Bonnard.
- Forced labor: Eight defendants received terms of forced labor (travaux forcés), including Minister of Foreign Affairs Paul Baudouin, Education Minister Jacques Chevalier, resident-general Charles Noguès, and life sentences for Navy Secretary Gabriel Auphan and Labor Minister Hubert Lagardelle.
- Imprisonment: Fourteen individuals were sentenced to standard prison terms, including Finance Minister Yves Bouthillier, Admiral André Marquis, and Admiral Henri Bléhaut; a sentence of life imprisonment was handed down to Resident-General Jean-Pierre Esteva.
- National degradation: Fifteen defendants were sentenced solely to dégradation nationale, including diplomat François Piétri and former Interior Minister Adrien Marquet. In seven of these cases, the penalty was suspended due to documented contributions to the Resistance, such as that of Minister of State Jean Ybarnégaray.

Between 1954 and 1960, the High Court judged prisoners who had been sentenced in absentia or had subsequently surrendered. More than a decade having passed, the court showed greater leniency; for example, former Moroccan Resident-General Charles Noguès, who had been sentenced in absentia to 20 years of forced labour in November 1947, had his sentence of indignité nationale suspended upon returning to France in October 1956.

== See also ==
- Purge of the French Civil Service (1879–1884)
- Raymond Abellio, condemned in absentia to 20 years of prison, granted amnesty in 1952
- Jacques de Bernonville, sentenced to capital punishment in absentia
- Abel Bonnard, Minister of National Education under Vichy, condemned in absentia to death, granted political asylum by Franco.
- René Bousquet, granted amnesty (judged in the early 1980s, along with Jean Leguay, for his role in the Vel' d'Hiv Roundup of July 1942)
- Robert Brasillach, anti-Semitic journalist, executed in February 1945
- Marcel Bucard, leader of the Mouvement Franciste, executed in 1946
- Louis-Ferdinand Céline, writer, convicted in absentia to one year of prison and dégradation nationale, then granted amnesty
- Marcel Déat, founder of the National Popular Rally (RNP), sentenced to capital punishment in absentia
- Émile Dewoitine, condemned in absentia, fled to Argentina
- Roland Gaucher, condemned to five years of prison
- Yann Goulet, sentenced to death in absentia, fled to Ireland and became an Irish citizen in 1952
- Roparz Hemon, imprisoned for one year and given a ten years indignité nationale sentence
- Alan Heusaff, sentenced to death in absentia, fled to Ireland and was amnestied in 1967
- Jean Hérold-Paquis, broadcaster on Radio Paris, executed
- Étienne Léandri, fought under the uniform of the Gestapo, but was not judged
- Jean Mamy, film director and journalist, condemned to death and executed at the fortress of Montrouge on 29 March 1949
- Charles Maurras, given a life sentence in January 1945, released in 1952 for health reasons
- Maurice Papon, police administrator, escaped judgment by a CDL, finally found guilty of crimes against humanity in the 1990s
- Henri-Robert Petit, former editor-in-chief of the Collaborationist newspaper Le Pilori, condemned in November 1947 in absentia to 20 years of prison and dégradation nationale. Granted amnesty in 1959
- Lucien Rebatet, sentenced to capital punishment in 1946, commuted to forced labour in 1947, amnestied in 1952
- Paul Touvier, sentenced to capital punishment in absentia, arrested in 1989 and judged for crimes against humanity
- Xavier Vallat, granted amnesty
