= List of French residents-general in Tunisia =

Resident-General of France in Tunisia
- Résident général de France au Tunisie
- Flag of Tunisia with French canton

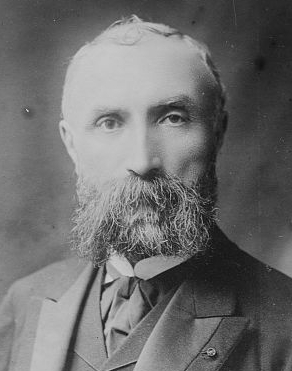
- Longest serving Gabriel Alapetite; 7 February 1907 – 26 October 1918
- Reports to: Head of State of France
- Residence: Embassy of France
- Seat: Tunis
- Formation: 23 June 1885
- First holder: Paul Cambon
- Final holder: Roger Seydoux
- Abolished: 20 March 1956

French Tunisia (dark blue) within other French possessions in Africa (light blue), 1913.

In 1881, the conquest of Tunisia was initiated by the French Third Republic. The invasion began on 28 April 1881, and lasted until 28 October 1881. Meanwhile, the Treaty of Bardo was signed on 12 May 1881. According to the treaty, the Beylik of Tunis would become a French protectorate from 1881 to 1956, when Tunisia regained its independence as the Kingdom of Tunisia.

== List ==
(Dates in italics indicate de facto continuation of office)

Tenure	Incumbent	Notes	Portrait
13 May 1881 to 28 February 1882	Théodore Roustan, Resident Minister		
28 February 1882 to 23 June 1885	Paul Cambon, Resident Minister		
23 June 1885 to 28 October 1886	Paul Cambon, Resident-General		
23 November 1886 to 5 November 1892	Justin Massicault, Resident-General		
November 1892 to 14 November 1894	Charles Rouvier, Resident-General		
14 November 1894 to November 1900	René Millet, Resident-General		
November 1900 to 27 December 1901	Benoît de Merkel, Resident-General		
27 December 1901 to 7 February 1907	Stephen Pichon, Resident-General		
7 February 1907 to 26 October 1918	Gabriel Alapetite, Resident-General		
26 October 1918 to 1 January 1921	Étienne Flandin, Resident-General		
1 January 1921 to 2 January 1929	Lucien Saint, Resident-General		
18 February 1929 to 29 July 1933	François Manceron, Resident-General		
29 July 1933 to 21 March 1936	Marcel Peyrouton, Resident-General	1st term	
17 April 1936 to 18 October 1938	Armand Guillon, Resident-General		
22 November 1938 to 3 June 1940	Eirik Labonne, Resident-General		
3 June 1940 to 22 July 1940	Marcel Peyrouton, Resident-General	2nd term	
26 July 1940 to 10 May 1943	Jean-Pierre Esteva, Resident-General	Repatriated to Vichy France by the Germans at the end of the Tunisian campaign	
10 May 1943 to 22 February 1947	Charles Mast, Resident-General		
22 February 1947 to 13 June 1950	Jean Mons, Resident-General		
13 June 1950 to 13 January 1952	Louis Périllier, Resident-General		
13 January 1952 to 2 September 1953	Jean de Hauteclocque, Resident-General		
2 September 1953 to 5 November 1954	Pierre Voizard, Resident-General		
5 November 1954 to 31 August 1955	Pierre Boyer de Latour du Moulin, Resident-General		
13 September 1955 to 20 March 1956	Roger Seydoux, High Commissioner		

== See also ==
- Beylik of Tunis
- Kingdom of Tunisia
- French Algeria
  - List of French governors of Algeria
- French protectorate in Morocco
  - List of French residents-general in Morocco

== Sources ==
- http://www.rulers.org/rult.html#tunisia
- African States and Rulers, John Stewart, McFarland
- Heads of State and Government, 2nd Edition, John V da Graca, MacMillan Press (2000)
