= Alphonse Juin =

French Army officer (1888–1967)

Marshal Alphonse Juin
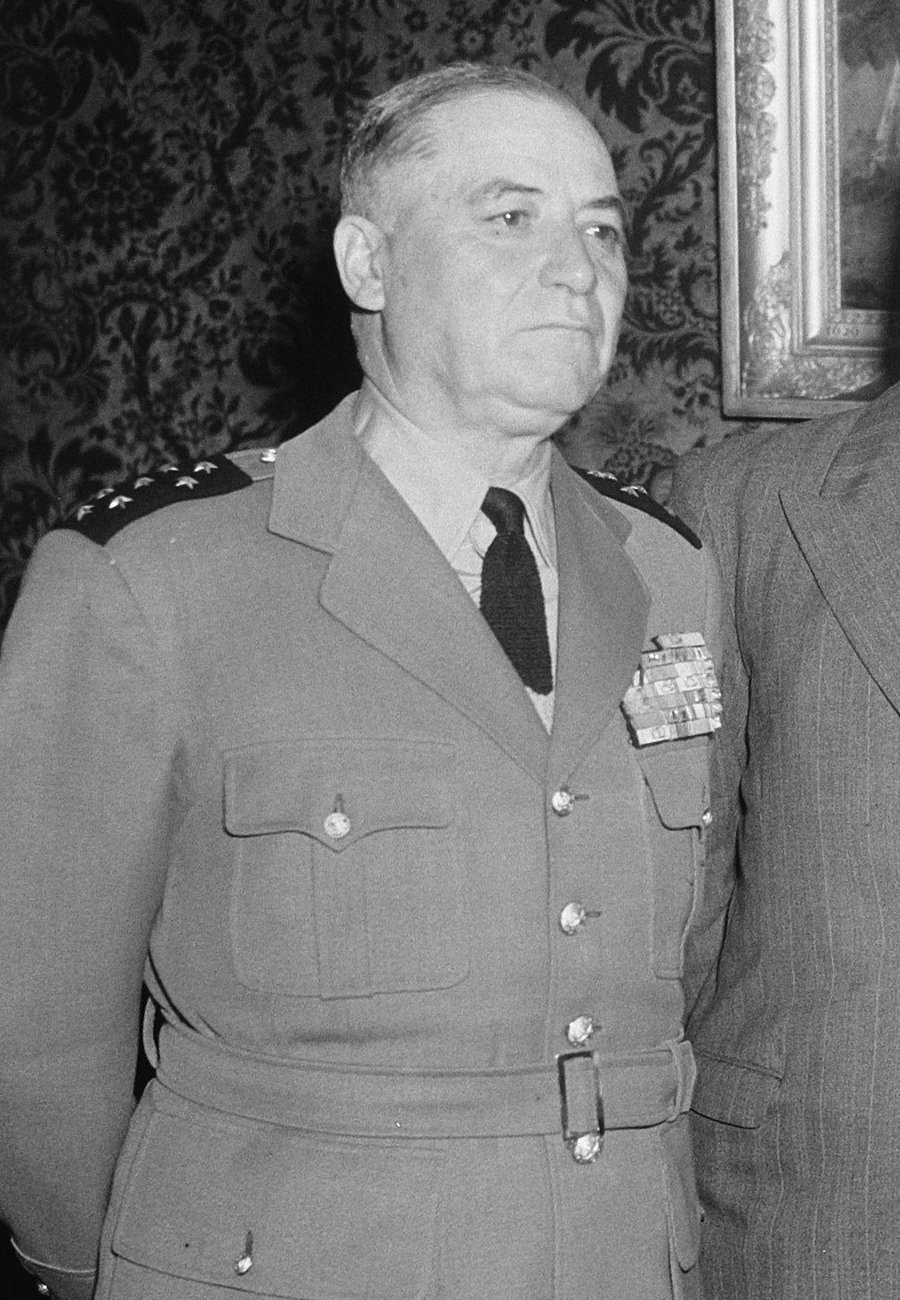
- Juin in 1952

Seat 4 of the Académie française
- In office 20 November 1952 – 27 January 1967
- Preceded by: Jean Tharaud
- Succeeded by: Pierre Emmanuel

Resident-General of France in Morocco
- In office 15 May 1947 – 28 August 1951
- Preceded by: Eirik Labonne
- Succeeded by: Augustin Guillaume

Chief of the Defence Staff
- In office 25 January 1951 – 19 August 1953
- Preceded by: Charles Léchères
- Succeeded by: Paul Ély
- In office 13 August 1944 – 15 May 1947
- Preceded by: Antoine Béthouart
- Succeeded by: Charles Léchères

Personal details
- Born: 16 December 1888 Bône, French Algeria
- Died: 27 January 1967 (aged 78) Paris, French Republic
- Resting place: Les Invalides
- Spouse: Marie Gabrielle Mauricette Cécile Bonnefoy (m. 1928)
- Children: Pierre Juin
- Parents: Victor Pierre Juin (father); Précieuse Salini (mother)
- Education: Grand Lycée d'Alger; École Spéciale Militaire; École Militaire

Military service
- Allegiance: French Third Republic; Vichy France; Free France; French Fourth Republic
- Branch/service: French Army
- Years of service: 1912–1962
- Rank: Army general (Note: Marshal of France is a dignity and not a rank.)
- Unit: List of units: 1st Zouaves Regiment; 1st Algerian Tirailleurs Regiment; 9th Algerian Tirailleurs Regiment; 19th Algerian Tirailleurs Regiment; 3rd Zouaves Regiment
- Commands: List of commands: 3rd Zouaves Regiment; 15th Motorised Infantry Division; French Expeditionary Corps
- Battles/wars: Zaian War First World War List of battles: Battle of Verdun; First Battle of the Marne; First Battle of Champagne; Nivelle Offensive; Rif War; Second World War List of battles: Battle of France; Tunisia Campaign; Italian Campaign; First Indochina War

Army-General Alphonse Pierre Juin (Note: French pronunciation: [alfɔ̃s ʒɥɛ̃]) (16 December 1888 – 27 January 1967) was a French Army officer who served in both world wars. A graduate of the École Spéciale Militaire de Saint-Cyr class of 1912, he served in Morocco in 1914 in command of native troops. Upon the outbreak of the First World War, Juin was sent to the Western Front in France, where he was gravely wounded in 1915. As a result of this wound, he lost the use of his right arm.

After the war, Juin attended the École Supérieure de Guerre and chose to serve in North Africa again. After the outbreak of the Second World War in September 1939, he assumed command of the 15th Motorized Infantry Division. The division was encircled in the Lille pocket during the Battle of France and Juin was captured by German forces. He remained a prisoner of war until being released at the behest of the Vichy Government in 1941, which assigned him to command French forces in North Africa.

Following the Allied invasion of Algeria and Morocco in November 1942, Juin defected to the Allies and ordered French forces in Tunisia to resist the Germans and Italians. He proceeded to command the French Expeditionary Corps in the Italian campaign. Juin's expertise in mountain warfare was crucial in breaking the Gustav Line, which had held up the Allied advance for six months.

Following this assignment, Juin served as Chief of the Defence Staff and represented France at the San Francisco Conference. In 1947 he returned to Africa as the Resident-General of France in Morocco, where he opposed Moroccan attempts to gain independence. Juin was subsequently appointed to a senior NATO position, assuming command of CENTAG until 1956. During his NATO command, he was promoted to Marshal of France in 1952. He was greatly opposed to Charles De Gaulle's decision to grant independence to Algeria, and was "retired" in 1962 as a result. Juin was the French Army's last living Marshal of France until his death in Paris in 1967, when he was buried in Les Invalides near Napoleon.

== Early years ==
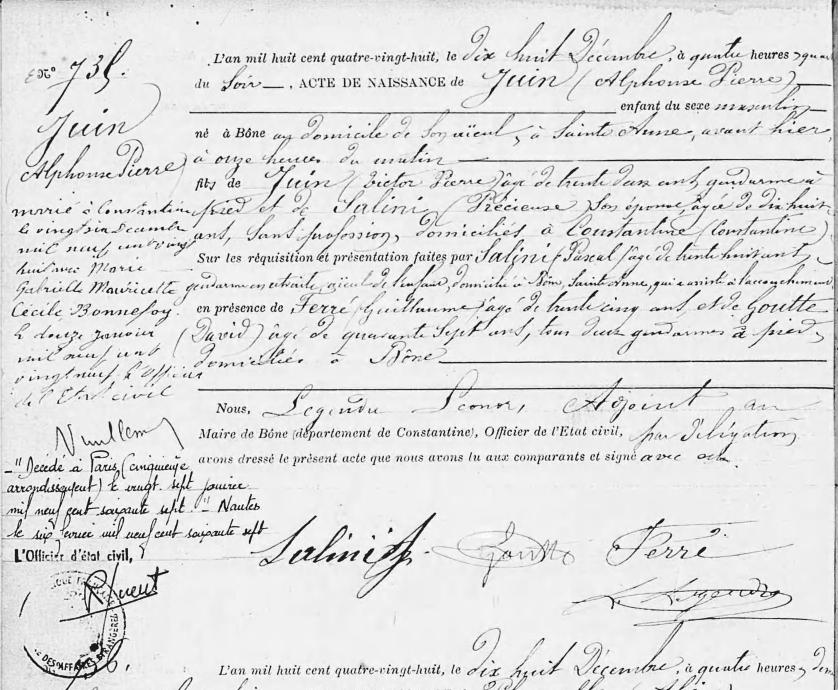
Birth certificate of Alphonse Pierre Juin

Alphonse Juin was born at Bône (now Annaba) in French Algeria on 16 December 1888, the only son of Victor Pierre Juin, a soldier who became a gendarme after 15 years of military service, mostly in Algeria, and his wife Précieuse Salini, the daughter of another soldier who had also become a gendarme. He was named after his paternal grandfather. When he was six, his family moved to Constantine, where he went to primary school, and learnt Arabic from the local boys. In 1902 he was awarded a bursary to study at the Lycée d'Aumale in Constantine.

In 1909 he passed the entrance examination for the École spéciale militaire. At that time cadets were required to spend a year in the Army before commencing the course, so he enlisted in an Algerian regiment, the 1st Zouaves Regiment, quickly rising to corporal and then sergeant. He entered Saint-Cyr in 1910. Classes are named, and his class, the 94th, was known as promotion de Fès after the Moroccan city of Fès that was at the centre of the Agadir Crisis of 1911. Among the class of 223, which included eight foreigners from China, Turkey, Iran and Algeria, were future général d'armée Antoine Béthouart, three future généraux de corps d'armée, four future généraux de division and eighteen future généraux de brigade, including Charles de Gaulle. There would remain a special bond between members of the class, and de Gaulle would always address Juin using the personal pronoun tu. Juin, de Gaulle and Béthouart would give their names to the Saint-Cyr classes of 1966–68, 1970–72 and 2000–03 respectively.

After graduating on 1 October 1912, Juin was commissioned as a sous-lieutenant in an Algerian regiment, the 1st Algerian Tirailleurs Regiment. He soon saw service in Morocco in the Zaian War, participating in the fighting around Taza.

== First World War ==
Upon the outbreak of the First World War in August 1914, a brigade of five battalions known as the Brigade des Chasseurs Indigènes was formed from Moroccan troops and sent to the Western Front in France. Juin joined Chef de Bataillon Joseph-François Poeymirau's 2e Régiment des Chasseurs Indigènes as a lieutenant. On 5 September, the brigade joined the fighting in the First Battle of the Marne. Juin was wounded in his left hand the following day, but refused evacuation to hospital, remaining at the front with his arm in a sling. He was awarded the Cross of the Legion of Honour. The brigade was withdrawn from the line in January 1915, but committed to battle again in March in the First Battle of Champagne. In this battle Juin was again wounded, this time in his upper right arm. The damage was permanent, and he was given permission to henceforth salute with his left.

Juin found Poeymirau, who had also been wounded, in the hospital, and Poeymirau arranged for Juin to be sent back to Morocco in December 1915 to convalesce. Promoted to capitaine, Juin joined Moroccan troops preparing to go to France, but he accepted an offer from Général de division Hubert Lyautey, the Resident-General in Morocco, to become his aide-de-camp for six months. Juin returned to France towards the end of 1916 in command of a company of the 1er Régiment de Tirailleurs Marocains, participating in the Nivelle Offensive in April 1917. He was selected for staff training in February 1918. When he returned in October 1918, he was initially posted to the staff of his division, but then joined the French Mission to the United States Army, where he served when the fighting ended in November 1918.

== Interwar ==
After the war, Juin returned to the 1st Moroccan Tirailleurs Regiment, but was seconded to Lyautey's staff, and then sent to École Supérieure de Guerre for more staff training. After graduating in 1921, he was posted to the headquarters of the division in Tunisia. He turned down an offer of a staff appointment in Paris to serve under Poeymirau in Morocco, but Poeymirau died suddenly in 1924. Lyautey then divided Morocco into two commands. When Juin arrived at the new headquarters in Fès, he found Capitaine Jean de Lattre de Tassigny occupying the position of G-3 (Operations) that Juin had expected. Since Juin was staff trained and de Lattre was not, Juin became G-4 (Logistics) and had as principal task the supplying of the forts in the Ouergha River area. During the Rif War, he served on the staff of Colonel Charles Noguès. For his services leading troops in the field, Juin was made an officer of the Legion of Honour and promoted to Chef de bataillon.

Lyautey was blamed for the French lack of preparedness for the war and relieved of his command. As a marshal, Lyautey was member of the Conseil supérieur de la guerre, and as such was entitled to a small staff of three officers. He asked Juin to be its head, and Juin accepted even though it was a desk job in Paris for an officer with little influence. He refused even to attend the infrequent conseil meetings because of the presence of Marshal Philippe Pétain. Juin was best man at de Lattre's wedding to Simonne Calary de Lamazière in March 1927.

Juin returned to North Africa in September 1927 to assume command of a battalion of the 19th Algerian Tirailleurs Regiment. He married Marie Gabrielle Cécile Bonnefoy, the daughter of an Army veterinary surgeon who had moved to Constantine and become a businessman, in 1928. They had two sons: Pierre and Michel. The following year he became military secretary to Noguès, who was now the director of political affairs in Morocco. An army requirement for officers to complete six months in command of a battalion before they could be promoted made Juin spend six months in command of a battalion of the 1st Zouaves Regiment. He was promoted to lieutenant-colonel in March 1932, returning to his previous post in time for active operations that year. They were successful, and he was posted to the École Supérieure de guerre as an instructor in 1933. Once again he chafed under the prevailing linear defence doctrine, and he returned to North Africa in 1935 to become second in command and then commander of the 3rd Zouaves Regiment. He was promoted to colonel in June 1935.

Noguès became resident-general in Morocco in 1937, with the expectation that he would become commander in chief in North Africa in the event of hostilities with Nazi Germany. If that happened, Noguès wanted Juin for his chief of staff, but since Juin was only a colonel, it was arranged for him to attend a senior officers course at the Centre des hautes études militaires. On graduation, he returned to Algiers, where he was promoted to the rank of général de brigade on 26 December 1938.

== Second World War ==
=== Fall of France ===
After the Second World War broke out in September 1939, Juin helped arrange the despatch of units from the Armée d'Afrique to help defend metropolitan France. On 4 December, he was given command of the 15e Division d'Infantrie Motorisée (15e DIM). After the German attack began on 10 May 1940, the 15e DIM was ordered into Belgium to hold the area around Gembloux. This was held against German attacks on 14 and 15 May, before the defenders were compelled to retreat to Valenciennes. The 15e DIM came under heavy German attack on 24 May, and retreated into the Lille pocket, where it covered the British and French forces fighting in the Battle of Dunkirk. Some units of his division managed to escape to Dunkirk; the remainder fought until their ammunition ran out. Juin surrendered on 29 May.

Juin became a prisoner of war, and was held in Oflag IV-B Koenigstein, a prison camp for officers in Königstein Fortress in Saxony. While in prison he was promoted to Général de division. He was released in June 1941 at the request of Pétain, now the head of the Vichy Government, in exchange for thirty German sailors, as a specialist in North African affairs. He was promoted to Général de corps d'armée on 16 July, and became commander of the troops in Morocco. Admiral François Darlan offered him the post of Minister for War following the death of Général d'armée Charles Huntziger in November 1941, but Juin turned down the offer, saying that he only wished to serve in North Africa. On 20 November, he was promoted to Général de corps d'armée, replacing Maxime Weygand as commander of French land forces in North Africa. In December he led a French mission to Germany that met with Reichsmarschall Hermann Göring to discuss what would happen if the German-Italian Panzerarmee Afrika was driven out of Libya by Operation Crusader. This did not occur, but a dispute over what should be done led to Juin relieving de Lattre of command of the forces in Tunisia, permanently damaging their friendship.

=== North African campaign ===
Operation Torch, the invasion of Algeria and Morocco by British and American forces, came as a complete surprise to Juin, who had not been brought into secret discussions concerning the operation. He was informed of the landings by Robert Daniel Murphy, the American consul-general in Algiers, on the morning of 8 November 1942 as the first waves were heading toward the beaches. Juin had previously told Murphy that his orders were to resist an invasion of North Africa, but he agreed to immediately consult with Darlan, who arrived at Juin's villa within minutes. Darlan, in turn, sent a message to Pétain in Vichy. Murphy was placed under house arrest in Juin's villa, the pro-Allied troops who had surrounded the villa were driven away, and Général de division Charles Mast, who had collaborated with the Allies, was relieved by Général de division Louis Koeltz.

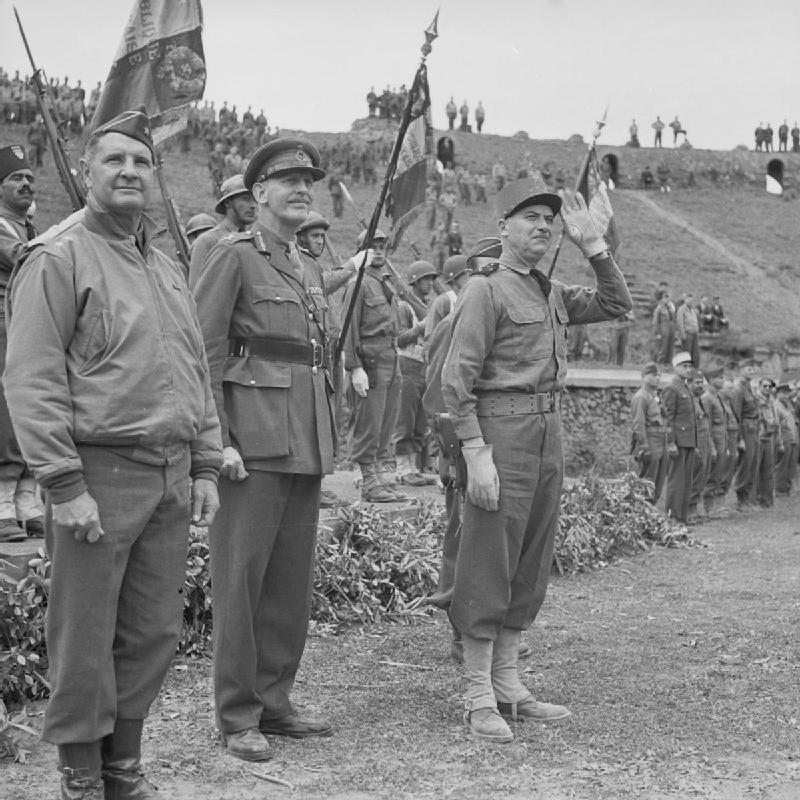
American Major General Geoffrey Keyes (left) with British Major General A. L. Collier (centre), and Juin (right). Note how he salutes with his left arm.

Juin did not want Algeria occupied by the Americans any more than he wished France to be occupied by the Germans, but he recognized the reality of the situation. Darlan authorised Juin to negotiate a local ceasefire in Algiers, so Juin met with American Major General Charles W. Ryder, commander of the U.S. 34th Infantry Division, and the two arranged for an end to the fighting. Algiers was handed over to the Americans, French troops were confined to barracks but retained their weapons, and French police maintained law and order. French resistance to the Allies continued elsewhere in North Africa until Darlan issued a ceasefire on 10 November, and directed Juin to order French forces in Tunisia to resist the Germans and the Italians. Juin's orders were not always obeyed by his subordinates in Tunisia, many of whom believed that Darlan and Juin were being held prisoner by the Americans, but he was able to personally persuade Noguès to work with the Allies.

In the reorganisation of French forces in North Africa on 13 November, Juin became commander of the Eastern Sector. His command, known as the Détachement d'armée Français, held two distinct sectors on the Tunisian front, one in the north under Général de brigade Fernand Barré, and one in the south under Koeltz. His forces were poorly equipped, and when the Germans and Italians counter-attacked, he had to call on the British and Americans for assistance. In January 1943, Juin agreed to a more regular command arrangement, with French forces being concentrated in Koeltz's XIX Corps, which was placed under Lieutenant General Kenneth Anderson's British First Army.

Juin was promoted to Général d'armée. He was given a tumultuous welcome from the populace when he entered Tunis after the Allies captured the city in May. De Gaulle appointed Mast as Resident-General in Tunisia, but Mast was injured in an air crash, and Juin was asked to fill in for him. In this role, Juin joined General Dwight D. Eisenhower, Général d'armée Henri Giraud, Admiral Sir Andrew Cunningham, Air Chief Marshal Sir Arthur Tedder and Lieutenant General Kenneth Anderson on the review stand for the victory parade on 20 May. A less savoury part of the job was informing Muhammad VII al-Munsif, the Bey of Tunisia, that he was being deposed. When Juin was informed that Pétain had stripped the bey of his French nationality and membership in the legion of honour, he merely noted that he was grateful he had not been sentenced to death.

=== Italian campaign ===
General Alphonse Juin with American generals Geoffrey Keyes, Mark W. Clark, Alfred M. Gruenther, and Lucian Truscott, at Rome City Hall on June 5, 1944.

In July 1943, Eisenhower, now the Supreme Allied Commander in the Mediterranean Theater of Operations (MTO), raised the possibility of French troops being used in the upcoming Italian campaign with Juin, who accepted on behalf of Giraud, who was in Washington, D.C. Juin was placed in charge of a force known as Détachement d'armée A, which was intended to eventually grow into an army headquarters. Since it would form part of the U.S. Fifth Army, under the lower-ranking American Lieutenant General Mark W. Clark, Juin styled his command the Corps Expéditionnaire Français (CEF), and took a reduction in rank to Général de corps d'armée. When the first division of the CEF, the 2nd Moroccan Infantry Division (2e DIM), arrived in November 1943, it was initially placed under the command of American Major General John P. Lucas's U.S. VI Corps. In his diary Lucas noted that Juin "turned out to be not only a splendid soldier but a fine and courteous gentleman as well."

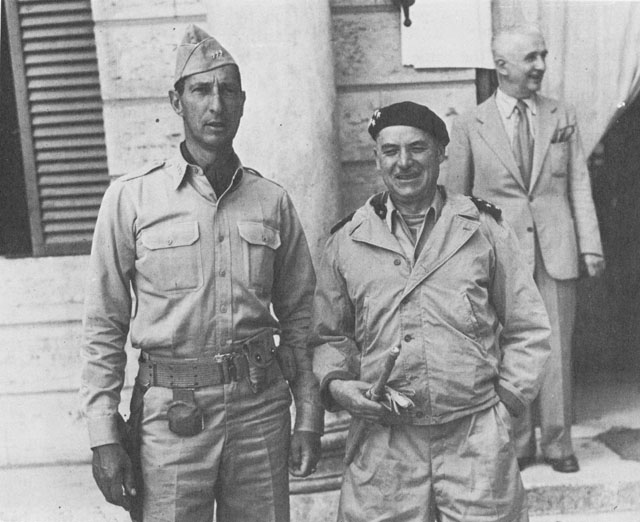
Clark (left) and Juin (right) in Siena, Italy, July 1944.

Juin's CEF relieved Lucas's VI Corps in the line when the CEF's second division, the 3rd Algerian Infantry Division (3e DIA) arrived in December. For the CEF, the First Battle of Monte Cassino began on 12 January 1944, with the CEF advancing four miles to the upper Rapido River and the main defences of the German Gustav Line. After the Allied landings at Anzio on 22 January 1944, he began an attack on Monte Belvedere, about 5 miles (8.0 km) north of Monte Cassino. On 29 January, he reported to Clark that "At the cost of unbelievable efforts and great losses," the 3rd Algerian Infantry Division had "accomplished the mission which you gave them."

After three unsuccessful attempts to break the Gustav Line, British General Sir Harold Alexander, Commander-in-Chief (C-in-C) of the Allied Armies in Italy (AAI, later designated 15th Army Group), decided to make a coordinated attack with both the U.S. Fifth Army and Lieutenant General Sir Oliver Leese's British Eighth Army, codenamed Operation Diadem. As was the British custom, General Alexander gave his subordinates considerable latitude in how they went about implementing his orders. This allowed Juin to put forward a major modification to the plan. He proposed that the CEF, now increased to four divisions, advance through the rugged Aurunci Mountains and outflank the German positions. He was aware of the difficulty of trying to advance, much less exploit a breakthrough over the mountain trails, but felt that the 4th Moroccan Mountain Division and Moroccan Goumiers could do it.

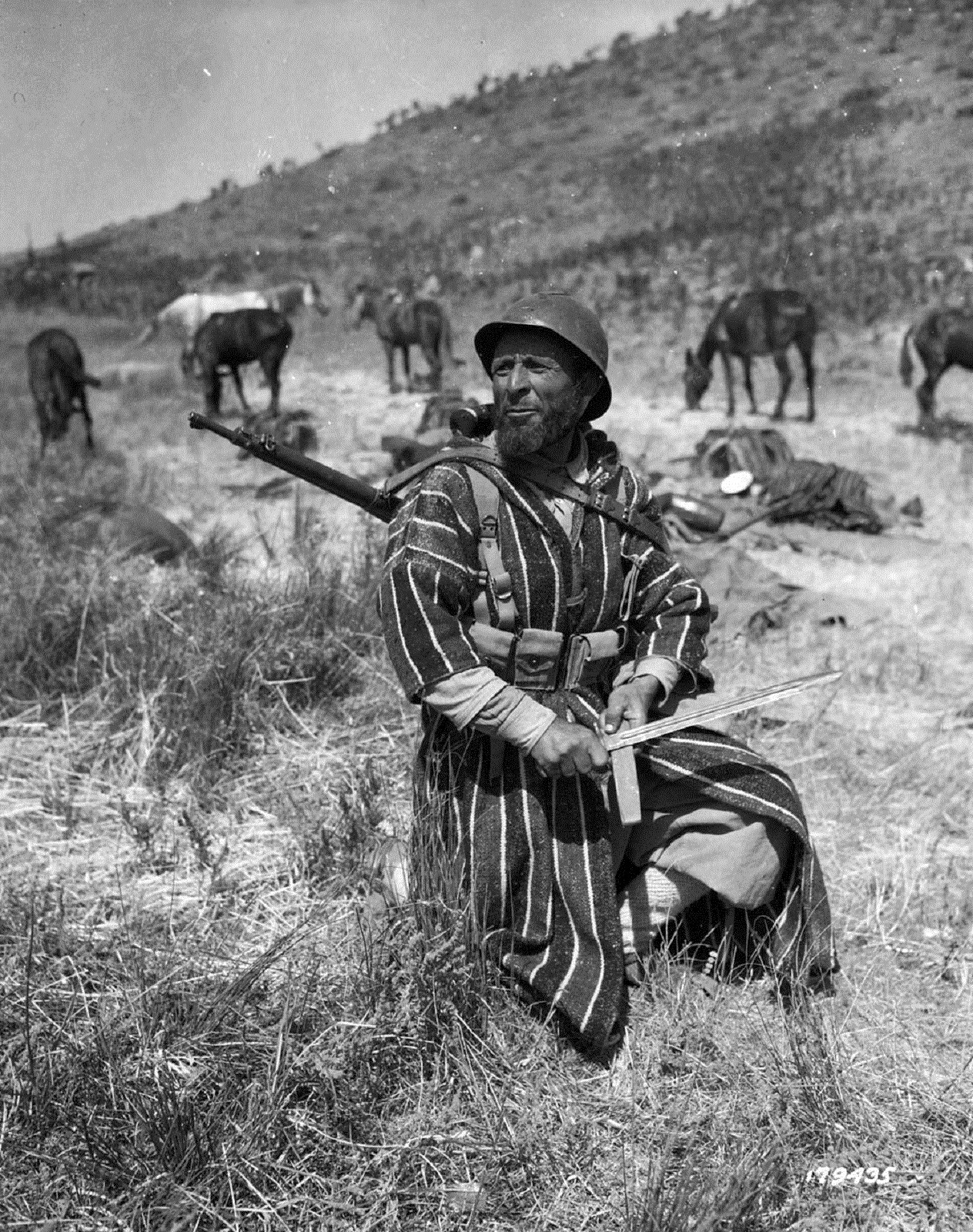
A Moroccan Goumier.

According to Clark:

Meantime, the French forces had crossed the Garigliano (River) and moved forward into the mountainous terrain lying south of the Liri River. It was not easy. As always, the German veterans reacted strongly and there was bitter fighting. The French surprised the enemy and quickly seized key terrain including Mounts Faito Cerasola and high ground near Castelforte. The 1st Motorized Division helped the 2nd Moroccan division take key Mount Girofano and then advanced rapidly north to S. Apollinare and S. Ambrogio. In spite of the stiffening enemy resistance, the 2nd Moroccan Division penetrated the Gustav Line in less than two days' fighting.

The next 48 hours on the French front were decisive. The knife-wielding Goumiers swarmed over the hills, particularly at night, and General Juin's entire force showed an aggressiveness hour after hour that the Germans could not withstand. Cerasola, San Giogrio, Mt. D'Oro, Ausonia and Esperia were seized in one of the most brilliant and daring advances of the war in Italy, and by May 16 the French Expeditionary Corps had thrust forward some ten miles on their left flank to Mount Revole, with the remainder of their front slanting back somewhat to keep contact with the British Eighth Army.

Only the most careful preparations and the utmost determination made this attack possible, but Juin was that kind of a fighter. Mule pack trains, skilled mountain fighters, and men with the strength to make long night marches through treacherous terrain were needed to succeed in the all-but-impregnable mountain ranges. The French displayed that ability during their sensational advance which Lieutenant General Siegfried Westphal, the chief of staff to Kesselring, later described as a major surprise both in timing and in aggressiveness. For this performance, which was to be a key to the success of the entire drive on Rome, I shall always be a grateful admirer of General Juin and his magnificent FEC.

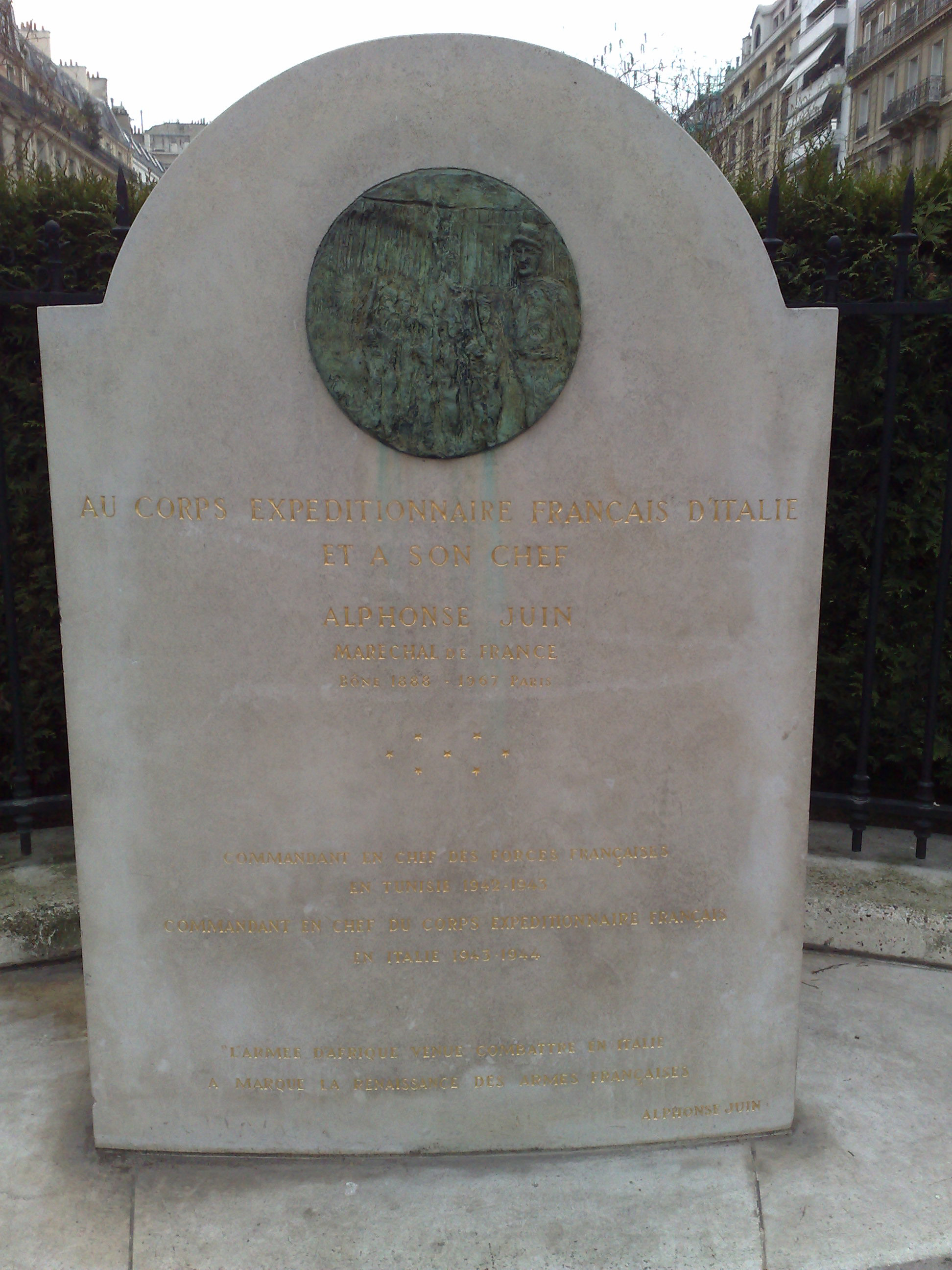
Alphonse Juin Memorial in the Place du Maréchal-Juin in Paris, France.

Clark made a triumphal entry into Rome, with Juin sitting next to him. For Juin, the experience was bittersweet. He felt that the fruits of his victory had been lost through British caution and the American obsession with Rome's capture. The French command rejected his support for continuing the campaign in Italy now that the Allies were winning. On 4 July, the CEF captured Siena, where it celebrated Bastille Day, and then was withdrawn to participate in Operation Dragoon, codename for the Allied invasion of Southern France. In the wake of allegations of raping and pillaging by his North African troops in the Marocchinate, he took steps to curtail the abuses, with drastic measures, including the death penalty, that were not entirely successful owing to the animosity between the French and Italian people over the events of 1940.

=== Chief of Staff ===
Following this assignment Juin was appointed chief of staff of French forces ("Chef d'État-Major de la Défense Nationale"). He helped persuade Eisenhower to allow Philippe Leclerc's 2nd Armoured Division to carry out the liberation of Paris, and he entered the city with de Gaulle on 25 August 1944. He restored order to the liberated areas, suppressing elements of the French Forces of the Interior (FFI) that refused to disband with Spahis that he brought in from North Africa. He arranged with Eisenhower for FFI personnel to be absorbed into four new divisions that guarded the German forces that remained in bypassed garrisons along the Atlantic coast, and the frontier with Italy.

During the German Operation Northwind in January 1945, he clashed with Eisenhower's chief of staff, Lieutenant General Walter B. Smith, over a proposed Allied withdrawal from Alsace and Lorraine. In the event, Eisenhower gave way to political pressure from the British and the French, and the withdrawal was not carried out. Juin also opposed the attack on the Royan pocket in April 1945, but it was carried out anyway over his objections.

== Later life ==
At the time of the end of the war in Europe, Juin was in the United States, where he represented France at the San Francisco Conference. In the immediate post-war period he continued with his task of rebuilding France's armed forces. This was made difficult by the ending of American Lend-Lease aid, and the military commitments to the Allied occupation of Germany, and in North Africa, Syria and Italy, where the 1947 Paris Peace Treaties made some adjustments to the border. The major looming crisis, though, was the Indochina War. Juin lost his direct access to the President when de Gaulle left office in 1946, and his plans for an Army large enough to handle France's commitments had to be scaled back.

In May 1947, Juin returned to Africa as the Resident-General in Morocco. He opposed Moroccan attempts to gain independence and worked uneasily with Mohammed V, the Sultan of Morocco, whom Juin correctly suspected of harbouring nationalist sympathies. Juin forbade religious schools and certain gatherings, which he felt were being taken over by nationalists. Through his 7 March 1949 agreement with Jacques Gershoni of the Jewish Agency, the Zionist organization called Cadima was established to facilitate the migration of Moroccan Jews to the recently established state of Israel. During his tenure Juin instituted many administrative reforms, and greatly expanded opportunities for Moroccans, but it was overshadowed by the growing drift to independence. General Guillaume replaced him in August 1951.

Although Juin visited Indochina in April 1946, and met with Ho Chi Minh, he was not interested in a command there. He likewise turned down an offer in 1948 to command the Western European Union land forces. He returned to Indochina in October 1950, when he was sent to report on the state of France's efforts there. He produced a damning report, in which he criticised both the strategy and tactics being employed. But he again turned down an offer to command the French forces in Indochina, being far more concerned about the situation in North Africa.

On 20 November 1952, Juin was elected at the Seat 4 of the Académie Française.

In 1953 Juin took up a senior NATO position as he assumed command of CENTAG. Once again he served under Eisenhower. He also got along well with Eisenhower's successors, Generals Matthew Ridgway and Alfred Gruenther, whom he had known from the campaign in Italy. During his NATO command, he was made a Marshal of France in May 1952, the only living holder of that rank. After the French defeat in Indochina in the Battle of Dien Bien Phu in 1954, Juin was again asked if he would take over command in Indochina. He was greatly moved by the disaster, in which his former aide was killed, but in the end turned the job down again. He retired on 1 October 1956, coinciding with Gruenther's retirement, as he did not wish to serve under any other American general.

Juin was greatly opposed to de Gaulle's decision to grant independence to Algeria, although he remained steadfastly loyal to de Gaulle. In the wake of the Algiers putsch of 1961 and the Organisation Armée Secrète terrorist campaign, he was placed under house arrest. He was "retired" and his special privileges as a marshal were taken away. In December 1963, he suffered a thrombosis and was hospitalised in the Val-de-Grâce, where he was visited by de Gaulle. Delirious, Juin spoke of "Constantine, Algeria, my country", to which de Gaulle embraced him and replied "Yes, I know, your country is there".

In the event, Juin did not die, but remained frail for the rest of his life. He suffered a heart attack November 1966, and was again taken to the Val-de-Grâce, where he died on 27 January 1967. A funeral was held at Notre Dame de Paris, which was attended by old comrades including Alexander, Ridgway, Béthouart, Marcel Carpentier and de Gaulle, after which Juin was interred in Les Invalides with full military honours.

== Military ranks ==
Private, 2nd class	Corporal	Sergeant	Aspirant	Second lieutenant
7 October 1909	12 February 1910	25 Septembre 1910	15 October 1910	1 October 1911
Lieutenant	Captain	Battalion chief	Lieutenant colonel	Colonel
1 October 1913	4 April 1916	26 June 1926	24 March 1932	24 June 1935
Brigade general	Division general	Corps general	Army general	Marshal of France
26 December 1938	?	20 November 1941	25 December 1942	7 May 1952

== Honours and decorations ==
=== National honours ===
Ribbon bar	Name	Date	Source
	Grand Cross of the National Order of the Legion of Honour	8 May 1945	
	Grand Officer	25 June 1944	
	Commander	1 October 1940	
	Officer	28 December 1924	
	Knight	10 December 1914	

=== Military decorations ===
Ribbon bar	Name	Source
	Military medal	
	War Cross 1914–1918 – One palm, two silver stars, one bronze star	
	War Cross 1939–1945 – Five palms	
	War Cross T.O.E.	
	1914–1918 Inter-Allied Victory medal	
	1914–1918 Commemorative war medal	
	Colonial Medal – Clasp "Maroc" and "Tunisie"	

=== Foreign honours ===
Ribbon bar	Name	Country	Source
	Knight Grand Cross of the Order of the Bath	United Kingdom	
	Grand Cross of the Order of Leopold	Belgium	
	War Cross – One palm	Belgium	
	Chief Commander of the Legion of Merit	United States	
	Distinguished Service Medal	United States	
	Grand Cross of the Order of Malta	Malta	
	Sherifian Order of Military Merit	Morocco	
	Cross of Grunwald – 1st class	Poland	

=== Citations ===
For his promotion to Knight of the National Order of the Legion of Honour:

Officer who stands out everywhere for his courage, his glance and his decision. Wounded by a shrapnel that took away his hand for weeks, he insisted on remaining, despite the suffering he felt, at the head of his section. On 17 September, separated from his battalion by the emptiness caused by a deadly attack, remained in his position despite heavy losses suffered by his troop. Continues to give daily proof of his bravery.

— Journal Officiel de la République Française, 22 January 1915

For his promotion to Commander of the National Order of the Legion of Honour:

General commanding a motorized division, has asserted himself, during the operations of the 1st Army, as a leader and an outstanding maneuver. In Gembloux, from the moment of contact, pushed back a particularly aggressive enemy by inflicting the heaviest losses. During the retreat ordered by the High Command, placed at the extreme protruding of the device, cleared by three times in particularly difficult circumstances. During the final leap that he was to make, hung by the enemy on a flank discovered by the rupture of a large framing unit, locked himself in Lille and offered the enemy a strong resistance to the complete wear and tear of all his ammunition. Made his division, the 15th DMI, a great unit that deserves to be cited as an example for its maneuverability, its tenacity, and the high morale that has always animated it.

— Journal Officiel de l'État français, 2 February 1941

== Bibliography ==
- Le Maghreb en feu, 1957.
- L'Europe en question, 1958, avec Henri Massis.
- Mémoires, 1959–60.
- Je suis soldat, 1960.
- La Campagne d'Italie, 1962
- C'étaient nos frères, 1962.
- Histoire parallèle – La France en Algérie 1830–1962, 1963.
- La Brigade marocaine à la bataille de la Marne, 1964.
- Trois siècles d’obéissance militaire, 1650–1963, 1964.
