= 3rd North African Infantry Division =

French army military formation

The 3rd North African Infantry Division was a French Army formation during World War II.

== History ==
During the Battle of France in May 1940, the division was made up of the following units:

- 12th Zouaves Regiment
- 14th Algerian Tirailleurs Regiment
- 15th Algerian Tirailleurs Regiment
- 93rd Reconnaissance Battalion
- 20th Colonial Artillery Regiments
- 220th Colonial Artillery Regiment.

It was an active division that existed between 1936 and 1940. The Tirailleurs Regiments were made up of native troops from Algeria. The Zouaves Regiment was made up from European settlers in North Africa and some recruited from France.

=== Commanders ===
- 1936 - 1939 : General Théodore Marcel Sciard
- 1939 : General Pierre François Joseph Tarrit
- 1939 : General Édouard Charles François Chapouilly
- 1940 : General Charles Mast
