= Charles Mast =

French soldier (1889–1977)

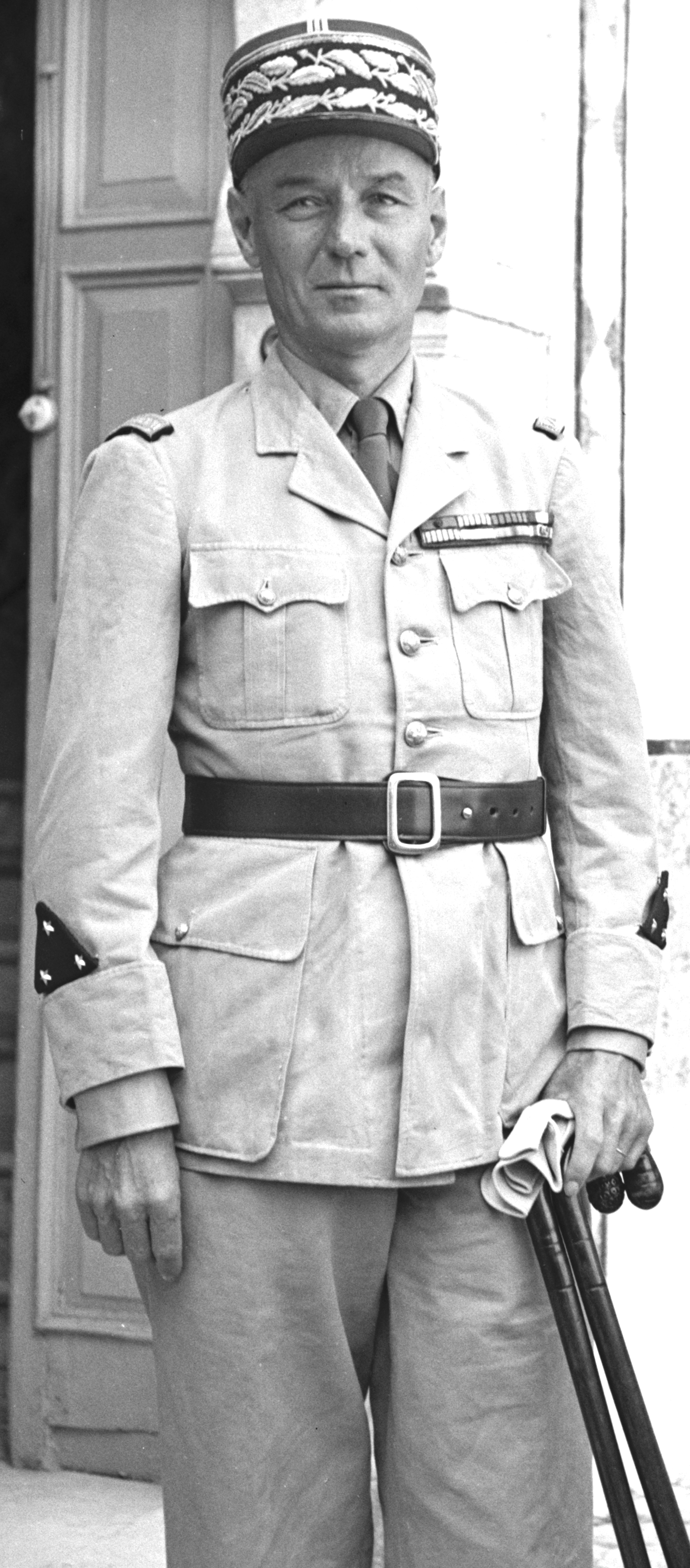
- Born: Emmanuel Charles Mast; 7 January 1889; Paris, France
- Died: 30 September 1977 (aged 88); Clamart, France
- Military career
- Allegiance: French Third Republic
- Branch: French Army
- Service years: –1950
- Rank: Général d'Armée
- Commands: 3rd North African Infantry Division; 10th Army Corps
- Conflicts: World War I World War II
- Awards: Legion of Honour

Emmanuel Charles Mast (7 January 1889 – 30 September 1977) was a major general who participated in the liberation of North Africa in 1942 and was Resident General of France in Tunisia between 1943 and 1947.

== Prewar ==
He was the son of Michel-Edmond Mast, an officer, and Jeanne Gouat, from Brumath, Alsace. Among his ancestors were Protestant pastors from the Rhenish Palatinate or Baden-Wuerttemberg who had sought refuge in France in the seventeenth century, one of them being Andreas Cellarius.

Before World War II, Colonel Mast was the French military attaché in Tokyo in 1937.

== Beginning of World War II ==
Charles Mast was the Chief of Staff of the 10th Army Corps. On 1 June 1940, he was temporarily promoted to Brigadier, then to Brigadier General. Taken prisoner by the Nazis in the same month, he was imprisoned in the Königstein Fortress. On 20 September 1941, while plotting his escape, he learned that he would be liberated.

Mast was then appointed Head of the Algiers Division, then head of the 3rd North African Infantry Division. Suspected of being an opponent of the Vichy regime, he was imprisoned in 1941. His friend, Colonel Numata, Japanese military attache to the Vichy regime, demanded his release and got it. Charles Mast left the prison as Chief of Staff of the 19th Army Corps (France) in North Africa in 1942.

== Allied landings in North Africa ==
General Mast, who commanded the Algiers Division, was prominent in the preparation of the allied forces landings. He was one of the first Vichy commanders to collaborate with the allied forces to prepare for the naval landings. Mast took part in a clandestine meeting in Cherchell, 23 October 1942. This meeting took place not far from Algiers, in the Villa Teyssier. Participants included General Mark Wayne Clark, deputy to General Dwight Eisenhower. Clark met secretly with various military and civilian representatives of the resistance, including Colonel Germain Jousse, Charles Mast, and Bernard Karsenty, Deputy José Aboulker.

General Mark Wayne Clark, considered Charles Mast as spokesman for Henri Giraud and the head of the French armies in North Africa.

Henri Giraud, contacted by an American envoy and Jacques Lemaigre Dubreuil, agreed to participate in the operation. Mast, Chief of Staff of the Army Corps of Algiers, mediated between Giraud and Charles de Gaulle especially for military questions. They were opposed to François Darlan and Alphonse Juin.

Charles Mast took command of the division march in Casablanca in 1942 and was appointed chief of military missions in Syria and Egypt in 1943.

On 10 May 1943, days after the capture of Tunis, General de Gaulle appointed Mast as the Resident General in Tunisia. de Gaulle made this appointment in the attempt to have strong leadership within the protectorate. Moncef Bay had been deposed on grounds of collusion with the Germans.

Charles Mast remained as the resident General until 22 February 1947, when he was replaced by Jean Mons.

== French Indochina ==
General Mast was not initially a supporter of decolonization. General Georges Revers, intended to have him appointed as High Commissioner of French Indochina instead of Léon Pignon.

As of 20 February 1947, Mast was a major general with the rank of army commander and army general appellation. Mast was also director of the Institut des hautes études de défense nationale (IHEDN). In 1947, he became a Grand Officer of the Legion of Honour.

Following scandal in 1950, Mast was placed in the general reserve. During this time he began a modest journalistic career. Mast wrote books such as The Story of a rebellion, 8 November 1942. Mast corresponded with journalists regarding his wartime career in Tunisia. Until his death, Mast had little confidence in France's western allies chances of success against a collaborated Communist attack.

== Family ==
Charles Mast married in 1913 to Suzanne Bigault of Casanove; they had a son, George Mast (1914–1978), Ecole Polytechnique, promoting, 1936.

He divorced and remarried 14 May 1935. His second wife, Marie-Madeleine Leroy, was a very close friend of Antoine de Saint-Exupéry.
