= Jules Cambon =

French diplomat (1845–1935)

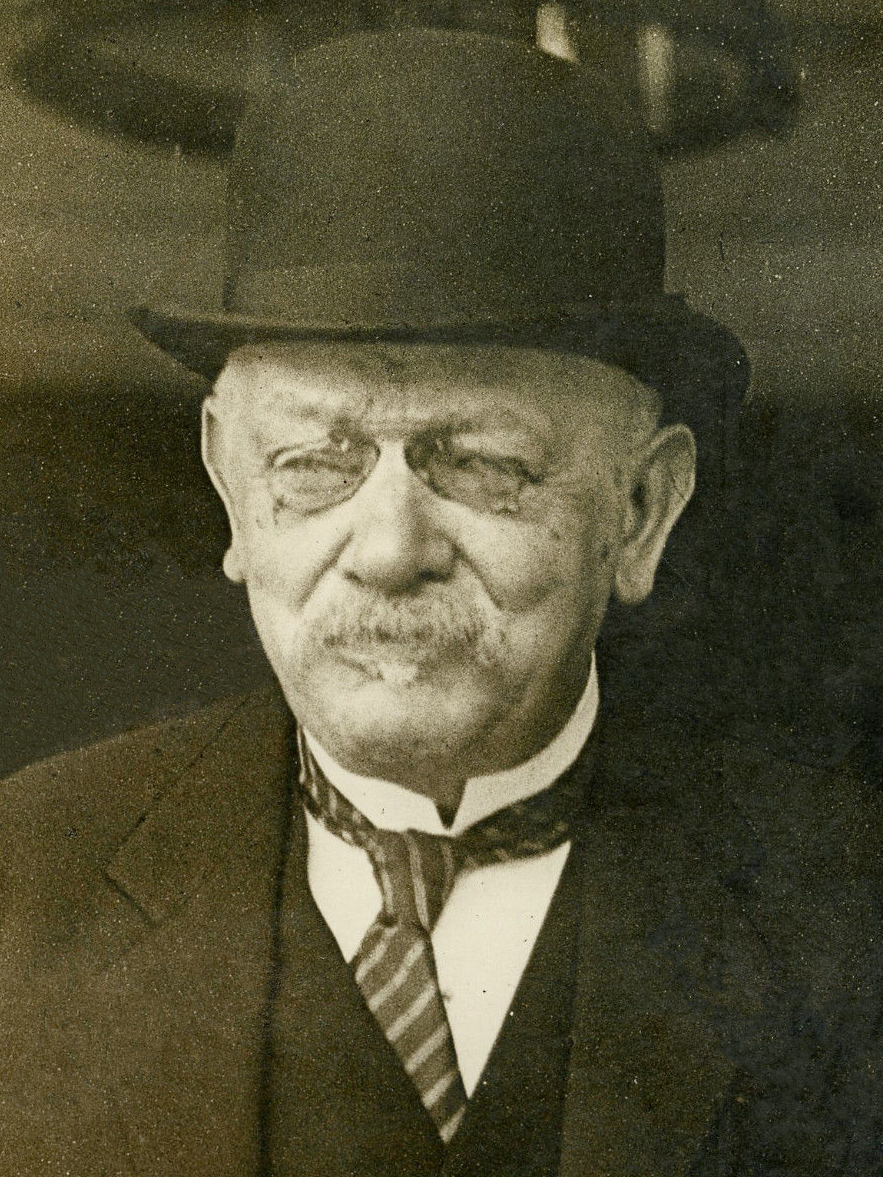
- Born: 5 April 1845; Paris, France
- Died: 19 September 1935 (aged 90); Vevey, Switzerland
- Occupation: Diplomat
- Relatives: Paul Cambon (brother)

Jules-Martin Cambon (5 April 1845 – 19 September 1935) was a French diplomat and brother of Paul Cambon. As the ambassador to Germany (1907–1914), he worked hard to secure a friendly détente. He was frustrated by French leaders such as Raymond Poincaré, who decided that Berlin was trying to weaken the Triple Entente of France, Russia and Britain and was not sincere in seeking peace. The French consensus was that war was inevitable.

== Biography ==
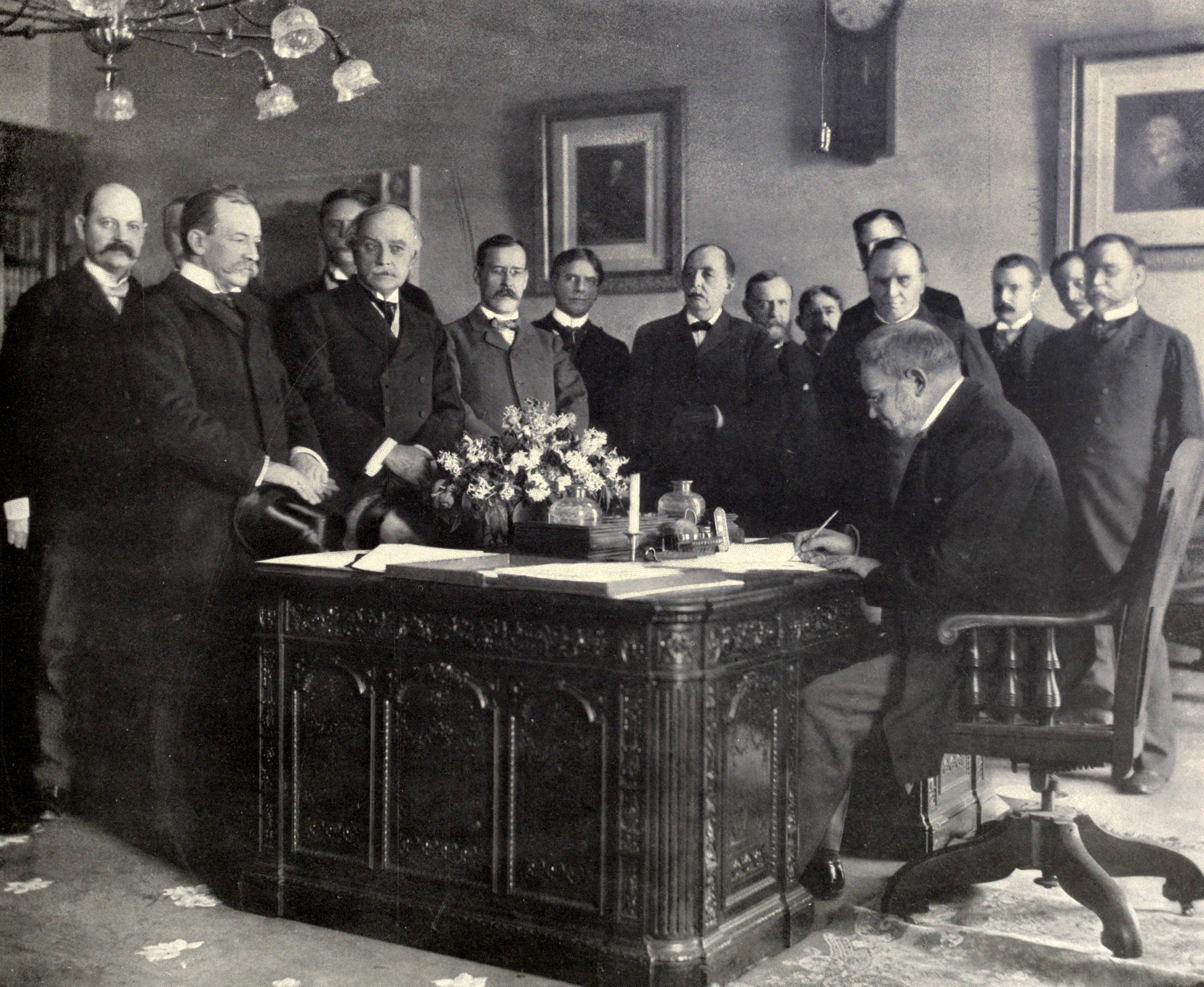
Jules Cambon signs Treaty of Paris (1898)

Cambon began his career as a lawyer in (1866), served in the Franco-Prussian War and entered the civil service in 1871. He was prefect of the department of Nord (1882) and of the Rhône (1887–1891), and in 1891 became governor-general of Algeria, where he had served in a minor position in 1874.

Cambon was nominated French ambassador at Washington, DC, in 1897 and in that capacity negotiated the preliminaries of peace on behalf of the Spanish government after the war against the United States. He was serving as the French ambassador to the United States during the War of 1898. He was an active participant in the peace negotiations between Spain and the United States and a contributor to the final agreement, the Treaty of Paris of 1898. His role in those negotiations helped Spain and France to develop a strong political partnership.

Cambon was transferred in 1902 as ambassador to Spain and in 1907 to Germany, where he served until the outbreak of World War I in 1914, and then as the head of the political section of the French Foreign Ministry during the war. Cambon believed in the Entente Cordiale with Britain and worked to reinforce and strengthen diplomatic ties with France's main ally. Secret negotiations led to the settlement of Palestine after the Allied victory over the Ottoman Empire. Cambon acted as adviser to French Prime Minister Alexandre Ribot as the war draw to a close.

Secrecy surrounded the issue of a Sykes–Picot Agreement, known for many months only to Paris and London. Cambon assisted in the Triple Entente of an Arab–Zionist–Armenian alliance after the fall of the Sultanate had given way to the military regime of the Young Turks. His department shared military and other intelligence with the British Foreign Office in pursuit of the defeat of the Central Powers, Tsarism and Bolshevism.

In 1928, he published what became a classic study of diplomacy, Le Diplomate, which was translated into English, Spanish, German, and Russian, and in it, he wrote, "What really distinguishes the diplomatist from the common herd is his apparent indifference to emotions; he is compelled to carry professional reserve to lengths which seem incomprehensible".

His brother, Paul, was also a notable French diplomat.

== In popular culture ==
In the movie Waiting for Guffman (1996) directed by Christopher Guest, Eugene Levy's character Dr. Allan Pearl plays Ambassador Cambon in the play Red, White and Blaine.

== See also ==
- French entry into World War I

== Sources ==
- Keiger, John (1983). "Jules Cambon and Franco-German Détente, 1907–1914". The Historical Journal. 26 (3): 641–659. doi:10.1017/S0018246X00021099. online
- Jules Cambon, The Diplomatist, trans. Christopher R. Turner. London: Philip Allan, 1931.
