= Louis Malvy =

French politician (1875–1949)

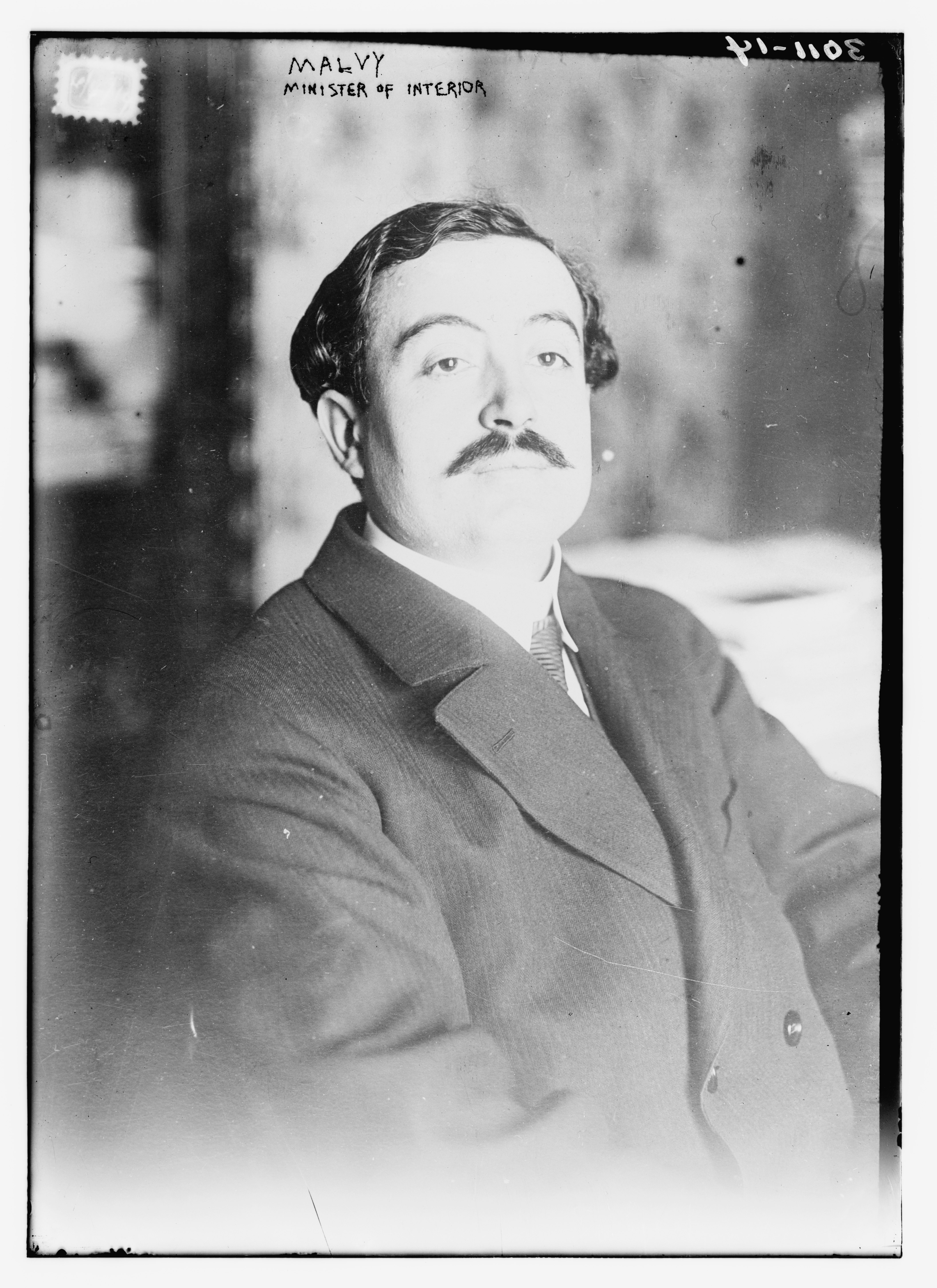
- Malvy in 1914
- Born: 1 December 1875; Figeac, France
- Died: 10 June 1949 (aged 73)
- Occupation: Politician
- Relatives: Marcel Peyrouton (son-in-law)

Louis-Jean Malvy (French pronunciation: [lwi ʒɑ̃ malvi]; 1 December 1875 – 10 June 1949) was the Interior Minister of France in 1914.

== Biography ==
Louis-Jean Malvy was born on 1 December 1875 in Figeac.

== Career ==
Malvy was a member of the Radical Party and served in the Chamber of Deputies as representative of Lot from 1906 to 1919 and from 1924 to 1942. He was sub-secretary of state for Justice from 2–23 June 1911 and sub-secretary of state for the Interior and Religion from 27 June 1911 to 14 January 1912.

Malvy was Minister of Commerce, Industry, Posts and Telegraphs from 9 December 1913 to 16 March 1914, Interior Minister from 17 March 1914 to 31 August 1917 and from 9 March to 15 June 1926. Along with Joseph Caillaux he was charged with treason in 1918 and was exiled for five years.

== Death ==
Malvy died on 10 June 1949 of a heart attack.
