= List of French residents-general in Morocco =

Resident-General of France in Morocco
- Résident général de France au Maroc
- Merchant flag of French Morocco

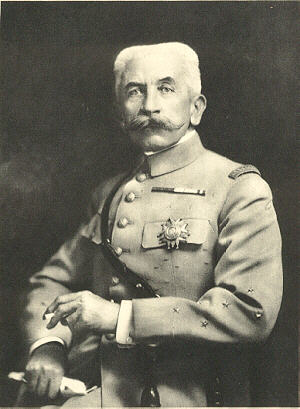
- Longest serving Hubert Lyautey; 28 April 1912 – 25 August 1925
- Reports to: Head of State of France
- Residence: French Protectorate Residence
- Seat: Rabat
- Formation: 28 April 1912
- First holder: Hubert Lyautey
- Final holder: André Louis Dubois
- Abolished: 2 March 1956

French Morocco (light green), 1956.

In 1911, the conquest of Morocco was initiated by the French Third Republic, in the aftermath of the Agadir Crisis. While the conquest itself lasted until 1934, the Treaty of Fes was signed on 30 March 1912. According to the treaty, most of Morocco would become a French protectorate from 1912 to 1956, when the country regained its independence.

== List ==
(Dates in italics indicate de facto continuation of office)

Tenure	Incumbent	Notes	Portrait
4 August 1907 to 28 April 1912	Hubert Lyautey, Military Governor		
28 April 1912 to 25 August 1925	Hubert Lyautey, Resident-General	Marshal of France from 1921	
13 December 1916 to 7 April 1917	Henri Gouraud, Acting Resident-General	For Lyautey	
4 October 1925 to 1 January 1929	Théodore Steeg, Resident-General		
2 January 1929 to 14 September 1933	Lucien Saint, Resident-General		
14 September 1933 to 22 March 1936	Auguste Henri Ponsot, Resident-General		
22 March 1936 to 16 September 1936	Marcel Peyrouton, Resident-General		
16 September 1936 to 21 June 1943	Charles Noguès, Resident-General		
21 June 1943 to 4 March 1946	Gabriel Puaux, Resident-General		
4 March 1946 to 14 May 1947	Eirik Labonne, Resident-General		
14 May 1947 to 28 August 1951	Alphonse Juin, Resident-General		
28 August 1951 to 20 May 1954	Augustin Guillaume, Resident-General		
20 May 1954 to 20 June 1955	Francis Lacoste, Resident-General		
20 June 1955 to 31 August 1955	Gilbert Grandval, Resident-General		
31 August 1955 to 9 November 1955	Pierre Boyer de Latour du Moulin, Resident-General		
9 November 1955 to 2 March 1956	André Louis Dubois, Resident-General		

== See also ==
- Beylik of Tunis
- French protectorate of Tunisia
  - List of French residents-general in Tunisia
- Kingdom of Tunisia
- French Algeria
  - List of French governors of Algeria
- Spanish protectorate in Morocco
  - List of Spanish high commissioners in Morocco

== Sources ==
- http://www.rulers.org/rulm2.html#morocco
- African States and Rulers, John Stewart, McFarland
- Heads of State and Government, 2nd Edition, John V da Graca, MacMillan Press (2000)
