= Paul Cambon =

French diplomat (1843-1924)

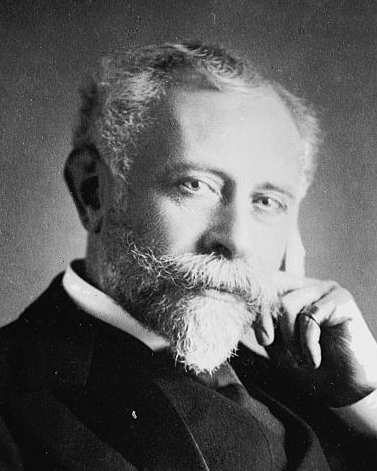

French Ambassador to Madrid
- In office 1890–1920

Personal details
- Born: Pierre Paul Cambon; 20 January 1843 Paris, France
- Died: 29 May 1924 (aged 81) Paris, France
- Relations: Jules Cambon (brother)

Pierre Paul Cambon (French pronunciation: [pjɛʁ pɔl kɑ̃bɔ̃]; 20 January 1843 – 29 May 1924) was a French diplomat and brother of Jules Cambon.

== Biography ==
Cambon was born and died in Paris. He was called to the Parisian bar, and became private secretary to Jules Ferry in the préfecture of the Seine. After ten years of administrative work in France as secretary of préfecture, and then as prefect successively of the départements of Aube (1872), Doubs (1876), and Nord (1877–1882), he exchanged into the diplomatic service, being nominated French minister plenipotentiary in Tunis, fulfilling two terms as Resident-General.

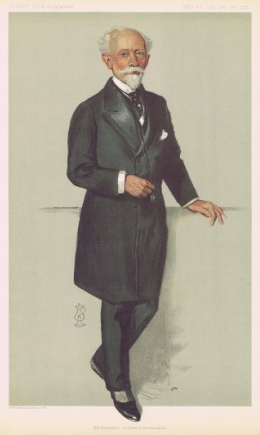
Vanity Fair

In 1886, Cambon became French ambassador to Madrid; was transferred to Constantinople in 1890; and in 1898 to London, where he served until 1920. In London, Cambon quickly became an important figure by helping to negotiate the Entente Cordiale between Britain and France in 1904 and serving as the French representative at the London Conference that resolved the Balkan Wars between 1912 and 1913.

Although Cambon was Ambassador to Britain for more than two decades, he did not speak English and chose not to learn. On the contrary, he insisted that every remark be translated into French, including simple statements such as 'yes'. Christopher Clark notes that Cambon firmly believed "that French was the only language capable of articulating rational thought" and "objected to the foundation of French schools in Britain on the eccentric grounds that French people raised in Britain tended to end up mentally retarded".

Upon the outbreak of the First World War, Cambon helped secure British intervention on the French side. He was also the French signatory to the Sykes-Picot Agreement.

He was decorated with the Grand Cross of the Légion d'honneur and became a member of the French Academy of Sciences. He was an Honorary Knight Grand Cross of the Order of the Bath and an Honorary Knight Grand Cross of the Royal Victorian Order.

In 2014, he was portrayed in the BBC docu-drama miniseries 37 Days by the French actor François-Éric Gendron. The miniseries depicted the behind-closed-doors story of the events that led to the start of the First World War.

== See also ==
- French entry into World War I
