= Resident General of France in Tunisia =

The Resident General of France in Tunisia was the official representative of the French government in Tunis during the French protectorate of Tunisia (1881–1956). The office holder was known as the Minister Resident of France in Tunisia until June 23, 1885 and after September 1, 1955 they were replaced by a High Commissioner.

== Scope of the role ==
The position of Minister-Resident General of France in Tunisia stems from the Treaty of Bardo signed on May 12, 1881, article 5 of which stated that "the government of the French Republic will be represented, with His Highness the Bey of Tunis, by a Minister-Resident General who will ensure the execution of this act and who will be the intermediary for the relations of the French government with the Tunisian authorities for all common affairs of the two countries". Furthermore, article 6 of the same treaty specified that "His Highness the Bey undertakes not to conclude any act of an international nature without having informed the French government of it and without its prior agreement ". Sadok Bey gave effect to this by the decree of June 9, 1881, appointing the resident minister who acted as his Minister of Foreign Affairs.

In addition to this key role, the French Residents General had broad administrative and financial responsibilities under the first article of the conventions of La Marsa (1883) which stated: "In order to facilitate the accomplishment of the protectorate by the French government, His Highness the Bey of Tunis undertakes to carry out the administrative, judicial and financial reforms that the French government deems useful."

In the early days of the protectorate, opposition to the Resident General's reforms did not come from the Tunisian government but from the French military power represented by General Boulanger who commanded the occupying troops in Tunisia. Convinced that the civil power must yield before the military power, he refused to obey the instructions of the Resident Minister Paul Cambon. Faced with this opposition, Cambon requested the support of the French government and clarification about his mission. He obtained satisfaction by a presidential decree of June 23, 1885 which affirmed his primacy. Cambon accordingly pursued his planned reforms and chaired the council of ministers.

== Transition to self-government ==
After this the Bey no longer had any power other than to sign the decrees proposed to him. It was not until 1951 that the presidency of the council of ministers was entrusted to the grand vizier Mohamed Chenik instead of the Resident General, who nevertheless retained the power to veto the decrees of the Tunisian government.

The reforms of the March 2, 1954 further reduced his power since his assent to government decrees was no longer necessary. However he did still need to countersign Beylical decrees, which ensured he retained a significant amount of power.

Internal autonomy was finally granted to Tunisia under the conventions of the June 3, 1955 and accordingly the Resident General was replaced with the “High Commissioner of France in Tunisia” who served as the intermediary of the French government with the Tunisian authorities for the affairs common to the two countries and was responsible for the protection and representation of the rights and interests of French nationals in Tunisia.

With independence on March 20 1956, the High Commissioner was in turn replaced by the French ambassador to Tunisia.

== List of Residents General ==
Name	Portrait	Nominated	Left office
Ministers Resident of France in Tunisia
Théodore Roustan	Théodore Roustan	13 May 1881	28 February 1882
Paul Cambon	Paul Cambon	28 February 1882	28 October 1886
Residents General of France in Tunisia
Justin Massicault	Justin Massicault	23 November 1886	5 November 1892
fr:Charles Rouvier	Charles Rouvier	5 November 1892	14 November 1894
René Millet		14 November 1894	15 November 1900
Georges Benoit		15 November 1900	27 December 1901
Stephen Pichon	Stephen Pichon	27 December 1901	29 December 1906
Gabriel Alapetite	Gabriel Alapetite	29 December 1906	26 October 1918
Étienne Flandin	Étienne Flandin	26 October 1918	1 January 1921
Lucien Saint	Lucien Saint	1 January 1921	2 January 1929
fr:François Manceron	François Manceron	18 February 1929	29 July 1933
Marcel Peyrouton	Marcel Peyrouton	29 July 1933	21 March 1936
fr:Armand Guillon	Armand Guillon	17 April 1936	18 October 1938
fr:Eirik Labonne		22 November 1938	3 June 1940
Marcel Peyrouton	Marcel Peyrouton	3 June 1940	18 July 1940
Jean-Pierre Esteva	Jean-Pierre Esteva	26 July 1940	10 May 1943
Charles Mast	Charles Mast et sa femme en Tunisie	10 May 1943	22 February 1947
fr:Jean Mons		22 February 1947	13 June 1950
fr:Louis Périllier		13 June 1950	13 January 1952
fr:Jean de Hauteclocque		13 January 1952	2 September 1953
Pierre Voizard	Pierre Voizard	2 September 1953	5 November 1954
fr:Pierre Boyer de Latour du Moulin	Pierre Boyer de Latour du Moulin	5 November 1954	31 August 1955
High Commissioner of France in Tunisia
Roger Seydoux		13 September 1955	20 March 1956

== See also ==
- List of French residents-general in Morocco
- List of beys of Tunis
- Tunisian national movement
