= Justin Massicault =

French journalist and government official

Justin Théophile Athanase Massicault (September 14, 1838 – November 5, 1892) was a French journalist and government official.

Born in Ourouer-les-Bourdelins (Cher), Massicault was the child of two teachers and was at first a teacher himself, but then became a journalist at the daily Le Progrès in Lyon. In 1862 he joined the staff of La Gironde, a Bordeaux daily, where he eventually became editor.

Appointed prefect of the Haute-Vienne on October 25 of 1870, he resigned on February 6, 1871. He later founded several newspapers successively: L'Indépendance in Bordeaux, La Charente in Angouleme, and La Vienne in Poitiers.

He was appointed Prefect of the Rhône in 1882, and as resident-general in Tunisia on November 22 of 1886 till his death at Tunis on November 5 of 1892.

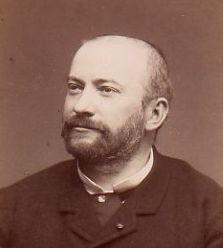
Portrait of Justin Massicault, was a French journalist.
