= Jean-Pierre Esteva =

French politician (1880–1951)

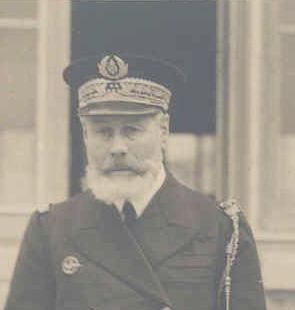
- Born: 14 September 1880; Reims, France
- Died: 11 January 1951 (aged 70); Reims, France
- Military career
- Allegiance: France
- Branch: French Navy
- Rank: Amiral

Jean-Pierre Esteva (14 September 1880 – 11 January 1951) was a French naval officer who served in the First and Second World Wars. From 1940 to 1943, he served as Resident-General in Tunisia for the Vichy French government.

== Naval career ==
Esteva entered the École Navale (Naval School) in 1898 from which he left a ship's teach in 1900.

As a Lieutenant, he participated in the First World War. Assigned to the Mediterranean squadron, he took part, among other operations, in the Battle of the Dardanelles on the occasion of which he particularly distinguished himself.

In 1920, he was a professor at the École supérieure de la Marine in Toulon, in 1927, captain, Esteva decided to follow a pioneering path in the nascent naval aviation, an original choice for an officer of this rank. Promoted Rear Admiral in 1929, he was Director of Maritime Aviation, then Deputy Chief of the Air Staff in 1930 before becoming Vice Admiral in 1935. He left for the Far East where he was commander-in-chief of the naval forces. He commanded several naval units where he hoisted his flag aboard the light cruiser Lamotte-Picquet. His stay in the Pacific led him to regularly visit the British bases of Hong Kong and Singapore as well as to fully appreciate the rise in power of the Imperial Japanese Navy. On his return to Metropolitan France, his versatility and his skills made him the ideal to occupy the function of inspector of the maritime forces. Subsequently, in 1939, he took command of the French naval forces in the South.

=== Vichy ===
After the armistice of June 1940, Esteva, like many other admirals including François Darlan, chose to serve the Vichy regime. A trusted man of Marshal Pétain, he left for French North Africa. On 26 July 1940, he became Resident General of France in Tunisia. In this position, he succeeded Marcel Peyrouton, who had been appointed to ministerial functions in Vichy. In November 1942, when the Allies launched Operation Torch, Esteva was still stationed there. In response, he procrastinated, and ended by collaboration with the Axis. On 9 November 1942, he condemned the arrival of Luftwaffe aircraft at El Aouina airfield. But very quickly, out of loyalty to Pétain and under pressure from Pierre Laval, Esteva changed position. He allowed the Germans to take over several French bases in Tunisia, with intact fuel stocks. In the process, he neutralized Admiral Derrien, who had encouraged his troops to fight against the Axis.

In May 1943, as Allied troops occupied Tunisia, Esteva was repatriated to France by the Germans. The admiral was evacuated on 7 May by plane and at the same time as the consul general of the Third Reich in Tunisia. In Paris, he was taken to the Ritz (then partly occupied by the Luftwaffe) in order to be put there under house arrest while waiting for the German authorities to rule on his fate. Locked in his room, he was guarded by German sentries. Finally released on 18 May, he arrived at Vichy where he was warmly welcomed and congratulated by Pétain for his loyalty to the orders received. German Foreign Minister Joachim von Ribbentrop sent him a message of sympathy and thanked him for having "facilitated the conduct of the war by the Axis powers". Esteva said at his trial before the high court: "This letter doesn't interest me. I am a French civil servant. I had nothing to do with von Ribbentrop."

In North Africa, however, a War Council, chaired by General Henri Giraud, on 15 May sentenced Esteva to the death penalty in absentia.

=== Arrest and trial ===
On 22 September 1944, he was arrested by French police in Paris and then imprisoned in Clairvaux Prison. A new trial is organised, in which he was accused of delivering wheat to the Italian army in Libya, granting facilities to Axis troops to establish themselves on the coast and Tunisian airfields after the Allied landing in 1942, recruiting workers and combatants in a Phalanx African in the service of Germany, manifesting on several occasions his sympathy for the German cause. He was found guilty of treason on 15 March 1945. Militarily degraded by the High Court of Justice, he was sentenced to forced labor for life.

Esteva was pardoned on 11 August 1950. He died a few months later and was interred in Reims.

== Bibliography ==
- Halpern, Paul G., ed. (2016). The Mediterranean Fleet, 1930–1939. Publications of the Navy Records Society. Vol. 163. London: Routledge for the Navy Records Society. ISBN 978-1-4724-7597-8.
- Taillemite, Etienne (1982). Dictionnaire des marins français. Paris: Editions maritimes et d'Outre-Mer. OCLC 470113586.
- Roger Maudhuy, Les grands procès de la Collaboration, Saint-Paul (Haute-Vienne), L. Souny, 2009.
- Serge La Barbera, Les Français de Tunisie – 1930–1950 (troisième partie sur le régime de Vichy), L'Harmattan, 2006, p. 405 ISBN 229601075X.
- André Figueras, Onze amiraux dans l'ouragan de l'histoire, Paris, André Figueras, 1991.
- Georges London, L'Amiral Esteva et le général Dentz devant la Haute Cour de Justice, Lyon, R. Bonnefon, 1945.
