= Théodore Roustan =

French colonial administrator (1833–1906)

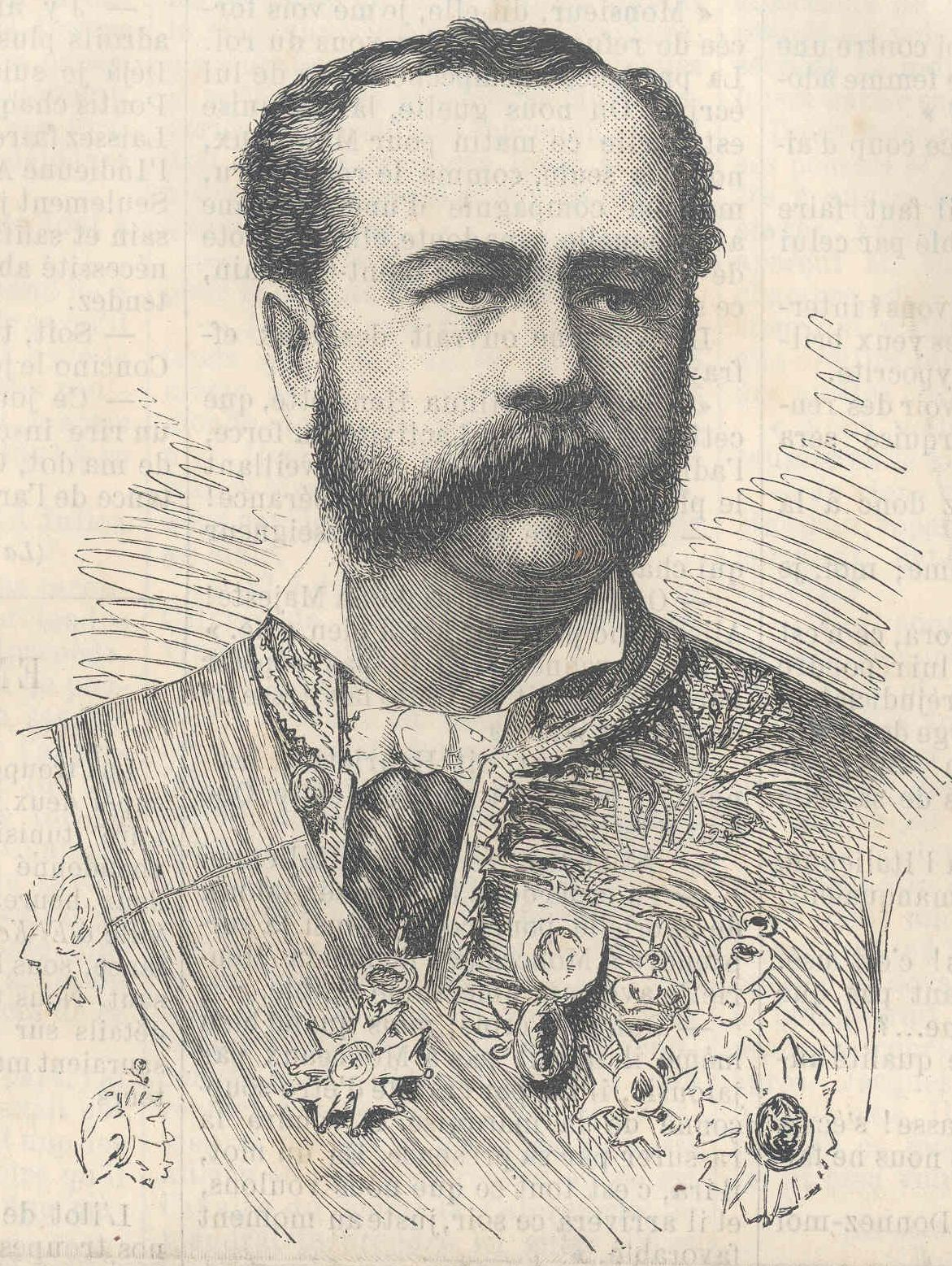
Théodore Roustan in 1881

Théodore Roustan, complete name Justin Théodore Dominique Roustan, (8 August 1833 – 8 August 1906) was a diplomat and official of the French colonial empire.

== Debut in the diplomatic career ==
Born in Nîmes, in an academic environment, Roustan prepared a licenciate in law at Aix-en-Provence, then choose a diplomatic career. A student consul since 1860, he was successively appointed to Beirut and then İzmir, before being transferred in March 1865 to Cairo, where he was entrusted with the management of the consulate before being appointed in August of that same year. He then returned to Paris as attaché to the direction of the consulates in December 1866 and was appointed consul in Alexandria in June 1867 and in Damascus in March 1868. Commissioner in Palestine in August 1870, at the time of the interreligious conflicts, he returned as consul of Alexandria in June 1872 after being placed on leave during the events of September 1870. General consul in Beirut in December 1872, he was promoted to the rank of general consul and chargé d'affaires in Tunis on 17 December 1874.

== Post in Tunisia ==
=== Context ===
The Tunis Regency which he discovered was in the midst of a period of reform since the appointment of the Grand vizier of Tunis Hayreddin Pasha on 22 October 1873. But the task ahead for Roustan was enormous: the English took advantage of France's weakening following the defeat in the 1870 Franco-Prussian War to obtain numerous concessions from the reigning monarch, Sadok Bey. On 23 August 1871, they were authorized to build a railway line between Tunis and Le Bardo, the future TGM. The contract even granted the authorization to operate for 99 years the land crossed by the line, inaugurated on 2 August 1872. This was an opportunity for the British consul, Richard Wood, to push his advantage by obtaining an extension of the line from La Goulette to La Marsa as well as the concessions of the Tunis – Hammam Lif, Tunis – Béja and Tunis – Le Kef lines. These were not the only contracts won by the English companies: the distribution of town gas was also granted to the "Foreign and Colonial Gas Company" for a period of fifty years. An English bank, "The London Bank of Tunis", was authorized on 19 May 1873 to issue banknotes despite protests from all foreign consuls.

All these concessions had been obtained thanks to the benevolence of the former Grand vizier, Mustapha Khaznadar. His fall gave the French government hope of a turnaround in favour of French interests, but the French consul in Tunis, the Viscount of Billing, came into conflict with Kheireddine to the point of considering his murder. Faced with such incompetence, he was urgently called back to Paris and replaced by Roustan, who had the difficult task of making people forget this whole series of failures.

=== Struggle for economic influence ===
The Grand vizier found in the new consul the support he needed to carry out his reforms. The International Finance Commission, which managed the regency's tax revenues, was headed by a French financial inspector, Victor Villet and then Édouard Le Blant. They appreciated the Tunisian government's desire to consolidate its finances and lent it their full assistance with the support of Roustan, who thus succeeded in reducing the influence of the British consul.

The loss of Richard Wood's support was felt even in the economic performance of the English companies benefiting from the concessions at the beginning of the decade. The gas company went bankrupt in 1875. The English bank closed its counters in July 1876. The TGM was on the verge of bankruptcy to the point that its owners were trying to get rid of a line "without traffic, without passengers and without goods". We no longer even think about building the railway to Beja or Le Kef.

Roustan immediately pushed his advantage by persuading Kheireddine to transfer the Beja line concession to a French company. This was done on 7 May 1877 after the French government had granted its guarantee to the Compagnie des chemins de fer Bône-Guelma responsible for the works and created specially for the occasion. The French consul was aware that this concession was the first step towards a future railway linking Tunisia to French-dominated Algeria. But Kheireddine was no fool: the concession stopped forty kilometres from the Algeria-Tunisia border and he strongly rejected all French requests for an extension to their neighbouring colony.

Kheireddine's desire to foster a rapprochement between Tunisia and the Ottoman Empire persuaded Roustan that the Grand vizier was an obstacle to the French predominance that he was trying to impose in the country. He therefore ceased to support him against his many enemies, which hastened his disgrace and dismissal on 22 July 1877.

The new Grand vizier, Mustapha Ben Ismaïl, weak of character, quickly became a puppet in the hands of the French consul. The connection of the railway on Algerian lines was authorized on 28 January 1878. A declaration of independence from Constantinople was being considered. The English and Italian consuls noted with bitterness their total erasure. Even Kheireddine testified that "the French consul becomes all-powerful in Tunisia [...] and thus sees his wishes come true beyond his expectations".

=== Preparation of the protectorate ===
==== Congress of Berlin ====
The Congress of Berlin which took place from 13 June to 13 July 1878, completely changed Roustan's mission. After always opposing the ambitions of the French, the United Kingdom now accepted their control over Tunisia. Upon his return from the conference, the French Minister of Foreign Affairs, William Henry Waddington, asked the consul to prepare a draft of a "friendly" protectorate to be presented to the Bey of Tunis. He did so but expressed his doubts about Sadok Bey's acceptance and warned that only a military demonstration could force him to sign. Waddington eventually abandoned his project, aware that the French were thinking only of a revenge on the German Empire and not of a distant conquest which, moreover, would anger the country with Italy, animated by neighbouring ambitions. But this episode convinced Roustan that he had the opportunity to enter history by creating favourable conditions for a future occupation of the regency. From that date onwards, he endeavoured to increase all cases in which the French were involved in order to convince French public opinion that such attacks on the country's honour deserved compensation.

==== The Sidi Thabet case ====
Ferdinand Veillet-Devaux, so-called Count of Sancy, had obtained in 1866 a 1,200 hectare concession in Sidi Thabet to build a stud farm. In 1873, victim of financial difficulties, he accused the Tunisian government of being responsible and claimed enormous compensation. Faced with the refusal of the French consul then in Tunis, Viscount Charles Vallat, to support his abusive claims, he appealed to his brother-in-law, général du Barail, then minister of War. Faced with such pressure, Kheireddine gave in and signed a new concession with De Sancy on 9 July 1877, granting him 3,000 hectares, on condition that he build a stud farm within a year. But, due to a lack of capital, he was unable to meet this last condition, which justified the Tunisian government taking possession of the property.

On 10 December 1878, a commission led by general Baccouche, Director of Foreign Affairs, and including the President of the Municipality of Tunis, Mohamed Larbi Zarrouk, the Inspector of Finance, Eugène Queillé, the Vice-President of the Finance Commission and the Secretary of the Commission, David Santillana, appeared at the estate for the seizure. They found a Janissary from the French consulate who forbade them to enter this "French land". Roustan immediately screamed at the violation of his home. An ultimatum was sent to the bey, demanding an apology and dismissal of all Tunisian officials involved. Queillé was called back to Paris, Santillana resigned and left the country.

Faced with demands that were known to be unacceptable, the French government was preparing for the breakdown of diplomatic relations, which would justify military intervention and the establishment of the protectorate. But to the general disappointment, Sadok Bey gave in. On 10 January 1879 the Grand vizier moved in full uniform to the French consulate to apologize for the Tunisian government. A Franco-Tunisian commission was set up to consider De Sancy's demands sympathetically. The only winner of this arm wrestling match, he quickly sold his estate in May 1880 to the Société Marseillaise de Crédit.

==== Confrontation with Italy ====
===== Arrival of a new consul =====
Faced with Sadok Bey's obstinacy to defend the regency's independence, Roustan convinced Mustapha Ben Ismaïl to use the monarch's weaknesses against him to get him to sign the protectorate treaty. But it was a failure as he testified to Felix Desprez: "Mustapha remembers the anger of the bey who went without speaking to him last year for three days because he had advised His Highness to sign the treaty. It seems that three days, given the intimacy of the bey and his minister, is something huge."

Failing to achieve his goals with the Tunisian monarch, Roustan recorded a small satisfaction when he finally obtained, on 31 March 1879, the recall of the English consul, Richard Wood, who had never stopped opposing his manoeuvres. His successor, Thomas Reade, would be much more conciliatory with French ambitions.

His main opponent, the French consul, who had been dismissed, was now facing attacks from the new Italian consul in Tunis, Licurgo Macciò, who had been in office since 20 December 1878. Well determined to block French claims, the latter systematically contested all requests for concessions in favour of the French by making counter-proposals in favour of Italian companies. He soon gathered around him all the opponents of the French consul, but the latter nevertheless retained the advantage thanks to all the spies he maintained in the bey's entourage. The sale of the TGM forced the two opponents to oppose each other head-on.

===== The TGM case =====
For four years, the managers of the Tunisian Railway Company, owners of the line, had been trying to get rid of this largely loss-making company. They were about to do so when they signed a preliminary contract with the Société de navigation génoise Rubattino for 225,0000 francs on 22 March 1880. As soon as he was informed, Roustan informed the managers of the Bône-Guelma company, who outbid and took the contract for the sum of 262,5000 francs, i.e. more than twice the real value of "this old scrap metal". But the contract was broken by the High Court of Justice of London. An auction was then organised, won by the Italians for the sum of 413.7500 francs for a line that was only worth 100.0000 four years earlier.

This French defeat worried the French government, which took a negative view of Italian competition in what is considered a French preserve. Roustan was then encouraged to accelerate the economic penetration of French companies by asking for the concession of a port at Radès and a railway line connecting it to Tunis. In response to the Bey's hesitations, three warships were sent to Tunisian waters and a corps of 3,000 men was assembled at the Algerian border. Sadok Bey ceded and the company Bône-Guelma obtained a monopoly on the construction of the railways and the concession for the construction of a port in Tunis itself was granted. Roustan could triumph; the failure of the TGM had lost all its importance and nothing stood in the way of France's economic control over the regency. However, the Enfida case reminded the French that everything could be quickly called into question.

==== The Enfida Case ====
The Enfida estate, covering 100,000 hectares, had been offered by Sadok Bey to Kheireddine in gratitude for his work. When he left Tunisia, no Tunisian buyer being interested, he sold the property to the Société Marseillaise de Crédit, which had already acquired the estate of Sidi Thabet. But this sale was not to the taste of the monarch who considered that he had not offered this estate for it to end up in foreign hands. His great vizier shared his opinion because he intended to reclaim the land for himself without a free purse. His disappointment led him to move away from Roustan, which he had always supported in his companies. All new concession applications were now refused and old ones questioned. It was clear that Mustapha Ben Ismaïl had now joined the Italian camp. After years of rejecting it, the military option was once again being considered by some French ministers.

===== Preparation for the invasion =====
The invasion of the regency by French troops from Algeria had always been considered by Roustan. To this end, he bribed the Tunis consul in Annaba, Joseph Allegro, who informed him about everything that was happening in the border region to the point of boasting that he could annex this part of the country as soon as he was asked. A whole spy network was also set up by Bernard Roy, the consular agent at Le Kef.

There were many border incidents caused by looting tribes. Conferences were then organized at the border between Tunisian and French representatives of Algeria to agree on reparations, as in 1875 and 1880. The French military appreciated the constructive attitude of the Tunisian authorities in these discussions. Yet, Roustan had an opposing view on the issue. As soon as the Sidi El Hamici conference ended in March 1880, he complained that these discussions resulted in financial compensation without the authors being punished. In addition, he considered that forest fires should also be included in claims for compensation. The French government finally agreed with his point of view and new claims for compensation were made in February 1881, less than a year after the last conference. They serve to justify to the French deputies the necessity of intervention in Tunisia to protect the Algerian colony.

=== Protectorate establishment ===
==== Military conquest ====
The entry of French troops into Tunisia on 24 April 1881 was the consecration of Roustan's work over the years. The information gathered by Allegro and Roy facilitated the military conquest. As for the Treaty of Bardo, it took up most of the points he had written in his first draft of 1878. He was therefore one of the four signatories. His efforts were rewarded by his appointment as Minister Plenipotentiary of First Class and Minister Resident in Tunis under Article 5 of the Treaty.

Even the uprising of many Tunisian tribes between July and December 1881 did not call into question his position. On the contrary, his links with Sadok Bey were highly appreciated since he succeeded in convincing the monarch to accede to French requests to involve the Tunisian Beylical Army in the repression of the insurrection. This made his fall all the more unexpected.

==== Trial of L'Intransigeant ====
From the beginning of the campaign, the newspaper L'Intransigeant and its director launched a campaign against the operations, writing on 25 April 1881: "To what idiot will the ministry make believe that we are going to spend millions and immobilize in Tunisia forty thousand men for the sole purpose of punishing three Kroumirs who, from time to time, had stolen a 90 franc cow from our colonists?". In September, the newspaper tried to demonstrate that the purpose of the conquest was purely financial, to the benefit of speculators on the Tunisian debt. The government then encouraged Roustan to sue Rochefort for defamation. On 15 December, he was acquitted by the jury of the Seine. Discredited by this verdict which sounded like a conviction, Roustan understood that his days in Tunis were numbered. The French government was also aware that it took a new man to set up the administration of the protectorate without old personal resentments blocking the work to be done.

== After Tunisia ==
On 18 February 1882, Roustan left Tunis for Washington, where he was appointed ambassador. During his mission, he directed the work of the arbitration commission between Colombia and Costa Rica. On 5 August 1891, he was appointed French Ambassador in Madrid.

He retired on 19 April 1894 and died in Paris on 8 August 1906 at the age of 73 before being buried in the family vault at Ceyreste.

== Distinctions ==
Roustan was promoted to officer of the Legion of Honour on 11 November 1875, elevated to the rank of commander on 31 July 1879 before finally becoming grand officier of the Legion of Honour on 12 May 1894.

== Private life ==
Roustan married Eugénie Roussi in 1867 but she died three years later, on 5 June 1870, at the age of 31. He never married again. In 1880, his liaison with the wife of the Tunisian government's Deputy Director of Foreign Affairs, Elias Mussalli, was extensively commented in the context of accusations of prevarication.
