= Charles Noguès =

French general

Auguste Paul Charles Albert Noguès
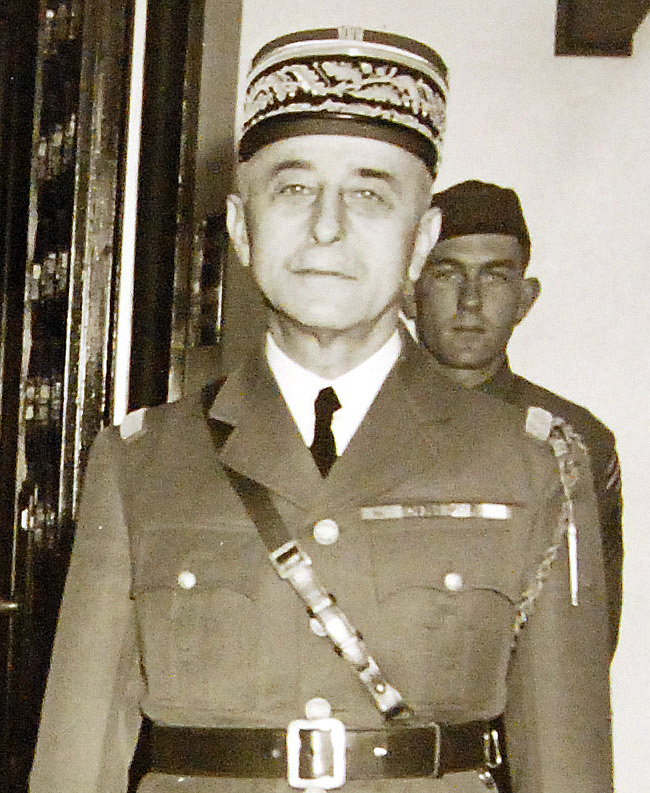
- Noguès at the Casablanca Conference in 1943
- Born: 13 August 1876; Monléon-Magnoac, Hautes-Pyrénées, France
- Died: 20 April 1971 (aged 94); Paris, France
- Education: École Polytechnique
- Military career
- Allegiance: France; Vichy France
- Branch: French Army; Armistice Army
- Service years: 1914–1943
- Rank: General
- Commands: 19th Army Corps; Commander in Chief of all French Forces in North Africa
- Conflicts: World War I; World War II

Charles Noguès (French pronunciation: [ʃaʁl nɔɡɛs]; 13 August 1876 – 20 April 1971) was a French general. He graduated from the École Polytechnique, and he was awarded the Grand Croix of the Legion of Honour in 1939.

He served in field artillery units during World War I. He became commander of 19th Army Corps (France) in French Algeria in 1933. He was appointed Resident General in Morocco by the Léon Blum administration in 1936 where he spearheaded violent campaigns by the colonial administration to quell the labor movement. He was considered a rightist.

Upon the outbreak of World War II, he was named Commander in Chief of all French Forces in North Africa and announced strict measures against German sympathizers. After the fall of France and the installation of the Vichy puppet regime, Noguès aided the Germans, pursued members of the French Resistance and enforced Vichy laws that targeted Jews. When the Allies invaded North Africa, Noguès initially ordered his troops to resist, but when the Allies gained an upper hand, he ordered them to cease fighting. After the war, Noguès was tried and sentenced for treason.

== Early life ==
Noguès was raised in the Pyrenees. He graduated from Ecole Polytechnique.

== Military career ==
He served in field artillery units during World War I.

On 20 March 1933, he became commander of the 19th Army Corps (France), the French Army's forces in French Algeria.

=== World War II ===
During World War II, he served as Resident-General in Morocco and Commander-in-Chief in French North Africa. Noguès was appalled by news that the French government was seeking an armistice with Germany. On 17 June 1940, he telegraphed to Bordeaux, where the government sat: "The whole of North Africa is appalled. The troops beg to continue the struggle if the government has no objection. I am ready to take responsibility for this attitude with all the risks that it entails," i.e. asking for a hint to carry on fighting. However, he did not approve of General Charles de Gaulle's call from London on 18 June to carry on fighting, telling the British liaison officer that he thought de Gaulle's attitude "unseemly" and forbidding the North African press from publishing de Gaulle's appeal.

Noguès accepted the armistice on 22 June, partly because he claimed that Admiral François Darlan would not let him have the French fleet to continue hostilities against the Axis powers. He eventually agreed under pressure from Maxime Weygand's emissary General Louis Koeltz, telegraphing Weygand: "it covers me with shame".

The Allies and the French resistance had hopes that Noguès would lead the North African resistance movement against the Vichy regime.

In 1940, Noguès implemented antisemitic decrees coming from German-controlled Vichy government that excluded Jews from public functions. Sultan Mohammed V refused "Vichy’s plan to ghettoize and deport Morocco’s quarter of a million Jews to the killing factories of Europe", but the French government under Noguès managed to impose some antisemitic laws against the sultan's will. Leon Sultan, of the Moroccan Communist Party, for example, was disbarred.

Noguès was critical of movements in Morocco for reforms in colonial administration. He was of the belief that Moroccan reformers pursued independence and would not be satisfied with liberal reforms in France's colonial administration.

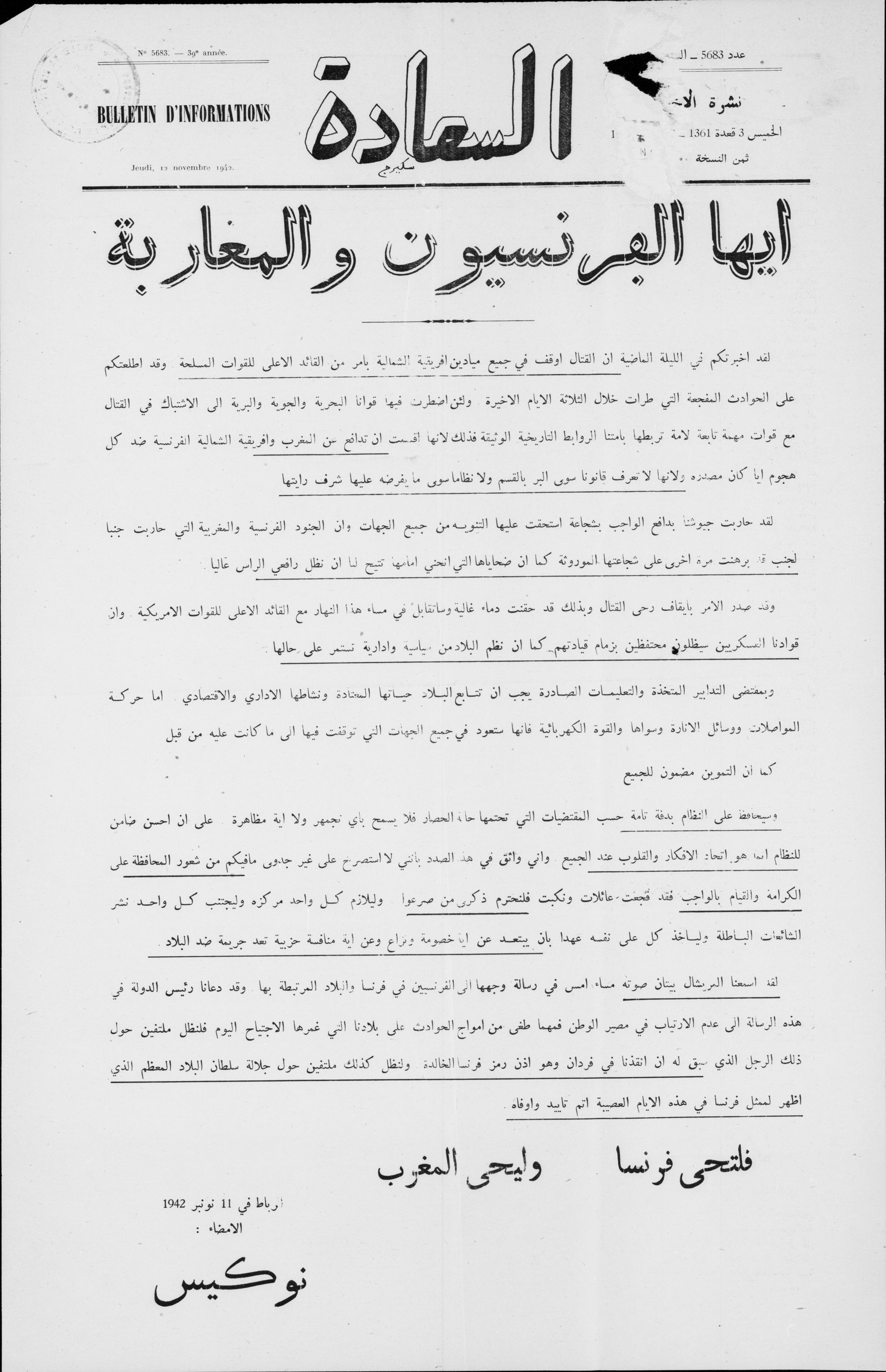
Charles Noguès addresses French and Moroccans after the Allied invasion in November 1942 on the front page of es-Saada, an Arabic propaganda newspaper that was published by the French in Morocco.

When the Allies landed in North Africa on 8 November 1942, he ordered the troops under his command to resist, until the conclusion three days later of the ceasefire, ordered by Darlan. In June 1943, he resigned from his position as Resident General of France in Morocco. Replaced by Gabriel Puaux, he retired to Portugal.

In 1947, he was sentenced in absentia to 20 years of forced labour. He returned to France in June 1954 and became a prisoner there but was immediately released.

== Personal life ==
He was married to the daughter of Théophile Delcassé.

== Book ==
- Lacouture, Jean. De Gaulle: The Rebel 1890–1944 (1984; English ed. 1991), ISBN 978-0-841-90927-4
