= Marcel Peyrouton =

French diplomat and politician

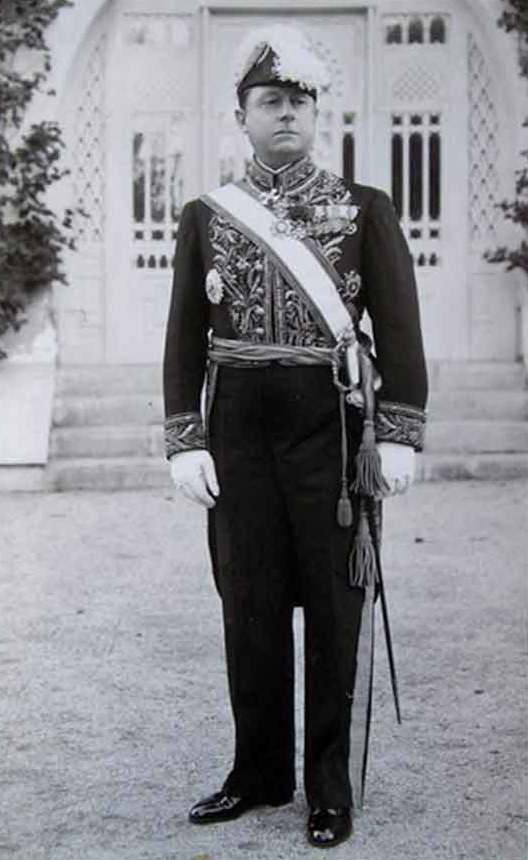
- Marcel Peyrouton in the 1930s
- Born: 2 July 1887; Paris, France
- Died: 6 November 1983 (aged 96); Saint-Cloud, France
- Education: University of Paris
- Occupation: Diplomat
- Spouse: Paulette Malvy
- Relatives: Louis Malvy (father-in-law)

Marcel Peyrouton (French pronunciation: [maʁsɛl peʁutɔ̃]; 2 July 1887 – 6 November 1983) was a French diplomat and politician. He served as the French Minister of the Interior from 1940 to 1941, during Vichy France. He served as the French Ambassador to Argentina from 1936 to 1940, and from 1941 to 1942. He served as the Governor-General of French Algeria in 1943. He was acquitted in 1948.

== Early life ==
Marcel Peyrouton was born in 1887. He received a Doctorate in Law from the University of Paris. His thesis was entitled Étude sur les monopoles en Indochine. In 1910 he entered the central administration of the Colonies as a trainee. In 1914, Mr. Peyrouton was administrator of the Colonies. He joined the army as a sergeant in an infantry regiment. He was wounded on August 24 in the battle of Préjanville [possibly during the Battle of the Trouée de Charmes]. He went into the air force and continued his services as a pilot-aviator in the squadrons of the front, in the Vosges, then in Syria. He was demobilized with the rank of lieutenant-pilot-aviator. During his service he was awarded the Croix de Guerre with two citations.

== Career ==
After the war, Peyrouton was assigned to Madagascar as deputy director of the civil cabinet of the Governor General, then was delegate of the Commissioner of the Republic in Cameroon. He was appointed Chief Administrator of the Colonies in 1923. In 1925, he was director of the Economic Agency of the African territories under mandat. Then in 1928, he served as deputy chief of the cabinet of the Minister of the Colonies. He was appointed Governor of the Colonies in 1929 and served as lieutenant-governor of the Middle Congo. In 1929 he was named an officer of the Legion of Honour. The award is seen in the picture from the 1930s accompanying this article.

Peyrouton next served as the Secretary General of French Algeria from 1931 to 1933, and as the Resident-General of Tunisia from 1933 to 1936. He was Ambassador to Argentina from 1936 to 1940.

After the French surrender in 1940, Peyrouton was appointed Minister of the Interior under Vichy France and served until 1941. In 1941, he was again sent as Ambassador to Argentina.

In January 1943, at the suggestion of US Consul General Robert Daniel Murphy, Peyrouton was appointed Governor-General of French Algeria. While American Jewish organizations objected to his appointment due to his recent Vichy past, Murphy said Peyrouton was not antisemitic. Peyrouton resigned in June. In letters to Generals de Gaulle and Giraud he requested that he be allowed to serve as a captain in the infantry, the rank he held in the army reserve. His offer was accepted but he was arrested preventively on December 22, 1943 on orders from the Committee of National Liberation.

After the war, Peyrouton gave evidence at Pétain's trial, chiefly on the arrest of Laval. He was himself charged with collaboration, but was acquitted by the High Court on December 22, 1948. The Court found that he had made serious mistakes, but these were mitigated by his subsequent efforts to resist the Germans. His name was removed from the list of recipients of the Legion of Honor, suggesting that his award was revoked for his collaboration with Germany.

== Personal life and death ==
Peyrouton married Paulette Malvy, the daughter of politician Louis Malvy. He died on 6 November 1983, aged 96.

== Works ==
- Peyrouton, Marcel (1913). Étude sur les Monopoles en Indochine (Paris: E. Larose).
- Peyrouton, Marcel (1930). Le char des dieux. Paris: Nouvelles editions de Paris. OCLC 33854134.
- Peyrouton, Marcel (1936). Itinéraire de Casablanca à Tunis (1922). Paris: Écrivains français. OCLC 2031793.
- Peyrouton, Marcel (1941). Paroles françaises d'Argentine. Lyon: H. Lardanchet. OCLC 12218469.
- Peyrouton, Marcel (1950). Du service public à la prison commune; souvenirs: Tunis, Rabat, Buenos Aires, Vichy, Alger, Fresnes. Paris: Plon. OCLC 2225836.
- Peyrouton, Marcel (1966). Histoire générale du Maghreb: Algérie, Maroc, Tunisie, des origines à nos jours. Paris: A. Michel. OCLC 3058775.
