= André Adam =

André Adam may refer to:

- André Adam (academic) (1911–1991), French sociologist specializing in Morocco
- André Adam (diplomat) (1936–2016), Belgian diplomat
