= André Adam (academic) =

French ethnologist

- Born: André Clément Henri Adam; 30 July 1911; Saint-Lô
- Died: 2 July 1991 (aged 79); Veulettes-sur-Mer

André Clément Henri Adam (30 July 1911, in Saint-Lô – 2 July 1991, in Veulettes-sur-Mer) was a French colonial researcher and professor specialized in the social sciences, letters, Arabic, and North Africa. He wrote extensively on Casablanca, Morocco, publishing a two volume study of the city's transformation with contact with the west entitled Casablanca: essai sur la transformation de la société marocaine au contact de l'Occident, and a general history of the city up to 1914 entitled Histoire de Casablanca: des origines à 1914.

== Education ==
He studied literature at l’École normale supérieure (1933), earned a diploma from l’École libre des sciences politiques (1935), and earned an Agrégation de Lettres (1936). He also held a certification in Standard Arabic from L’Institut des hautes-études marocaines (1942), and a doctorat d’État in letters and human sciences from Paris-Sorbonne University with high honors (1968).

== Career ==
He was appointed to work for the Direction générale des affaires indigènes du Maroc of the French Protectorate in Morocco (1943–1945) and was made an honorary reserve captain. He served in various civil roles as a professor agrégé in Rabat 1937, Fes 1941, and at L’Institut des hautes études marocaines in Rabat (1946–1949). He served as the director of L’École marocaine d’administration 1955–1960, also in Rabat. He taught as a professor of sociology at the Faculty of Letters at Aix-Marseille University until 1970. He was named professor emeritus at Paris Descartes University (1980).

His publications on Casablanca, Casablanca: essai sur la transformation de la société marocaine au contact de l'Occident and Histoire de Casablanca: des origines à 1914, are heavily cited by authors writing later about the city, such as Abdallah Laroui, Jean-Louis Cohen, and Susan Gilson Miller.

== Publications ==
- Casablanca : essai sur la transformation de la société marocaine au contact de l'Occident. Paris : C.N.R.S., 1968
- Histoire de Casablanca : des origines à 1914. Gap : Ophrys, 1968

== Awards ==
- Legion of Honour
- Ordre national du Mérite
- Officier de l’Académie 1949
- Order of Ouissam Alaouite 1962
