= Avenue Habib Bourguiba =

Historical political and economic heart of Tunisia

Avenue Habib Bourguiba شارع حبيب بورڨيبة Şāraɛ Ħbib Būrguibā
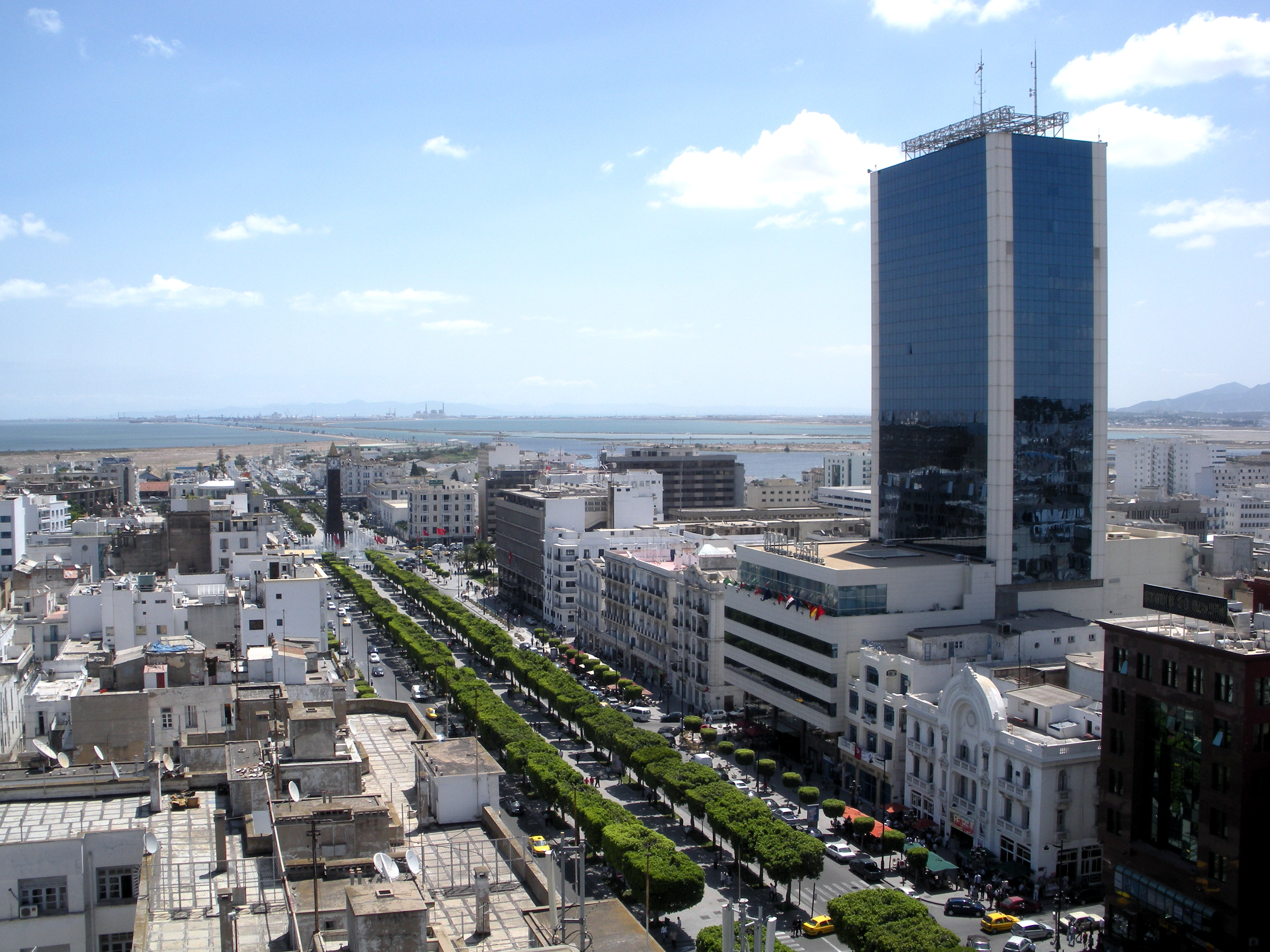

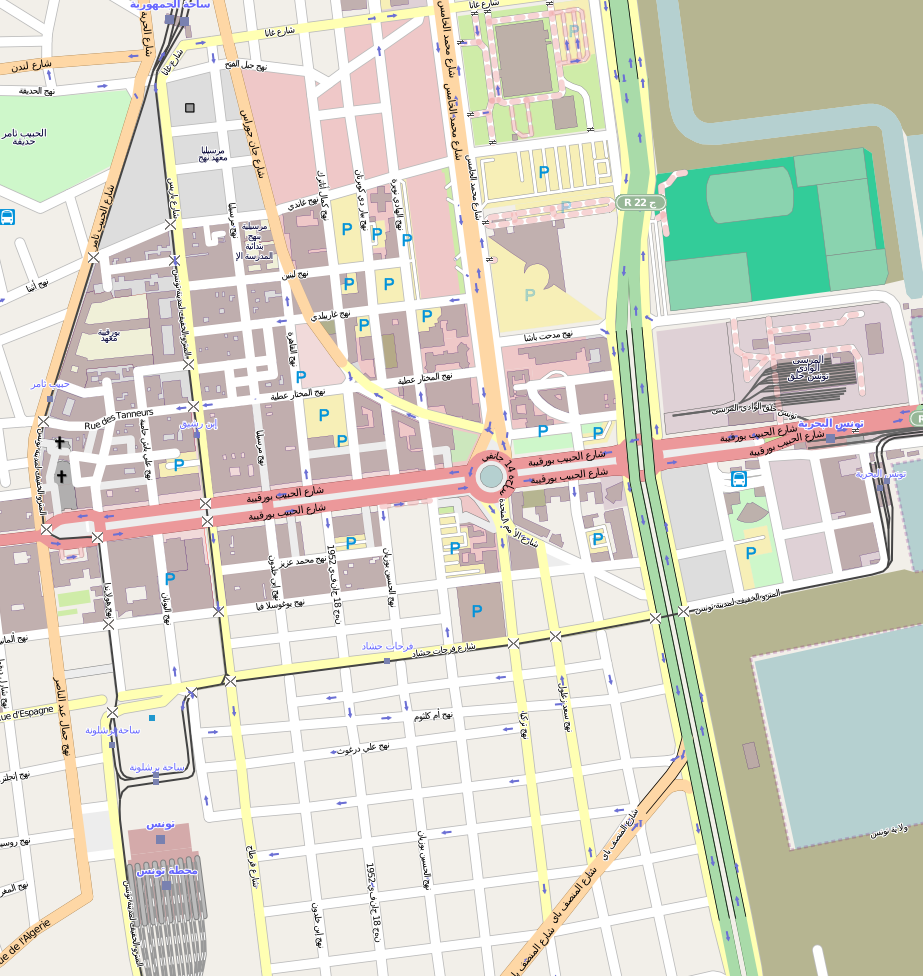
- Owner: Tunis Governorate
- Length: 1,500 m (4,900 ft)
- Width: 60 m (200 ft)
- Location: Tunis, Tunisia
- Coordinates: 36.800054°N 10.185184°E
- East end: Lake of Tunis
- West end: Independence Square (Tunis)

Construction
- Completed: 1855

Avenue Habib Bourguiba (Tunisian Arabic: شارع حبيب بورڨيبة) is the central thoroughfare of Tunis, and the historical political and economic heart of Tunisia. It is named for Habib Bourguiba, the first President of Tunisia and the national leader of the Tunisian independence movement. Today, the broad Avenue aligned in an east-west direction, lined with trees and facades of shops, and fronted with street cafes on both sides, and which is compared to the Champs-Élysées in Paris, and its extension, the Avenue de France, Place de l'Indépendance marking the central roundabout with Lake of Tunis at the eastern end. Many of the important monuments are located along this avenue, including Cathedral of St. Vincent de Paul, French Embassy in Tunisia and Théâtre municipal de Tunis.

Most cities in Tunisia also have an Avenue Habib Bourguiba.

== History ==
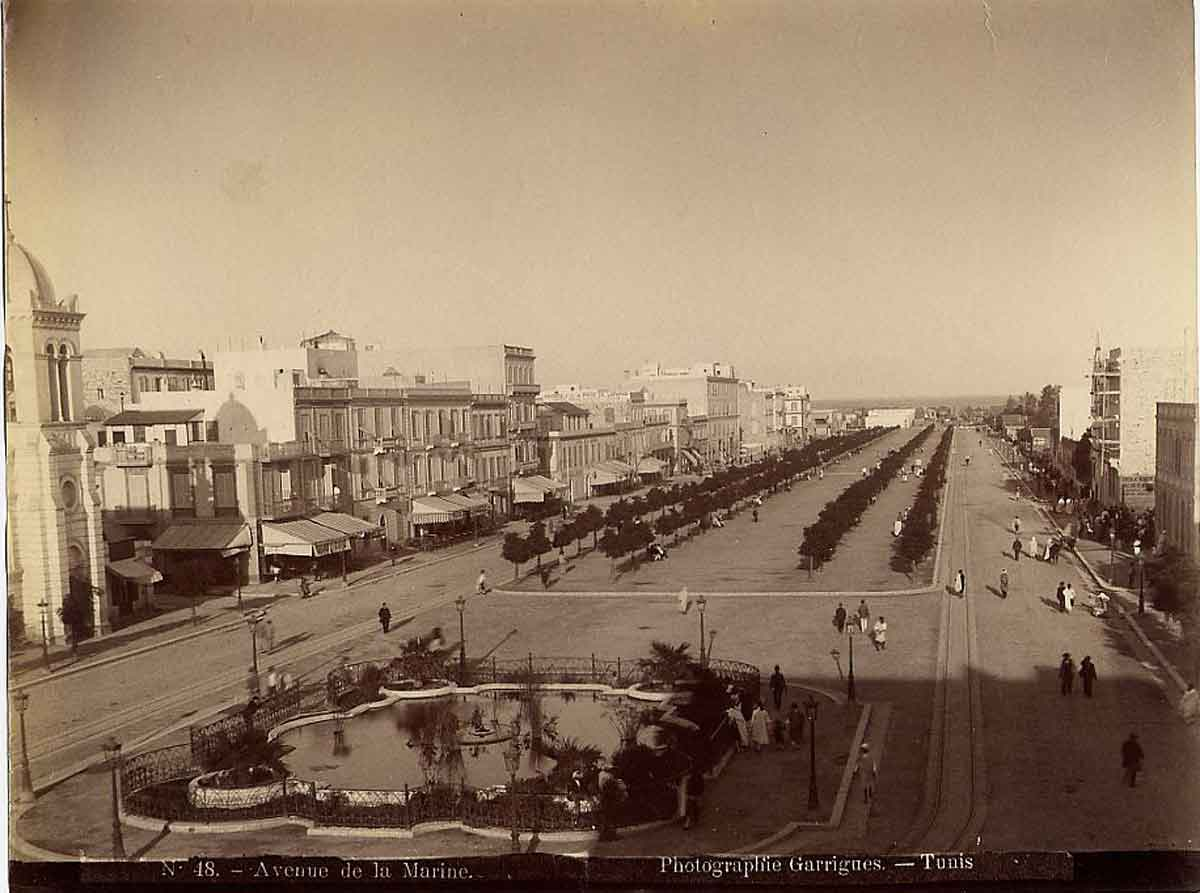
Avenue de la Marine in 1885

The road was originally known as the "Promenade de la Marine", a poor quality road which grew muddy in winter and dusty in summer. Within thirty years after the introduction of the French protectorate of Tunisia, the town grew up to the east of the Medina. The Consulate of France, became the seat of the French residence and built in 1890–1892. The avenue became the entertainment centre of the city too, and the playground for the city's elite. In 1920 the Municipal Theatre was built. In addition, the Cathédrale Saint-Vincent-de-Paul de Tunis was completed in 1897. On the eve of the First World War, the new major street in the centre was renamed Avenue Jules-Ferry after Jules Ferry.

During the protests of 2011, many demonstrations calling for the downfall of President Zine El Abidine Ben Ali and that of the national unity government were held on the avenue.

== Layout ==
Sixty meters wide, it has two unpaved roads on both sides of a median strip planted with, until 2001, a quadruple range of ficus trees (reduced to two rows in a major 2000–2001 renovation). Important private buildings such as The Coliseum (galleries, cafes and movie theatres) in 1931 and the Hotel Claridge in 1932 came to be built. At the advent of independence in 1956, the statue was toppled and the avenue was renamed after the new president Habib Bourguiba. New private buildings emerged from extensive investments, such as international hotels.

The Bab Bhar (Porte de France), now a free-standing arch, is located at the termination of the Avenue de France, which in itself is an extension of the Ave Habib Bourgiba; beyond this old portal is the medina. At the eastern end of the Avenue Bourguiba, there is a causeway crossing Lake Tunis that carries the road and metro rail traffic and connects the city center with the La Goulette (Halq al Wadi), an elegant old port; the posh suburbs of Carthage, Sidi Bou Said and La Marsa.

To the west of the Bab Bhar is the Rue de La Kasbah that terminates at the Government offices on the other side of the port; the Rue Jema Mosque (Grand Mosque) is at the heart of the port.

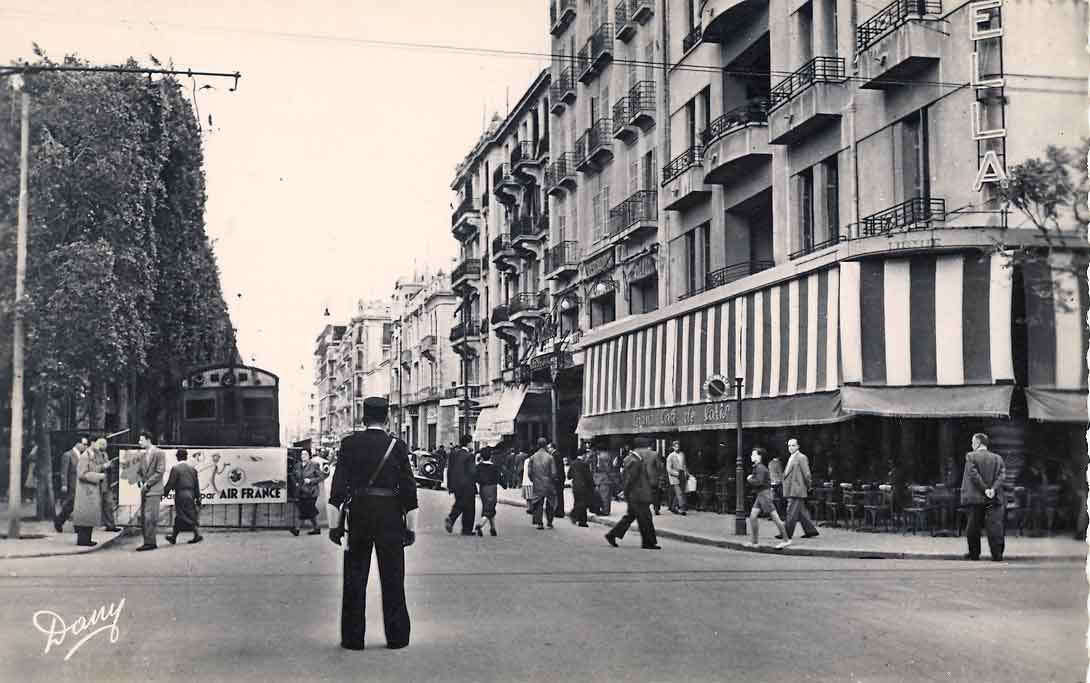
Avenue Jules-Ferry (1954)

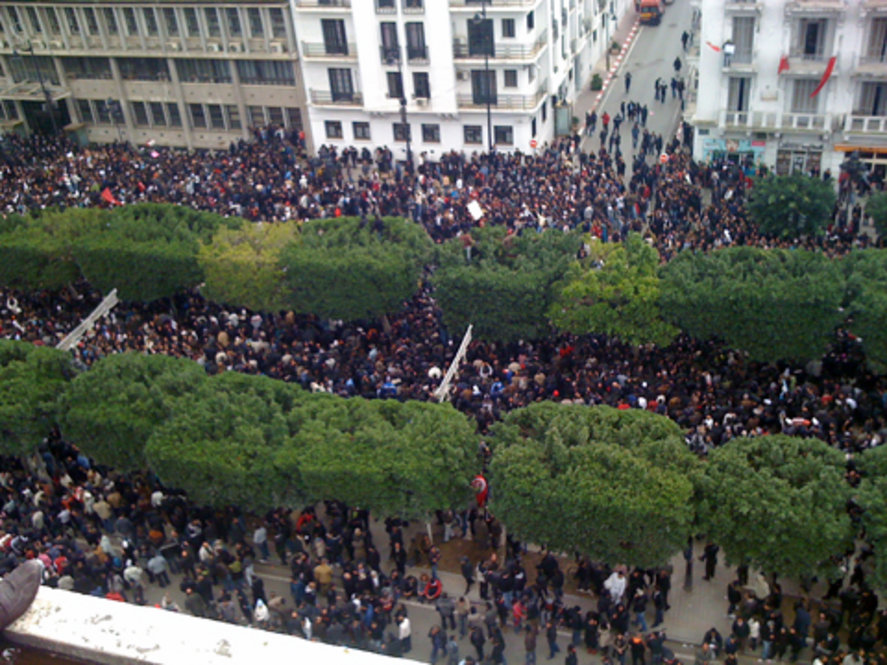
Unrest in 2011

== Place de l'Indépendance ==
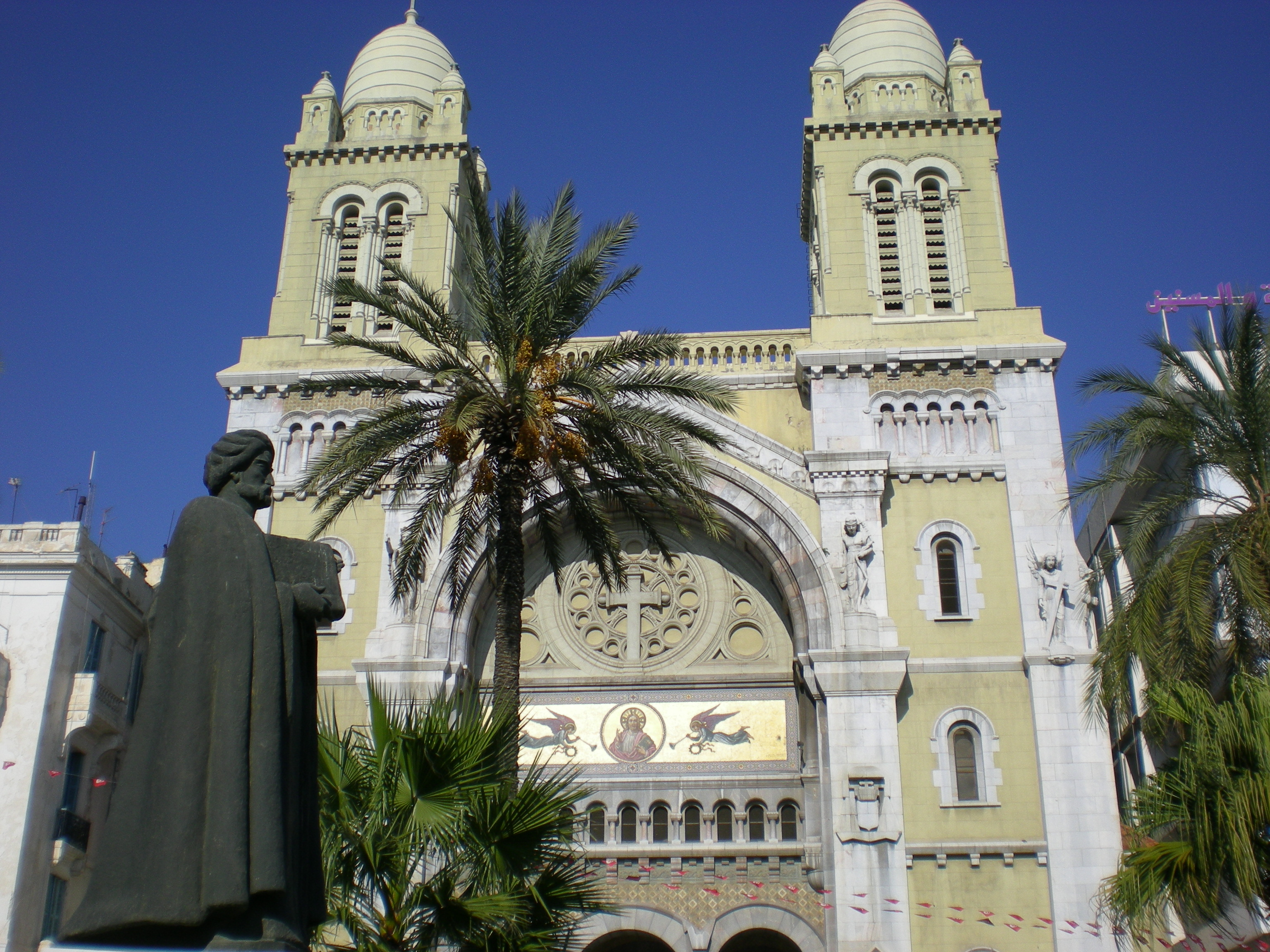
Statue of Ibn Khaldoun at the Cathedral of St. Vincent de Paul

To the west, the artery ends on the Place de l'Indépendance (Independence Square). The space is framed by the French Embassy and Cathedral of St. Vincent de Paul. At its centre stands a statue of the Tunisian philosopher and historian Ibn Khaldoun, looking towards the Avenue Habib Bourguiba and lake beyond. It had originally been intended for the statue to be erected on June 1, 1978, on the anniversary of Habib Bourguiba's return to Tunis after the French colonialism, but it did not take place until July 3.

=== French Embassy ===
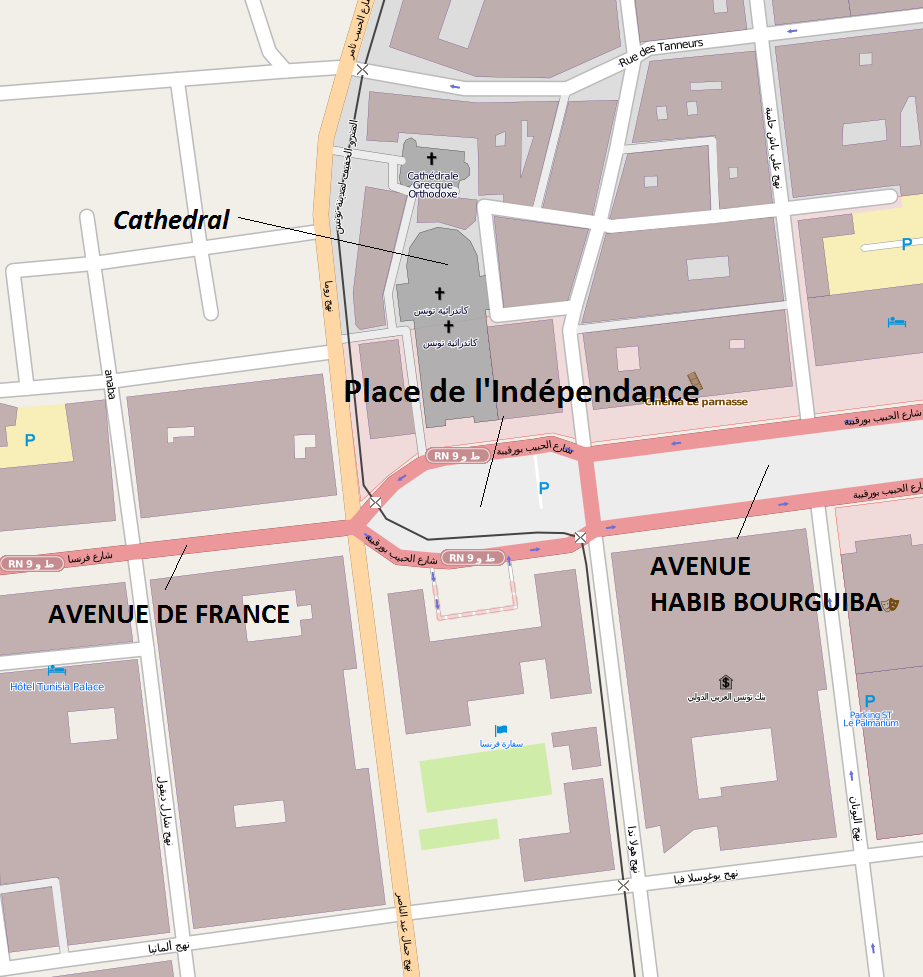
Place de l'Indépendance

The French Embassy in Tunisia, opening on the south side of the square, is located in buildings constructed in December 1861. Twenty years later they became the general residence of the French in Tunis.

=== Cathédrale Saint-Vincent-de-Paul ===
The Cathedral of St. Vincent de Paul, originally the seat of the Archdiocese of Carthage, sits opposite the French Embassy. Built in a Romanesque-Byzantine style at the end the nineteenth century, it opens on the north side of the square.

=== Municipal Theatre ===
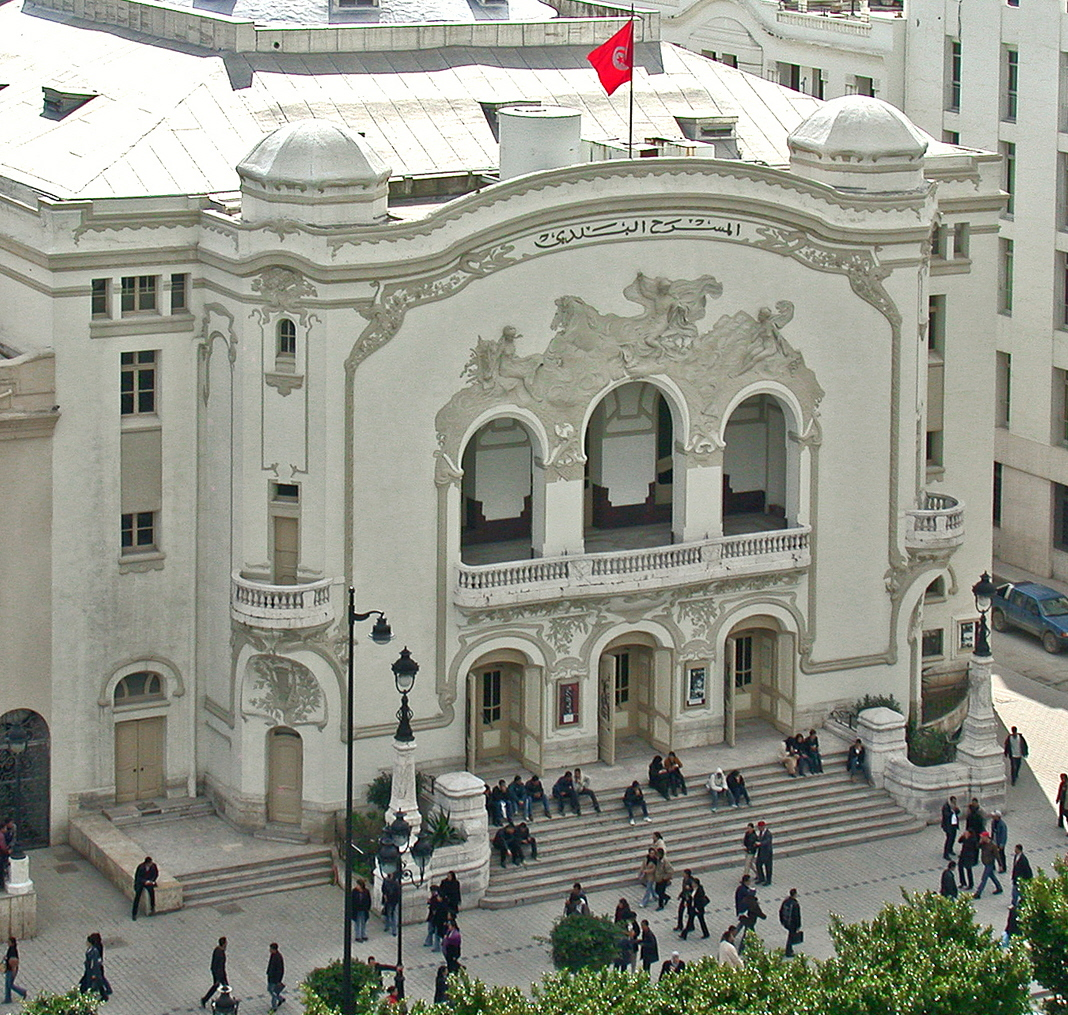
Art nouveau facade of the theatre

The Municipal Theatre, which opened November 20, 1902, is one of the few theatres in Art Nouveau style in the world. Partially demolished in 1909, it was converted and enlarged to be opened again on January 4, 1911. A total renovation of the theatre was completed in 2001 for its centenary.

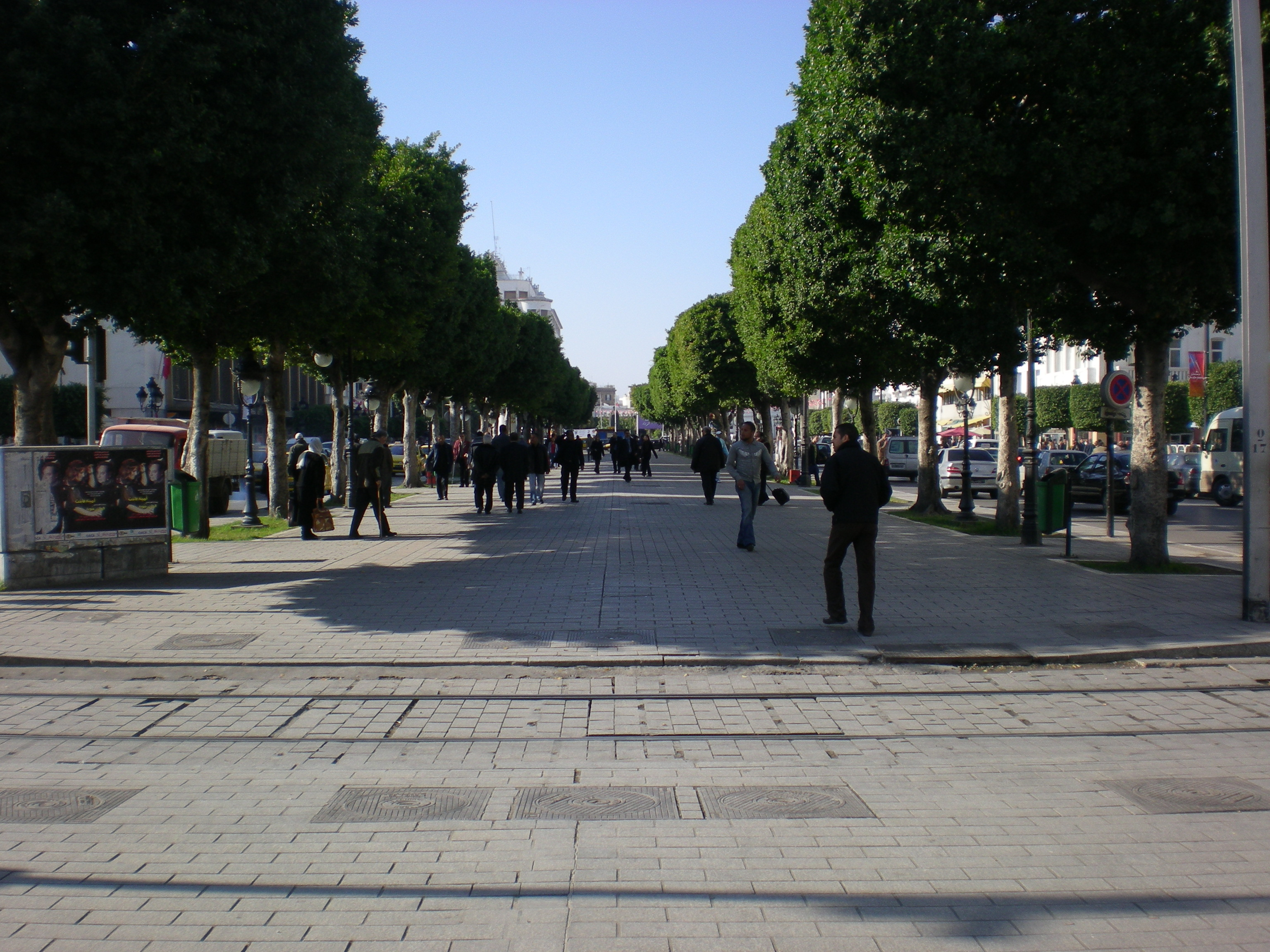
Street-level view of the Avenue.

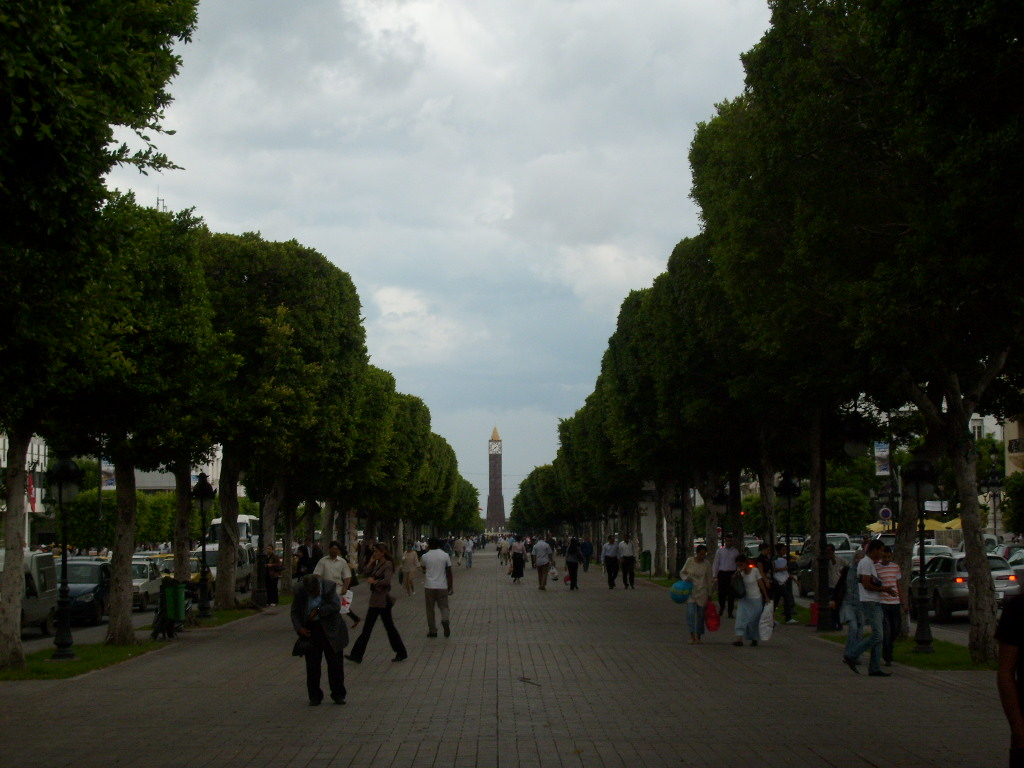
Street-level view of the Avenue.

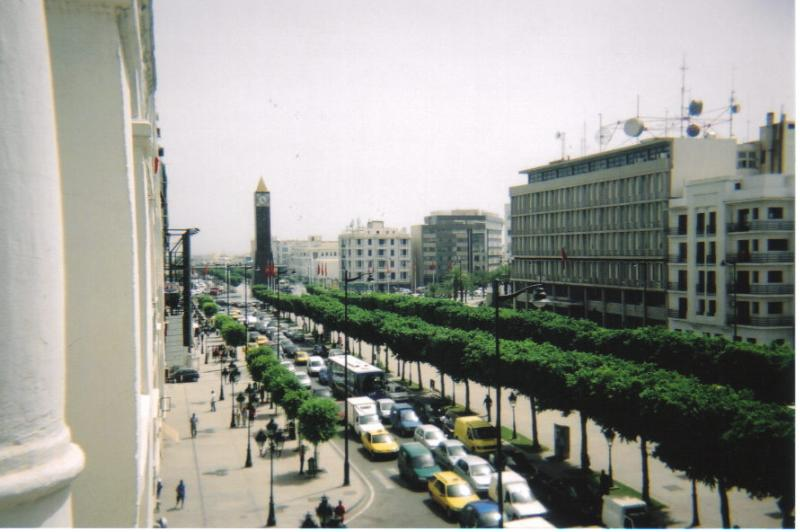
Overlooking the Avenue.

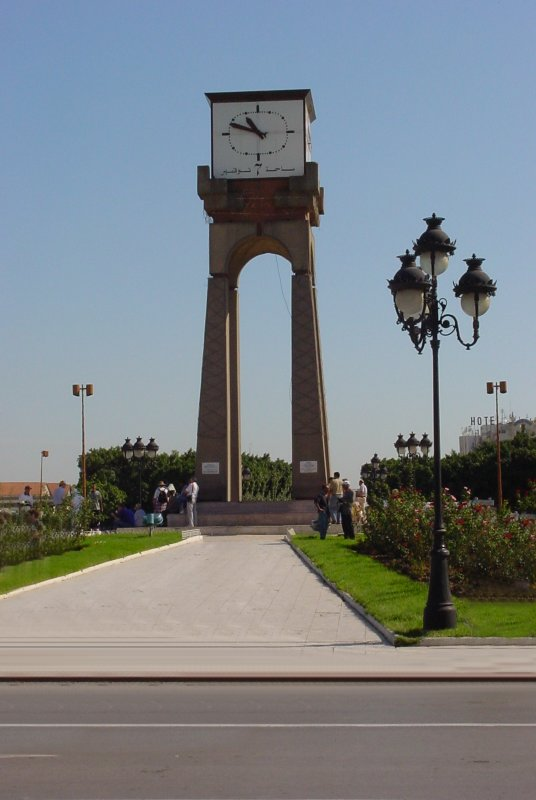
Former "alarm clock" commemorating November 7, 1987.

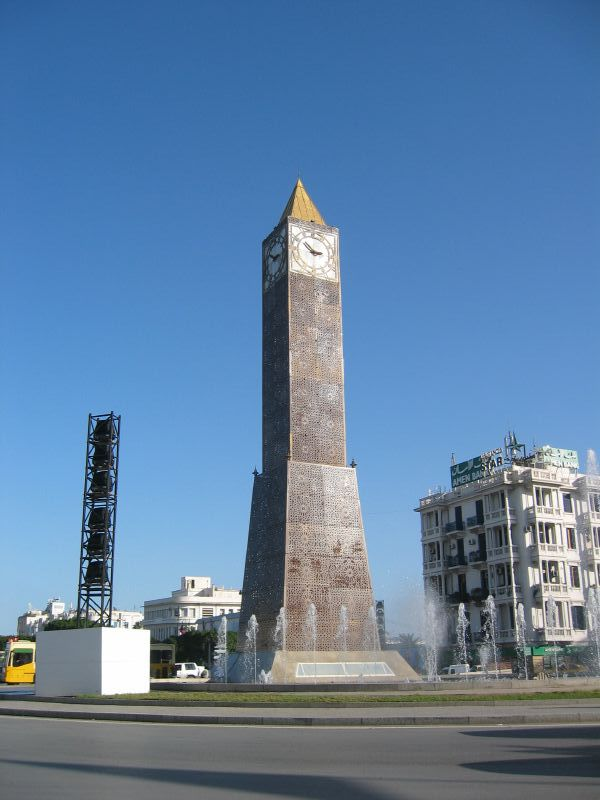
Clock obelisk.

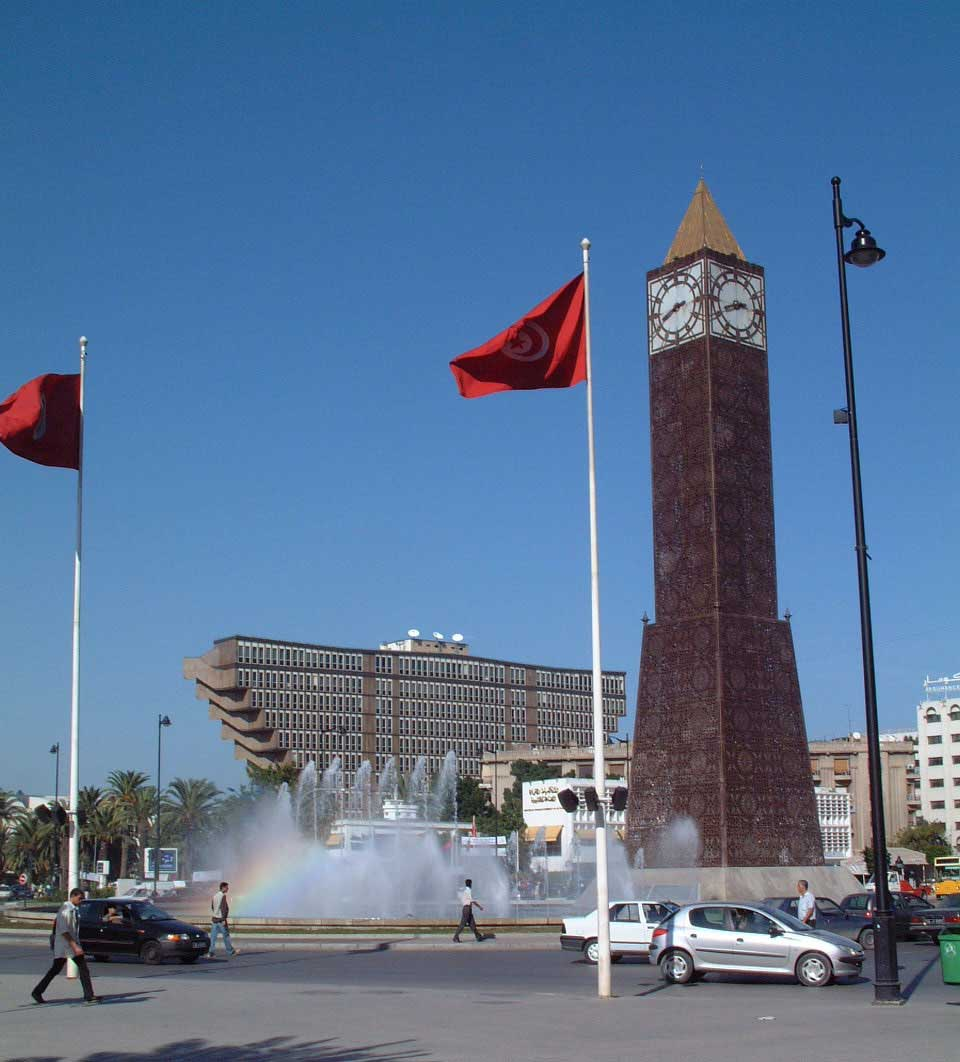
View of the Place 14 janvier 2011.

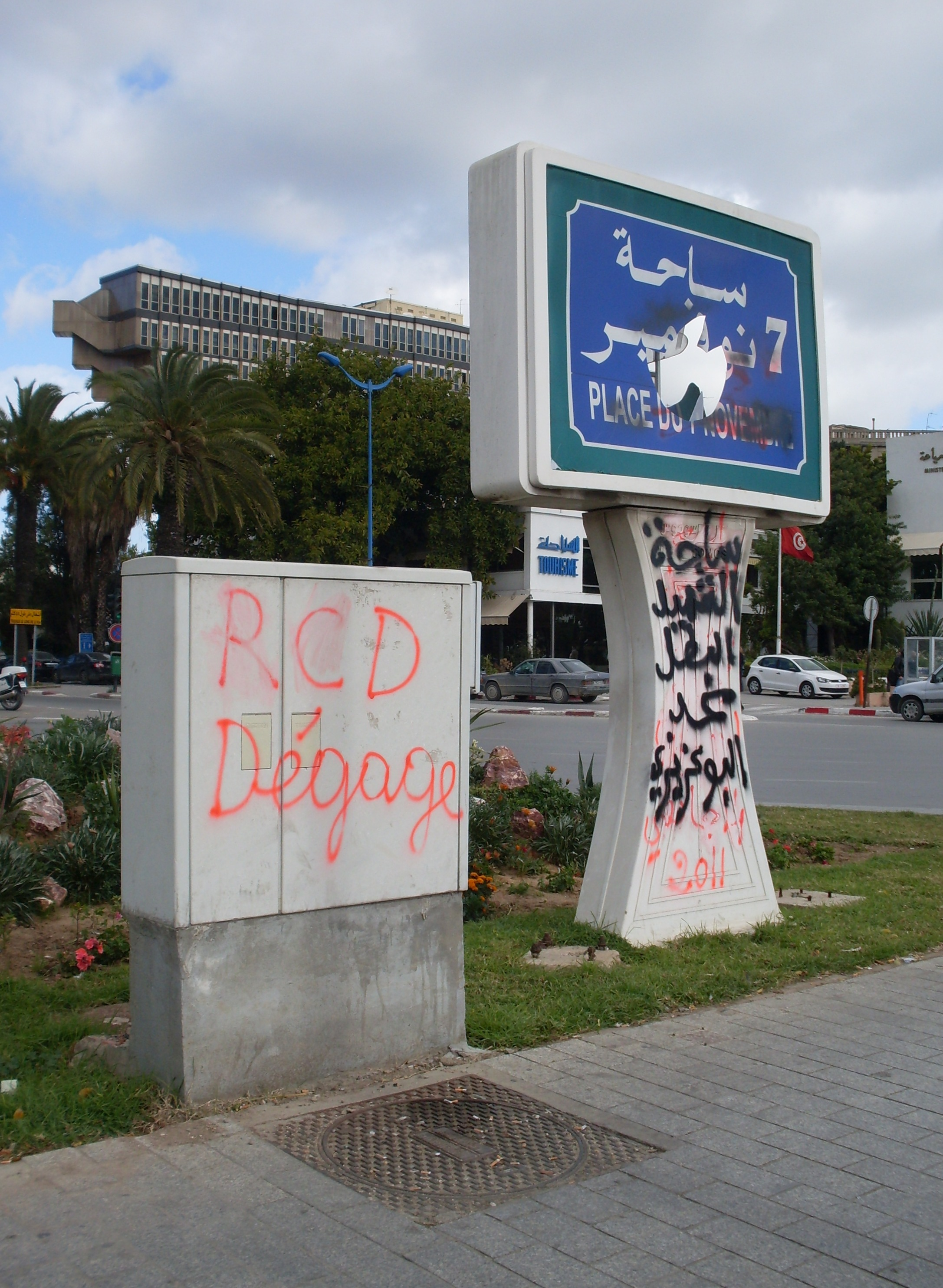
Damage from the 2011 revolution.

== Bibliography ==
- Paul Sebag, Tunis. Histoire d'une ville, éd. L'Harmattan, 1998 ISBN 2-7384-6610-9
