= Théâtre municipal de Tunis =

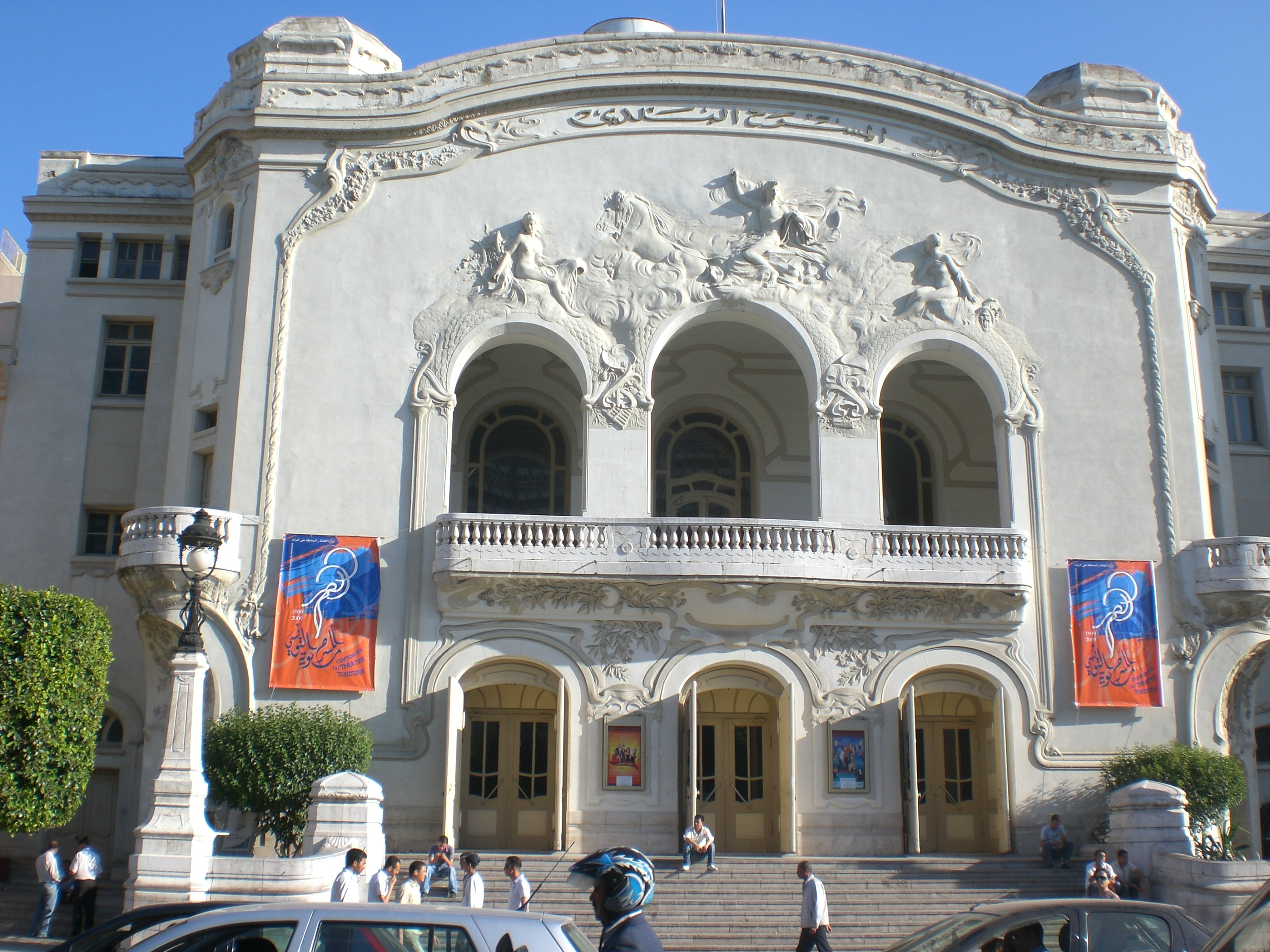
- Facade of the Théâtre municipal de Tunis
- Interactive map of Théâtre municipal de Tunis
- Address: Tunisia
- Location: Tunis
- Coordinates: 36°47′57″N 10°10′51″E
- Capacity: 1,350
- Type: Indoor theater

Construction
- Opened: November 20, 1902

Website
- theatremunicipal-tunis.gov.tn

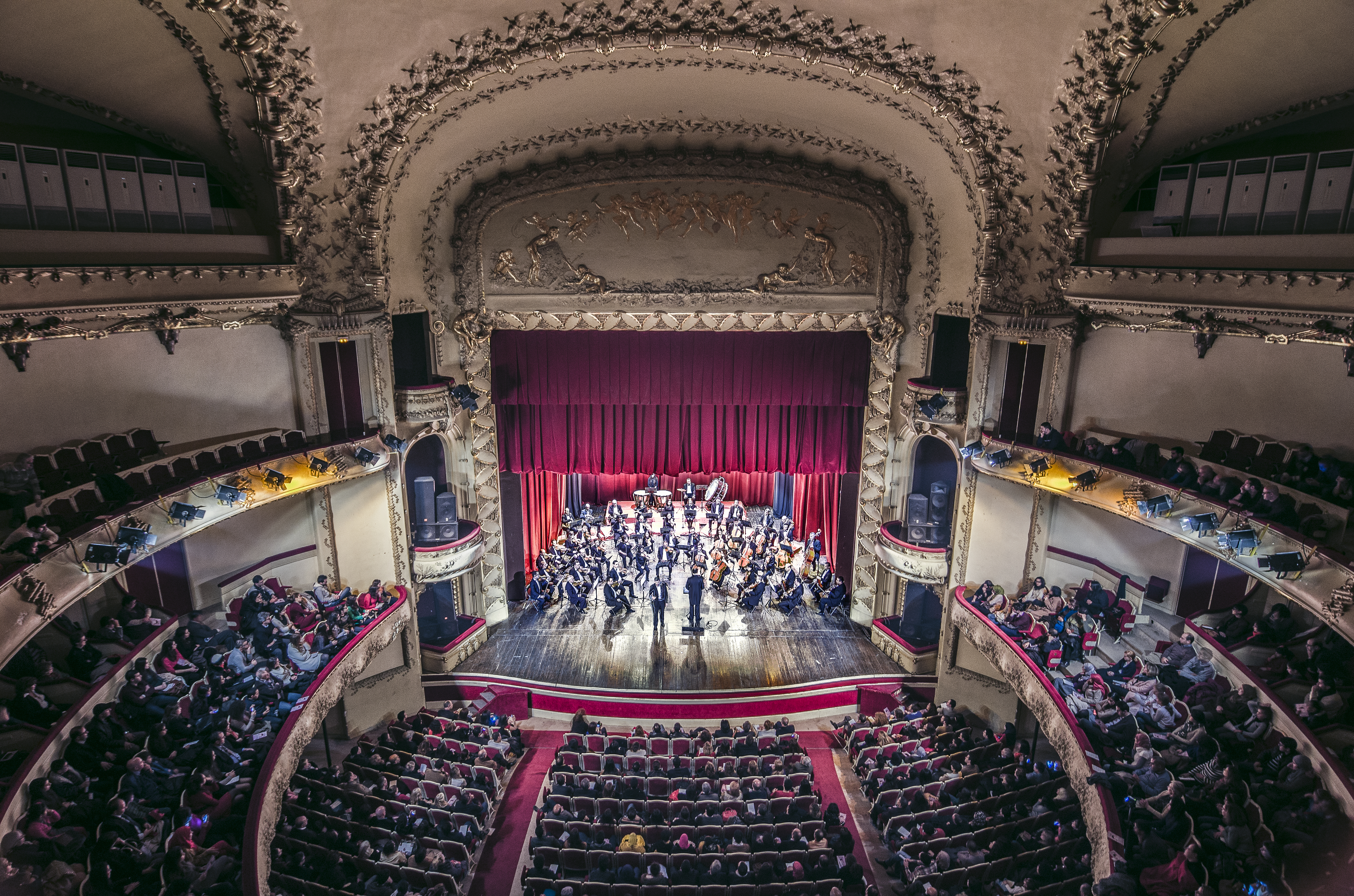
Interior of the Municipal Theater of Tunis

The Théâtre municipal de Tunis (engl. Municipal Theatre of Tunis) in Tunisia, Built in the Art Nouveau style on Avenue Jules-Ferry (now Avenue Habib-Bourguiba), was first opened on November 20, 1902 and currently showcases opera, ballet, symphonic concerts and dramas featuring numerous Tunisian, Arab and international actors. It was then called the Municipal Casino of Tunis.
