= French Protectorate Residence, Rabat =

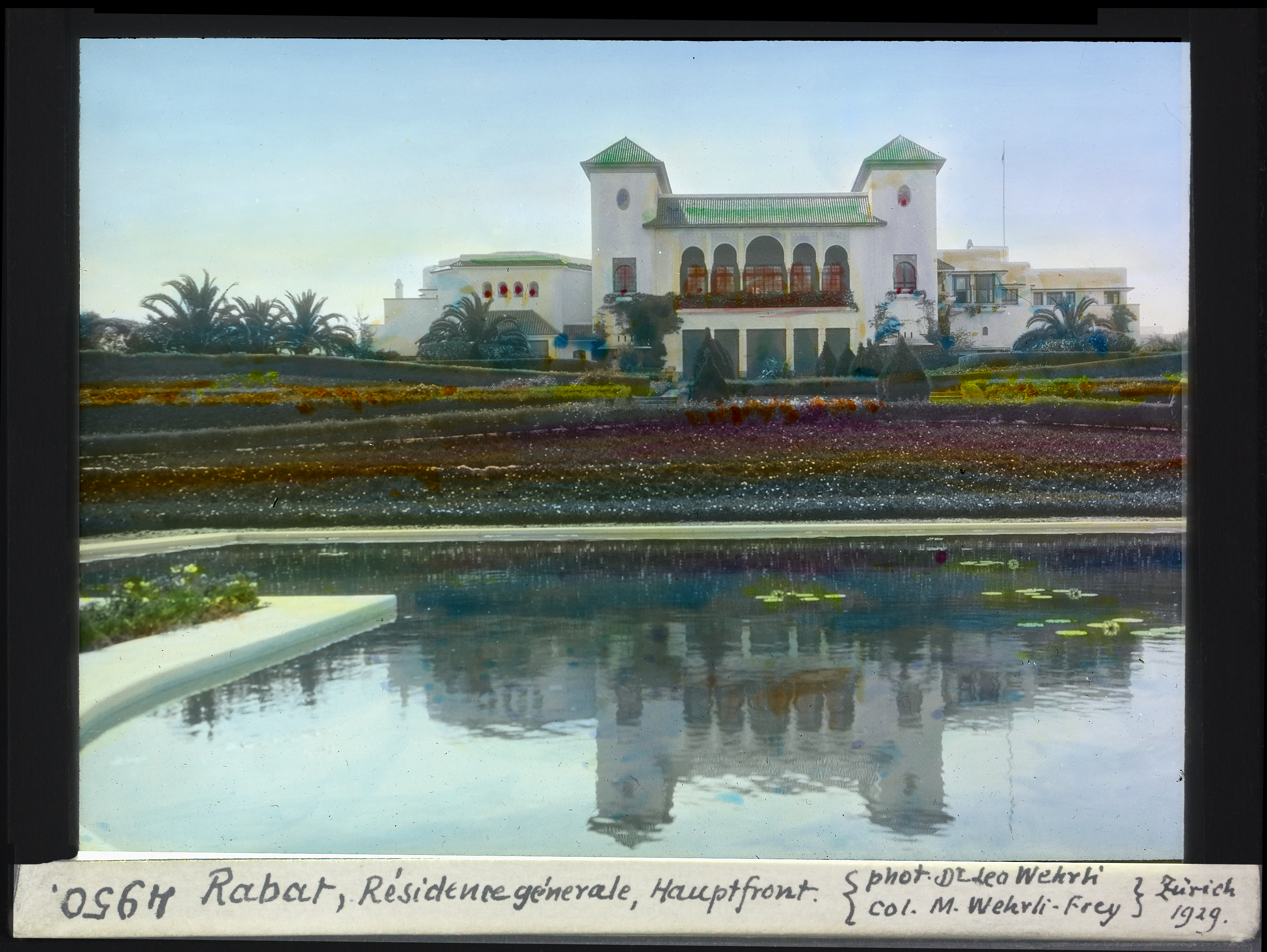
The Residence in 1929

The French Protectorate Residence also known as Residence-general (French: résidence générale) or Residence of Lyautey, is a historic building in Rabat, Morocco. It was the seat of the Resident-general in the French protectorate in Morocco from its completion in 1924 to the end of the protectorate in 1956.

Following Moroccan independence, the property became the chancery of the French Embassy, before being transferred to the Moroccan authorities in the 1980s and repurposed for the Moroccan Ministry of Interior.

== Background ==
The Mnebhi Palace in Fez was the first seat of the resident-general following the signature in that same building of the Treaty of Fes on 30 March 1912. Later in 1912, the residence moved to the palatial complex formed in Fez by Dar Batha and Dar el-Beida, and remained in Dar al-Beida in 1915 while Dar Batha was repurposed as a museum. Plans were made in the meantime for a permanent establishment in Rabat, where the first Resident-General Hubert Lyautey had decided to relocate the capital in September 1912.

== Residence-general of the Protectorate ==
Lyautey chose the hilltop site known as "the three fig trees" for his residence, overlooking the ancient site of Chellah which lies immediately to its south across the ancient Almohad wall, and with an expansive view of downtown Rabat and Salé to its north. Colonial lore had it that Lyautey selected the site in 1912, at the very beginning of the French protectorate, by tying his horse to an old olive tree on the site. It dominates grounds that were subsequently allocated for the protectorate's central administrative services, now Rabat's governmental quarter (French: Quartier des Ministères), and further west, the Dar al-Makhzen royal palace.

The residence was initially hosted in makeshift structures on the site, and more permanent and suitable construction was delayed by World War I. The complex was designed from 1916 by French architect Albert Laprade, who resided in Morocco from 1917 to 1919, with assistance from Adrien Laforgue, under the authority of the protectorate's directorate for architecture and urban design and its head Henri Prost. It was inaugurated in early April 1922 by French President Alexandre Millerand, and completed in 1924. It blends modern design concepts and French references such as André Le Nôtre with Moorish Revival architecture, partly inspired by the Generalife in Granada and including a copy of the fountain at Funduq al-Najjarin in Fez.

The gardens surrounding the Residence building were laid out by landscape architect Marcel Zaborski, who had arrived in Morocco in 1921.

On 8 December 1942, a month after the Allied invasion of Morocco as part of Operation Torch, U.S. Major General George S. Patton visited the Residence and was received with military honors by Resident-general Charles Noguès. Patton noted in his diary that "Mrs. Nogues is a very clever woman she probably furnishes the brains for Nogues who is a clever crook only moved by self interest but he knows I am his best interest for the moment so that is that." Also attending were French General Robert Boissau, Georges-Eugène-Joseph Lascroux, Auguste La Houlle, and Admiral Michelieu; and U.S. Major Generals Geoffrey Keyes, Ernest N. Harmon, and Jonathan W. Anderson. Patton also had a bilateral conversation there with Grand vizier Muhammad al-Muqri. A film recording of the day's pomp and ceremony has been preserved.

Towards the end of the protectorate era, the hilltop Residence was nicknamed the "Sacred Hill" (French: la colline sacrée).

== Embassy of France ==
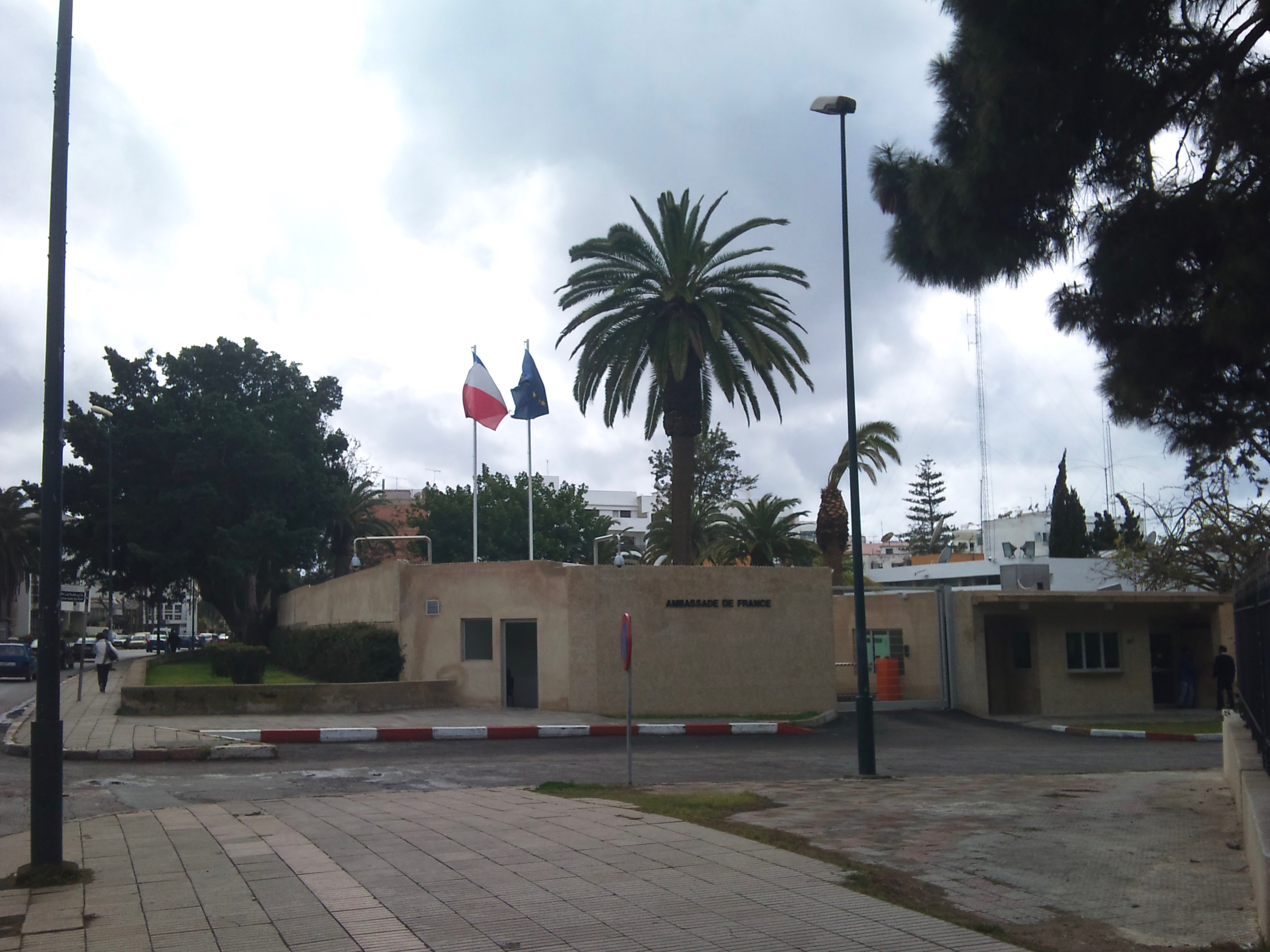
France’s embassy in Rabat, after relocation in the 1980s

Following the independence of Morocco in 1956, the Residence became the chancery of the French Embassy in Morocco. The building's central location in Rabat's government quarter, however, made it an unsustainable reminder of France's former colonial regime. In the 1970s, France and Morocco negotiated a series of real estate agreements, one on 30 October 1975 to build a new embassy on a less central location in Western Rabat, and another on 6 March 1979 to finalize the transfer of the residence and other French properties to the Moroccan state. The new embassy complex designed by architect Guillermo Jullian de la Fuente, which includes offices and residences for France's diplomats, was built in phases from 1976 to 1986.

== Moroccan Ministry of Interior ==
After the embassy left, the adjacent Ministry of Interior of Morocco, then led by the powerful Driss Basri, annexed the property in the mid-1980s.

A project was developed in the early 2010s to relocate Rabat's Museum of History and Civilizations on the former Residence grounds, and further publicized in 2020, but was not implemented.

== Lyautey's mausoleum ==
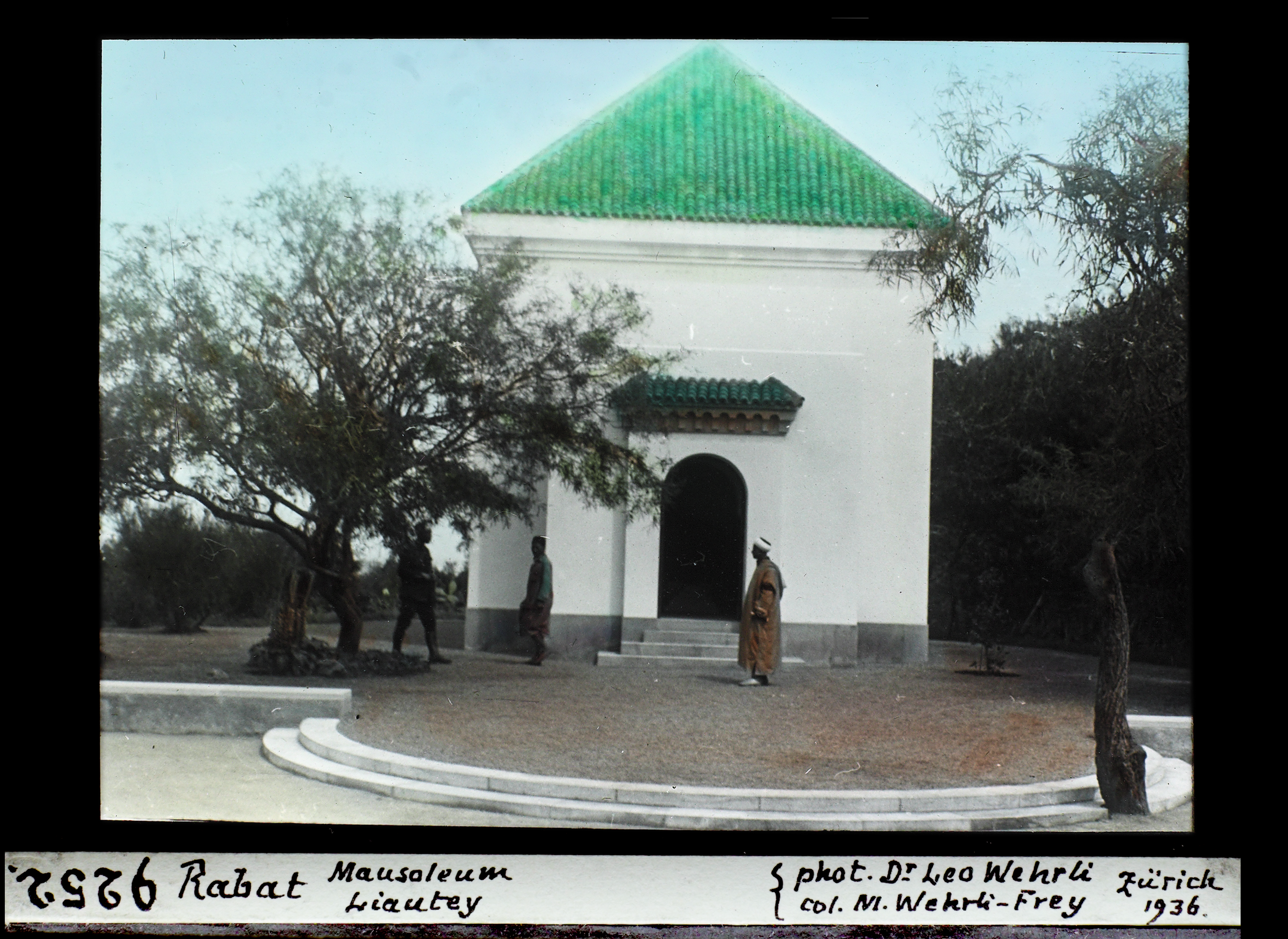
Lyautey's Mausoleum in 1936

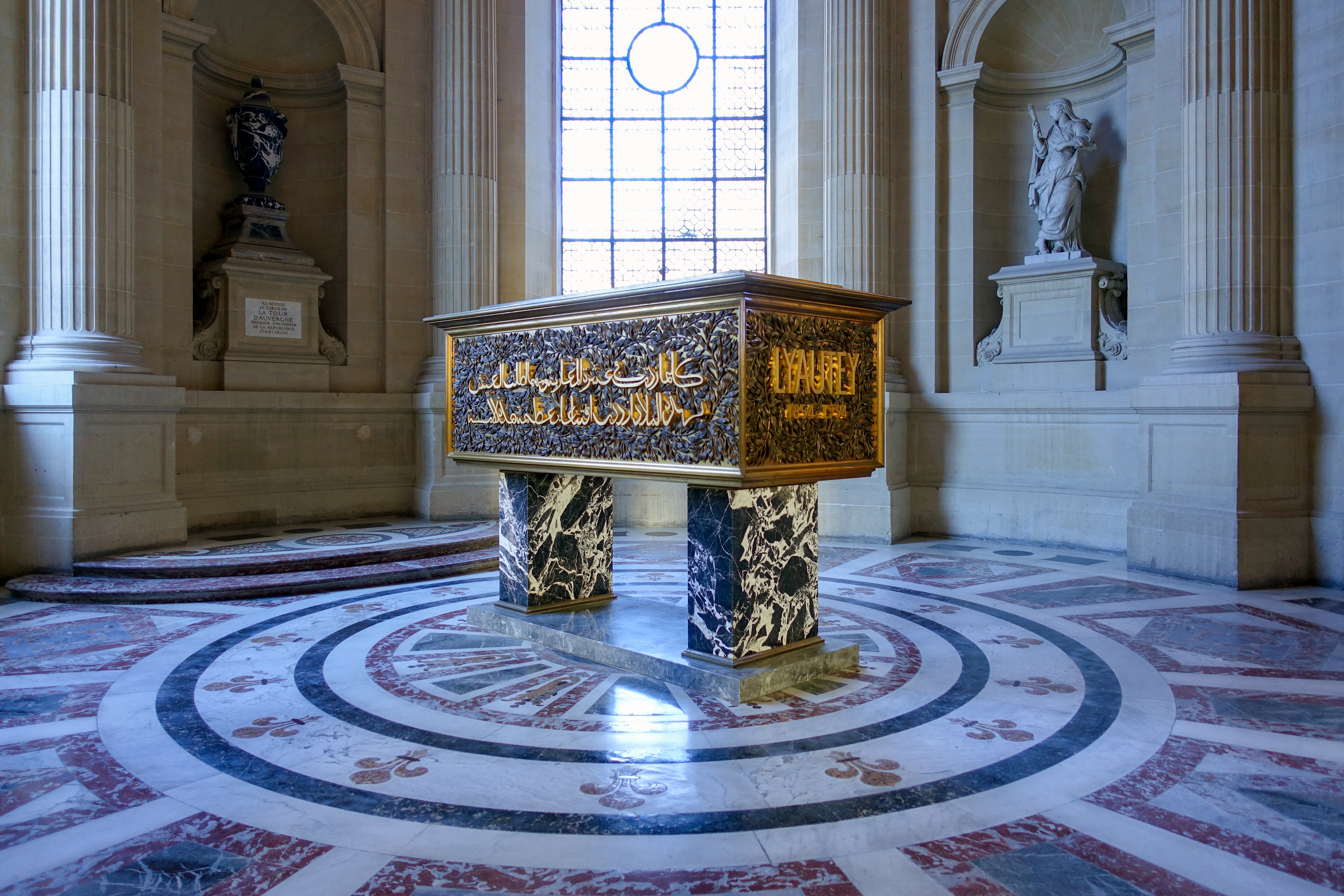
Lyautey's tomb, Les Invalides

After resigning from the position of Resident-general in 1925, Lyautey planned for his own burial in Rabat and in 1933 requested painter Joseph de La Nézière to produce a sketch for his mausoleum as a traditional Muslim Qubba. Following Lyautey's death in France on 27 July 1934 and his state funeral at Nancy Cathedral on 3 August 1934, Resident-general Henri Ponsot decided to locate his resting place on the Residence's grounds rather than in more iconic locations such as Chellah or near the Hassan Tower, which could have offended Muslim Moroccan sensitivities. Even so, the erection of a monument to Morocco's Christian colonizer was controversial and criticized by Mohamed Belhassan Wazzani and other nationalist and Muslim leaders. Reflecting those misgivings, Sultan Mohammed V of Morocco declined to attend the funeral on the Residence grounds on 31 October 1935, when Lyautey's remains were eventually placed in the completed mausoleum, even though he participated in a ceremony earlier the same day at Bab er-Rouah in downtown Rabat. The mausoleum building was designed by architect René Canu based on La Nézière's sketch.

Lyautey's mausoleum was the theme of a Moroccan stamp in 1945, which emphasized the use of the Cross of Lorraine in its interior decoration. Lyautey was born in Nancy and was fond of his native region, thus the choice of ornamental motif by the mausoleum's designers. Meanwhile, the Cross of Lorraine had become the emblem of Free France under Charles de Gaulle, giving the stamp's image multiple meanings.

Following Moroccan independence, French President Charles de Gaulle and Mohammed V, by then the King of Morocco, agreed to preempt the risk of incidents around the still controversial mausoleum and to repatriate Lyautey's remains, which were ceremoniously removed on 22 April 1961 and shipped to France via Casablanca. The mausoleum remained empty thereafter, and was eventually torn down following the transfer of property to the Moroccan authorities. Lyautey was reburied in Les Invalides in Paris, first in the crypte des Gouverneurs of the church of Saint-Louis-des-Invalides on 10 May 1961, and then in 1963 in the complex's Dome Church. There, his remains lie in an ornamented casket designed by Albert Laprade, the Residence's original architect almost a half-century earlier, and made by celebrated art deco metalworker Raymond Subes.

== Influence ==
The urban design of the protectorate's administrative departments around the Residence has been claimed to be a source of inspiration for the governmental quarter around Capital Hill in Canberra, Australia.

== See also ==
- Royal Palace of Tétouan, former seat of the High Commissioner in the Spanish protectorate in Morocco
- People's Palace (Algiers), former seat of the Governor-general in French Algeria
- Embassy of France, Tunis, former seat of the Resident-general in the French protectorate of Tunisia
- Institut des Hautes Études Marocaines, established by Lyautey next to the Residence
