= Embassy of France, Tunis =

Diplomatic mission of France in Tunisia, located in Tunis

Embassy of France in Tunis
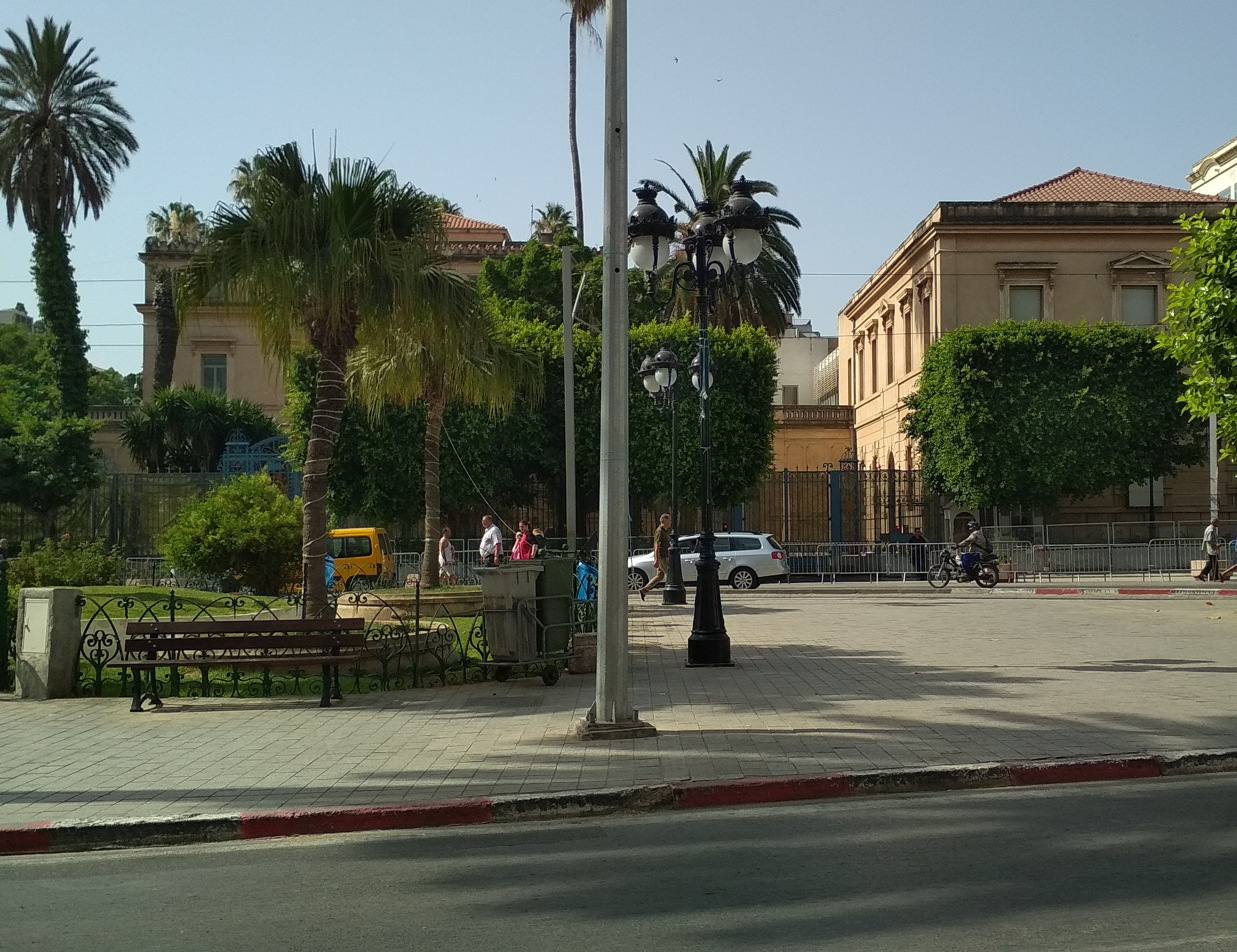
- Location: Tunis, Tunisia
- Address: 2 Pl. de l'Indépendance, Tunis 1000, Tunisia
- Ambassador: André Parant

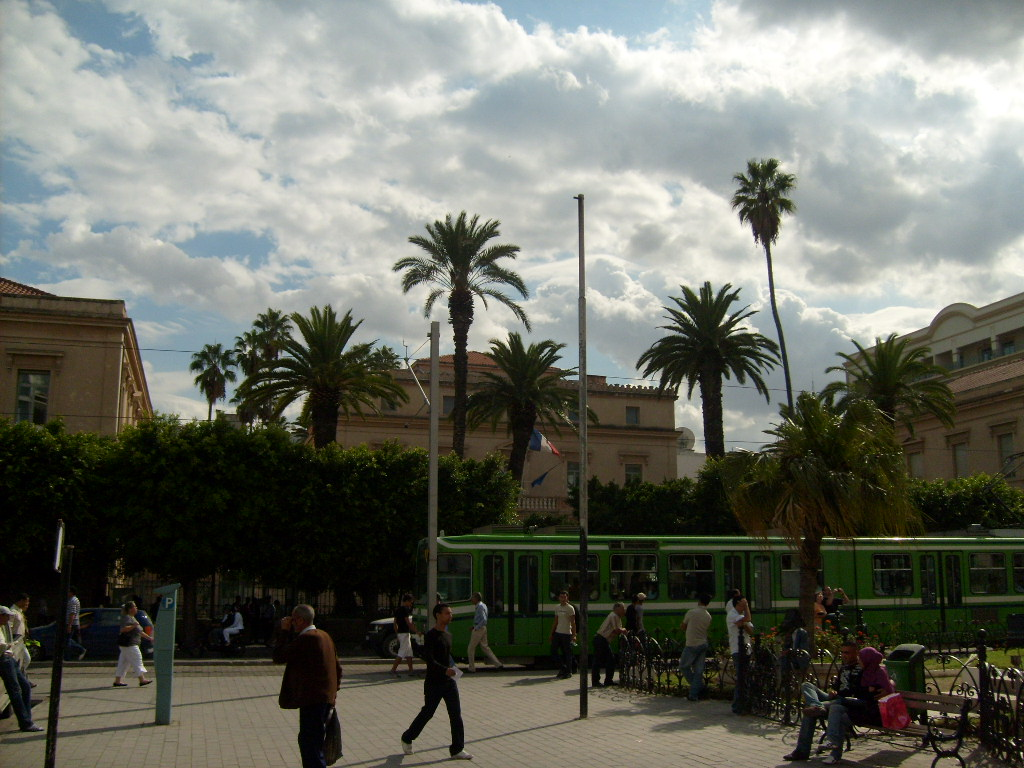
The embassy compound viewed from Avenue Habib Bourguiba

The Embassy of France in Tunis (French: Ambassade de France à Tunis) is France's diplomatic mission to Tunisia.

== History ==
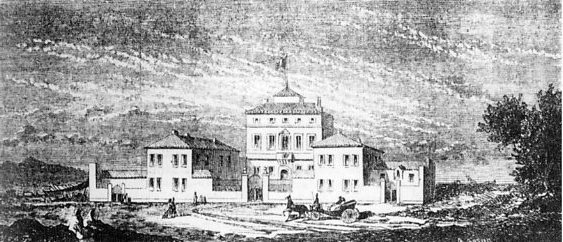
The consulate building in the early 1860s

Léon Roches, French consul general in Tunis from 1855 to 1863, was granted the palatial complex of Dar El Kamila in La Marsa as his residence in 1857. Following an agreement with Bey Muhammad VI al-Habib in December 1859, he directed the construction of a large consulate building on the western approach to the Medina of Tunis, designed by engineer Philippe Caillat and inaugurated on 18 December 1861. At the time, there were few buildings outside of the old city's walls. The new building replaced the older French consulate building inside the Medina, which as of 2017 was still extant albeit in disrepair.

Following the French conquest of Tunisia in 1881, the complex became the seat of the resident-general, the de facto governor of the French protectorate of Tunisia. In the 1890s, the Catholic Cathedral of Saint Vincent de Paul was built across the thoroughfare (now Avenue Habib Bourguiba) from the Residency. In 1904, the two pavilions flanking the entrance were rebuilt on a larger scale, after which the compound's layout has remained largely unchanged.

Following Tunisian independence in 1956, it was repurposed as the Chancery of the newly established embassy. The square in front of the building, formerly known as the Place de la Résidence, was promptly renamed Place de l'Indépendance ("Independence Square").

== See also ==
- People's Palace (Algiers), former residence of the French Governor-General in Algeria
- French Protectorate Residence, Rabat
- List of French residents-general in Tunisia
- History of Tunisia under French rule
- France–Tunisia relations
