= Institut des Hautes Études Marocaines =

The Institut des Hautes Études Marocaines (The Institute of High Moroccan Studies) or IHEM was an institute established in Rabat in 1920 during the French Protectorate over Morocco by the French Résident Général in Morocco Hubert Lyautey. The IHEM was housed in the Bibliothèque Générale near the residence general of the colonial administration.

== History ==
Susan Gilson Miller described the IHEM as the "capstone of Lyautey's efforts as an educational innovator" and "fundamentally an instrument of political control, meant to reinforce through research and teaching the structures of domination imposed by the Protectorate regime." He intended for the institute to serve as a school for training French colonial officials, to acquaint them with the languages, customs, and people of Morocco.

With Lyautey's support, the IHEM published the journal Hespéris—a Greek name for Morocco—which still exists under the name Hespéris-Tamuda. Notable French scholars of the Maghreb such as Evariste Lévi-Provençal, Henri Terrasse, and Louis Brunot served as directors of the institute, while Henry de Castries, Pierre de Cénival, Roger Le Tourneau, and Robert Montagne were among its faculty members.

In the 1920s, the IHEM hosted conferences in which Moroccan scholars, such as the historian Ibn Zaydan and the educator Muhammad al-Hajwi, participated. This Moroccan participation stopped with the tensions of the Rif War. The IHEM was an institution that served European elites; up until World War II, no Muslims had graduated from the IHEM.
