= BRDM-2 =

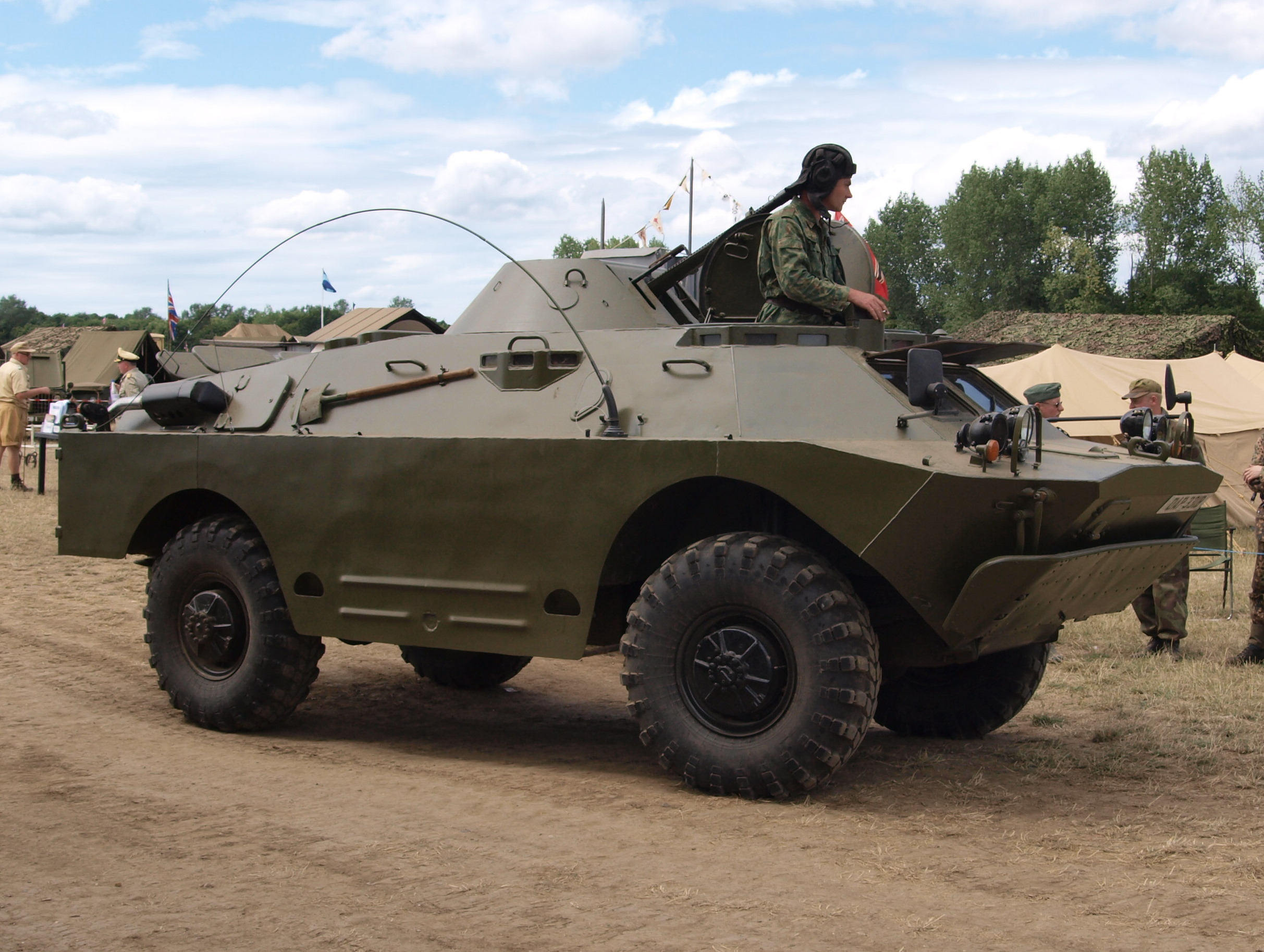
- BRDM-2 at the War and Peace Show 2010 event.
- Type: Amphibious armoured scout car
- Place of origin: Soviet Union

Service history
- In service: 1962–present
- Used by: See § Operators
- Wars: See § Service history

Production history
- Designer: Vsevolod Konstantinovich Rubtsov
- Manufacturer: Gorkovsky Avtomobilny Zavod (GAZ) in Nizhny Novgorod
- Produced: 1962–1989 (in USSR)
- No. built: 7,200
- Variants: See § Variants

Specifications
- Mass: 7 tonnes (7.7 short tons; 6.9 long tons)
- Length: 5.75 m (18 ft 10 in)
- Width: 2.37 m (7 ft 9 in)
- Height: 2.31 m (7 ft 7 in)
- Crew: 4 (driver, commander, radio operator-observer, gunner)
- Armor: Welded steel 10 mm turret front 7 mm turret sides, rear and top 14 mm hull nose plate 5 mm hull, upper front 7 mm hull lower front, sides, rear and top 2 mm hull front floor 3 mm hull rear floor
- Main armament: 14.5 mm KPVT heavy machine gun (500 rounds)
- Secondary armament: 7.62×54mmR PKT coaxial general-purpose machine gun (2,000 rounds)
- Engine: GAZ-41 gasoline V-8; 140 hp (104 kW) at 3,400 rpm
- Power/weight: 18.2 hp/tonne (13.5 kW/tonne)
- Suspension: Wheeled 4x4 (+ 4 auxiliary wheels), leaf springs with hydraulic shock absorbers
- Ground clearance: 430 mm (17 in)
- Fuel capacity: 290 L (64 imp gal; 77 US gal)
- Operational range: 750 km (470 mi)
- Maximum speed: 100 km/h (62 mph) (road); 10 km/h (6.2 mph) (water)

The BRDM-2 (Russian: Боевая Разведывательная Дозорная Машина; Boyevaya Razvedyvatelnaya Dozornaya Mashina, literally "Combat Reconnaissance/Patrol Vehicle") is an amphibious armoured scout car designed and developed in the Soviet Union. It was also known under the designations BTR-40PB, BTR-40P-2, and GAZ 41-08. This vehicle, like many other Soviet designs, has been exported extensively and is in use in at least 38 countries. It was intended to replace the older BRDM-1, and has improved amphibious capabilities and better armament compared to its predecessor.

== History ==
After a few years of use by the Soviet Army, the limitations and drawbacks of the BRDM-1 became obvious. The vehicle had no turret and to operate the armament the gunner had to open a hatch and expose himself to enemy fire. The vehicle was not fitted with an NBC protection system, and had no night vision equipment by default. The vehicle also lacked any kind of special sights, which undermined its function as a reconnaissance vehicle. These drawbacks encouraged the design team to create a new vehicle which would suit the modern battlefield.

== Construction ==
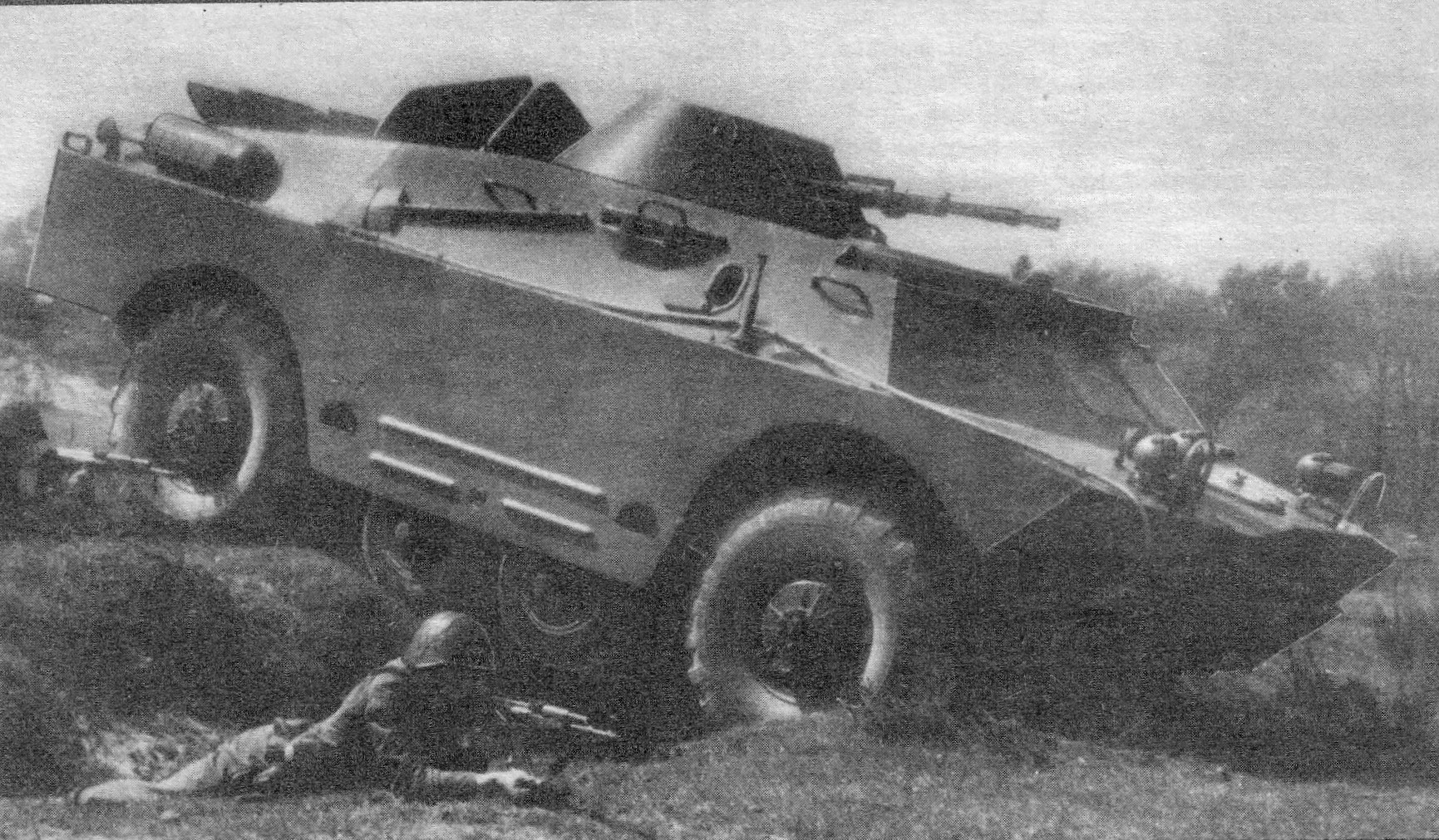
Belly wheels assist with crossing a trench.

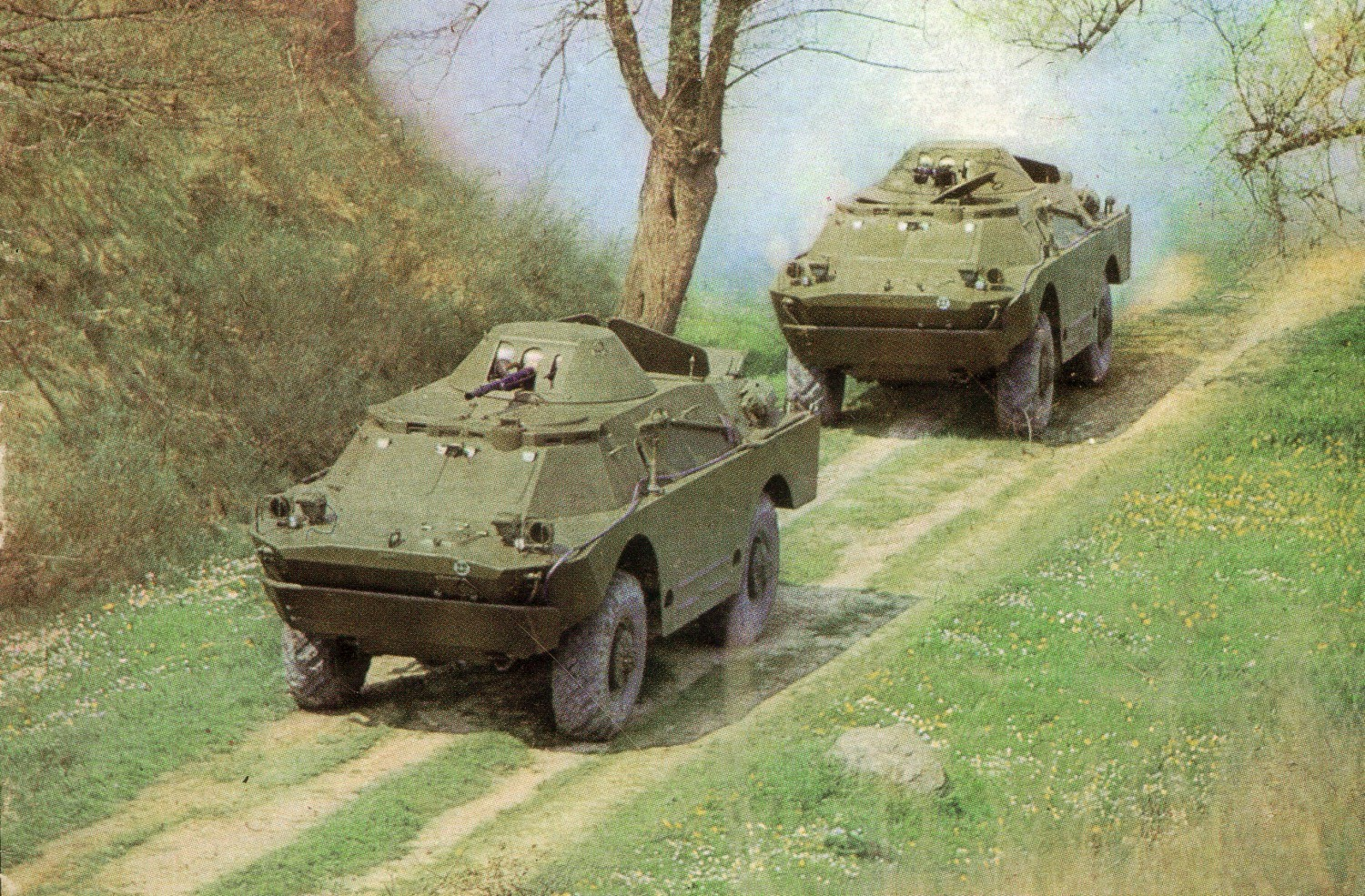
Polish BRDM-2s on the move with shutters over the bulletproof windows.

The BRDM-2 has a crew of four: a driver, a co-driver, a commander, and a gunner. It has two pairs of chain-driven belly wheels lowered by the driver, which allow trench crossing just like its predecessor, and a centralized tire pressure regulation system, which can be used to adjust the tire pressure of all four tires or individual tires while the vehicle is in motion to suit to the ground conditions.

Externally, it differs from the BRDM-1 by having a larger, box-like hull. It retains the boat-like bow of the BRDM-1, alongside its chassis, which in turn is derived from the BTR-40, being based on the chassis of the GAZ-63 from the 1940s and 1960s. However, the crew compartment is now further forward and the new GAZ-41 gasoline V8 engine (which is derived from the one used in the GAZ-13 Chaika limousine) is in the rear. Thanks to this, the engine is much better protected from enemy fire. The engine compartment is also separated from the crew compartment by an armoured barrier.

The driver's and commander's stations are in the front of the vehicle, with the driver positioned on the left and commander on the right. Both of them sit behind a bulletproof windscreen, which provides them with their primary view of the battlefield. When in combat, the windscreen can be additionally protected by twin armoured shutters. When the shutters are in their opened position, they protect the driver and commander from being blinded by the sunlight and ensure that the windscreen won't be blurred by rain or snow. The commander and driver have periscopes allowing both of them a more detailed view of the surrounding terrain. The commander has six TNP-A periscopes (five in the front and one on the side of the vehicle), a TPKU-2B day sight and a TKN-1 night sight (night-vision device). The driver has four TNP-A periscopes (all in the front), one of which can be replaced by a TWN-2B night-vision device. The gunner is in the turret during combat, but when traveling he is seated inside the hull.

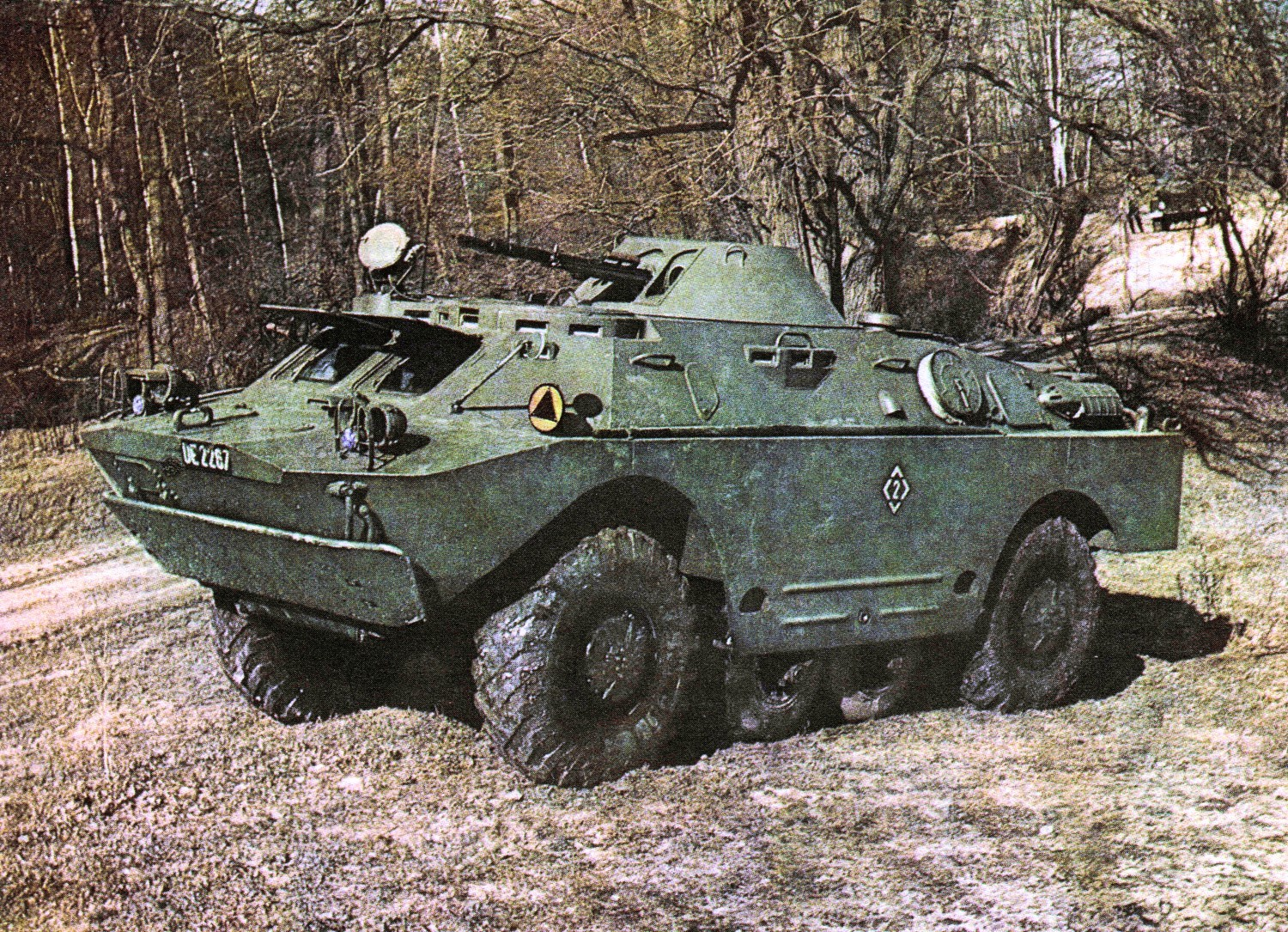
Polish BRDM-2 with the opened shutters, an IR spotlight, side TNP-A periscopes and a trim board in front.

The engine is larger than the BRDM's (it is a 140 hp V-8 instead of a 90 hp 6-cylinder). The BRDM-2 has an IR spotlight and four IR driving lights, as well as an over pressure collective NBC filter system. The IR spotlight is located on top of the commander's periscope. The vehicle also has an R-123 radio and an antenna on the right side of the hull next to the commander's hatch, for communication. There's also a winch mounted internally at the front hull that has a 30 m cable and a 4 tonne capacity. The winch is intended to be used, among others, for self-recovery when stuck in difficult terrain. A spare tire can be mounted on top of the turret. This was most often practiced by Polish crews.

Like its predecessor, the BRDM-2 is amphibious. The GAZ-41 gasoline V-8 engine supplies power to the circular water-jet, equipped with a four-bladed propeller at the rear of the vehicle, which is covered with an armoured shutter while on land. This shutter is opened at the same time as the trim board by hydraulics, which must be done before entering water. The water-jet allows amphibious travel with a speed of 10 km/h for 17 to 19 hours. A trim board, which is stowed under the nose of the hull when traveling, is erected at the front of the hull before entering the water to improve the vehicle's stability and displacement in the water and to prevent the water from flooding the bow of the BRDM-2. While in its traveling position, it serves as additional armour.

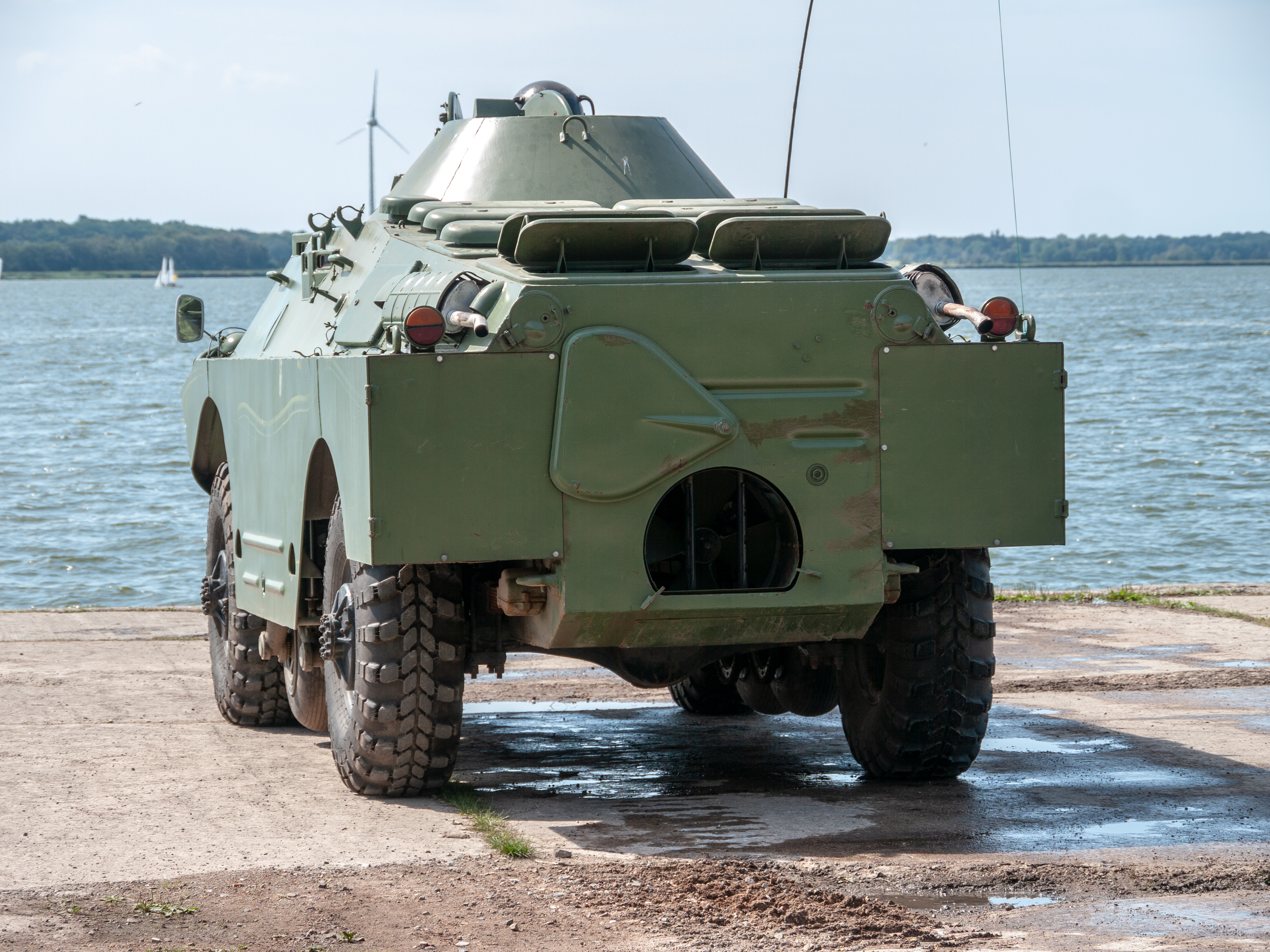
The triangular cover for the water jet on the rear of this ex-East German BRDM-2 has been opened to prepare for water jet propulsion.

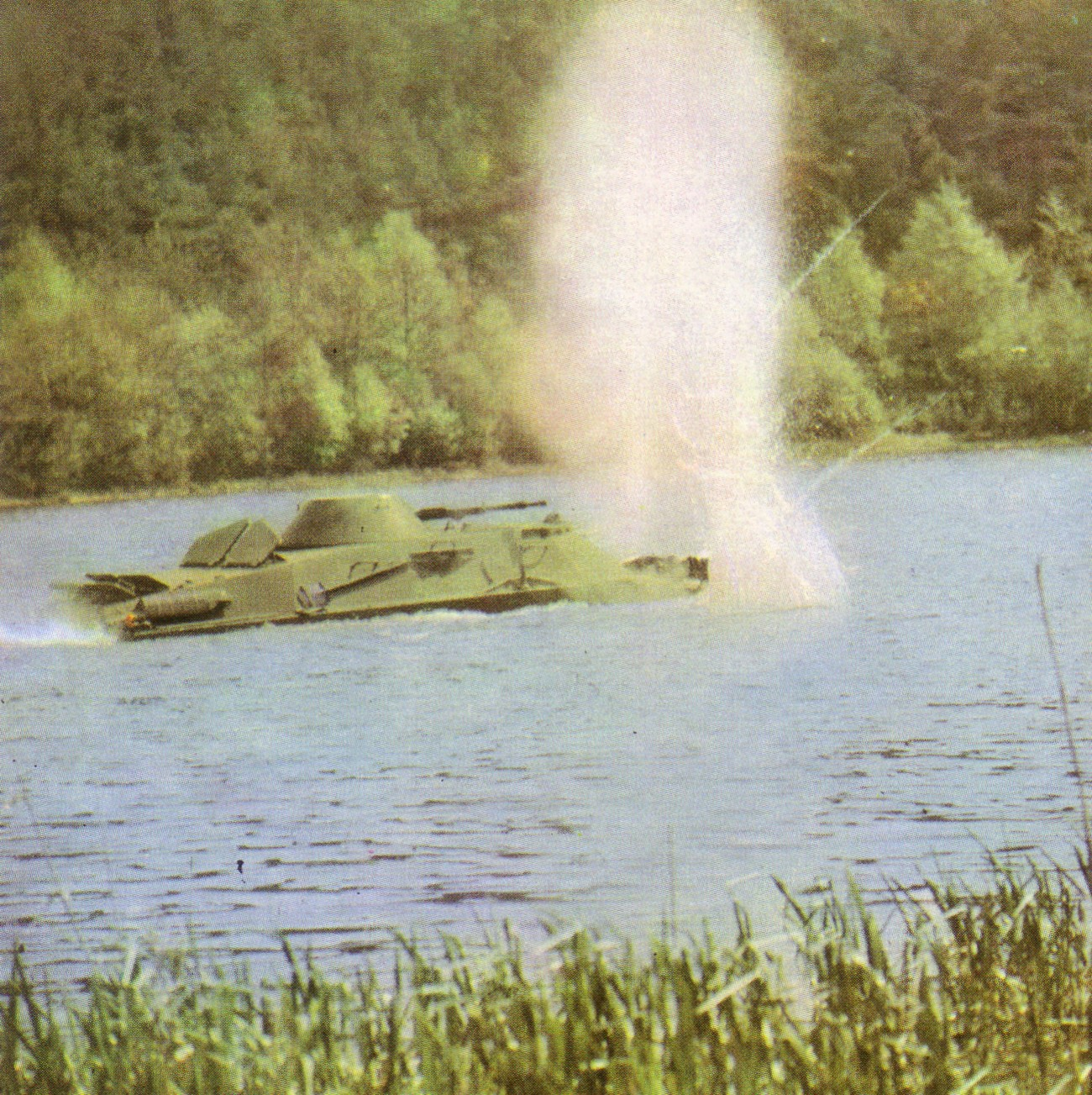
Swimming Polish BRDM-2. Notice the raised trim board in the front of the vehicle and opened air inlets.

=== Armament ===
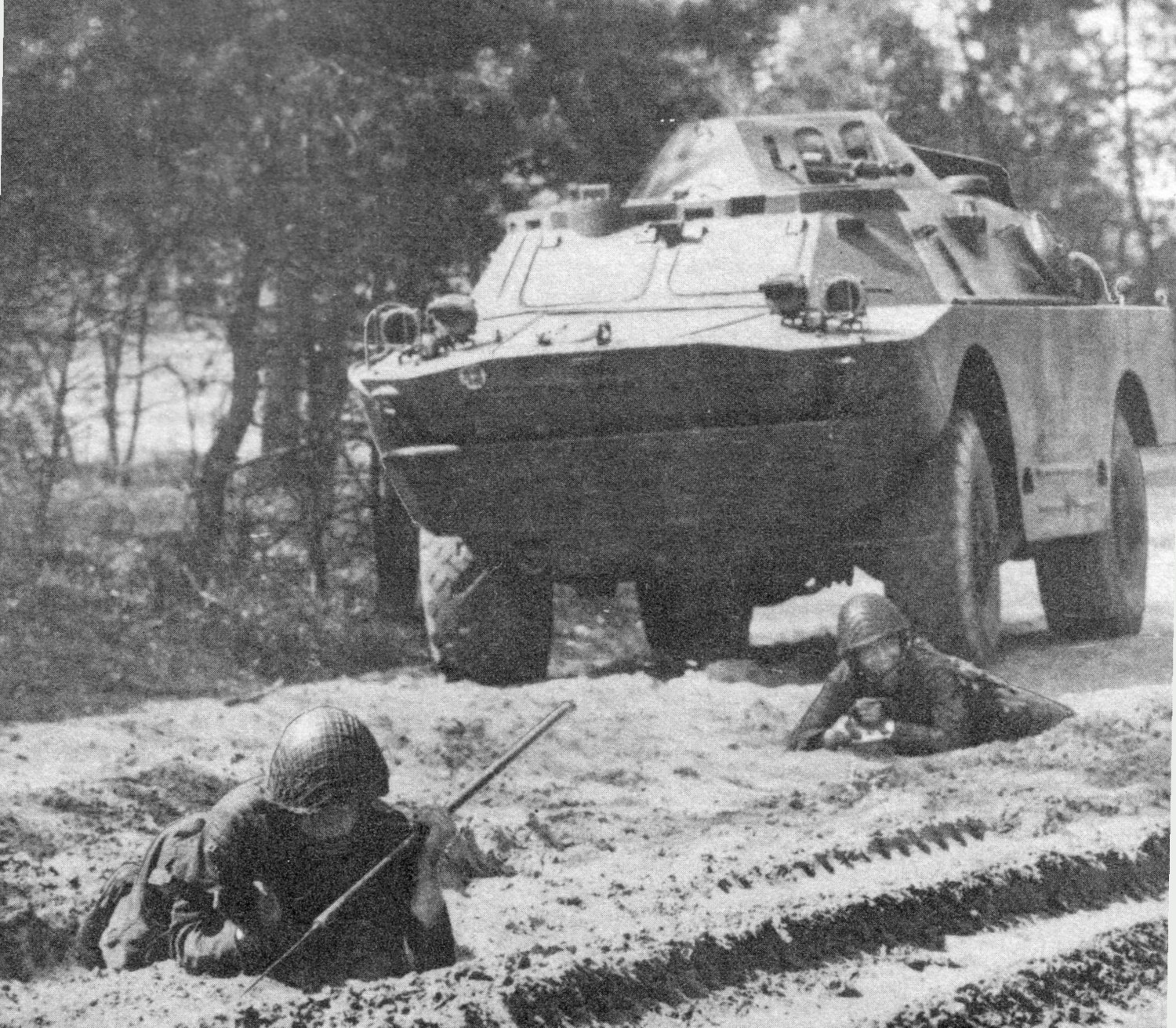
Polish BRDM-2 aiming its machine guns.

The armament is the same as the BTR-60PB armoured personnel carrier; a 14.5 mm KPVT heavy machine gun with a coaxial 7.62 mm PKT general-purpose machine gun as a secondary weapon, both in a small conical BPU-1 turret mounted on the hull in a central position above the belly wheels.

The 14.5 mm KPVT heavy machine gun has a practical rate of fire of 150 rounds per minute and a cyclic rate of fire of 600 rounds per minute. It has an effective range during daylight operations of 2,000 m. It can penetrate 20 mm of armour at a range of 1,000 m and 30 mm of armour at a range of 500 m. It can also fire at air targets, in which case the tactical range is 1,400 m. It uses the 14.5 mm API-T, 14.5 mm I-T, 14.5 mm HE-T, 14.5 mm and MDZ type ammunition.

The 7.62 mm PKT coaxial general-purpose machine gun has an effective range during day time operations of 1,000 m while the vehicle is stationary and from 400 m to 500 m while the vehicle is on the move. It is fired in 2 to 10 round bursts and has a practical rate of fire of 250 rounds per minute and a cyclic rate of fire of 650 rounds per minute. During daylight operations, the gunner uses the PP-61AM sight, which has a field of view of 23 degrees and x2.6 magnification.

The BPU-1 turret is unusual because it has no top hatch opening. Contrary to the popular belief, the BPU-1 turret was originally designed for the BRDM-2. The turret was later used in the Soviet BTR-60PB, the Polish SKOT-2A and the Czechoslovak OT-64A. The turret allows the armament to be elevated between −5 and +30 degrees. On the left side of the turret, there is an air inlet on the hull top. There are also two air-inlet louvers in the forward part of the engine compartment's roof and four smaller air-inlet louvers to the rear. Both sides have centrally placed vision blocks.

The vehicle armor, which is composed of welded steel, is sufficient against small arms fire and small shell fragments; but not enough for protection against big artillery fragments or .50-calibre machine gun fire, which can penetrate the BRDM-2's maximum armor of 14 mm. The BRDM-2's tires are not protected by armour and are particularly vulnerable to puncture from fire of all kinds.

There are three different production lots, which have different cooling vents on the engine deck. The late production version has mushroom-type vents. It also has slightly modified turret and can elevate its armament to +60 degrees. Final production BRDM-2s have additional turret periscopes and a TNA-2 navigation apparatus.

=== Flaws ===
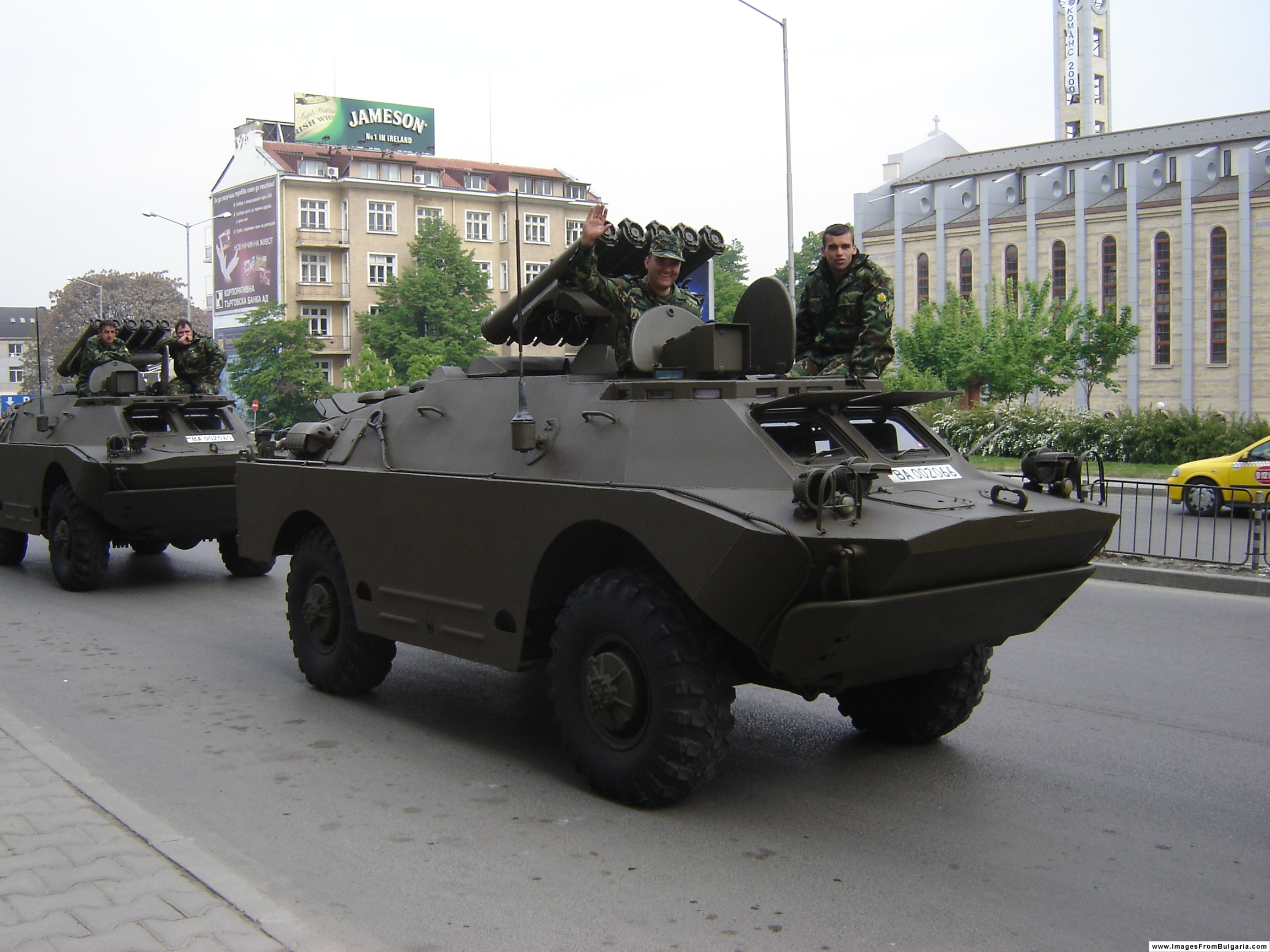
BRDM-2 Anti-tank version.

BRDM-2 has flaws that are also apparent in other Soviet vehicles. These include the poor ergonomic design, low level of crew protection and high fuel consumption. The ergonomics was addressed in the Polish BRDM-2M-96 modernization and its successors, the BRDM-2M-96i, BRDM-2M-96ik "Szakal", BRDM-2M-96ik "Szakal Plus", BRDM-2M-97 "Żbik-B", BRDM-2M-97C "Żbik-P" and BRDM-2M-98 "Żbik-A", which all had the belly wheels removed, thus providing more space for the crew or space for two soldiers. This was also carried out in Morozov's BRDM-2SMD.

The BRDM-2 has a unique flaw. Because the only way in and out of the vehicle is via the front hatches, leaving the vehicle while in combat is almost impossible, as the exiting crew members would instantly enter the line of fire of both the enemy and their own vehicle, as hatches are positioned directly in front of the turret. This shortcoming was addressed in the Polish BRDM-2M-96 modernization and its successors, the BRDM-2M-96i, BRDM-2M-96ik "Szakal", BRDM-2M-96ik "Szakal Plus", BRDM-2M-97 "Żbik-B", BRDM-2M-97C "Żbik-P" and BRDM-2M-98 "Żbik-A", all of which have side hatches. This was also done in the Czech LOT-B and OKV-P as well as the Ukrainian BRDM-2SMD. The Polish BRDM-2M-97 "Żbik-B", BRDM-2M-97C "Żbik-P" and BRDM-2M-98 "Żbik-A" also have a hatch on the top of the turret, giving the crew another way out.

The BRDM-2's predecessor, BRDM-1, did not have that issue as the BRDM-1 obr. 1957 had no roof and later models had a rear hatch that allowed the crew to exit the vehicle from behind. The fact that the BRDM-2 is missing such a hatch is a consequence of putting the engine in the rear, unlike in BRDM-1 where the engine is in the front.

The BRDM-2 is sometimes confused with the Hungarian D-442 FUG and D-944 PSzH amphibious scout cars, which also have rear-mounted engines. What distinguishes them from the BRDM-2 is that they have twin waterjets, whereas the BRDM-2 has a single triangular water jet.

== Service history ==
=== Soviet Union and Russia ===
The BRDM-2 entered service with the Soviet Army in 1962. It was first publicly shown in 1966. It replaced the BRDM-1 in the Soviet and Warsaw Pact armies. Production started in 1962 and went on until 1989, with 7,200 vehicles produced (mostly for export).

The BRDM-2 became famous for being the vehicle selected to pull the Soviet leader Leonid Brezhnev's coffin during the funeral ceremony in the Red Square.

Both Russian and Ukrainian sides used the BRDM-2 during the Russian invasion of Ukraine, however by that time, very few BRDM-2 armored scout cars were spotted in service with the Russian army. These armored scout cars were generally replaced in Russian Army service by Tigr armored vehicles. During the Russian invasion of Ukraine, at least one captured Ukrainian BRDM-2L1 was modified with a UB-32 (rocket pod).

=== Poland ===
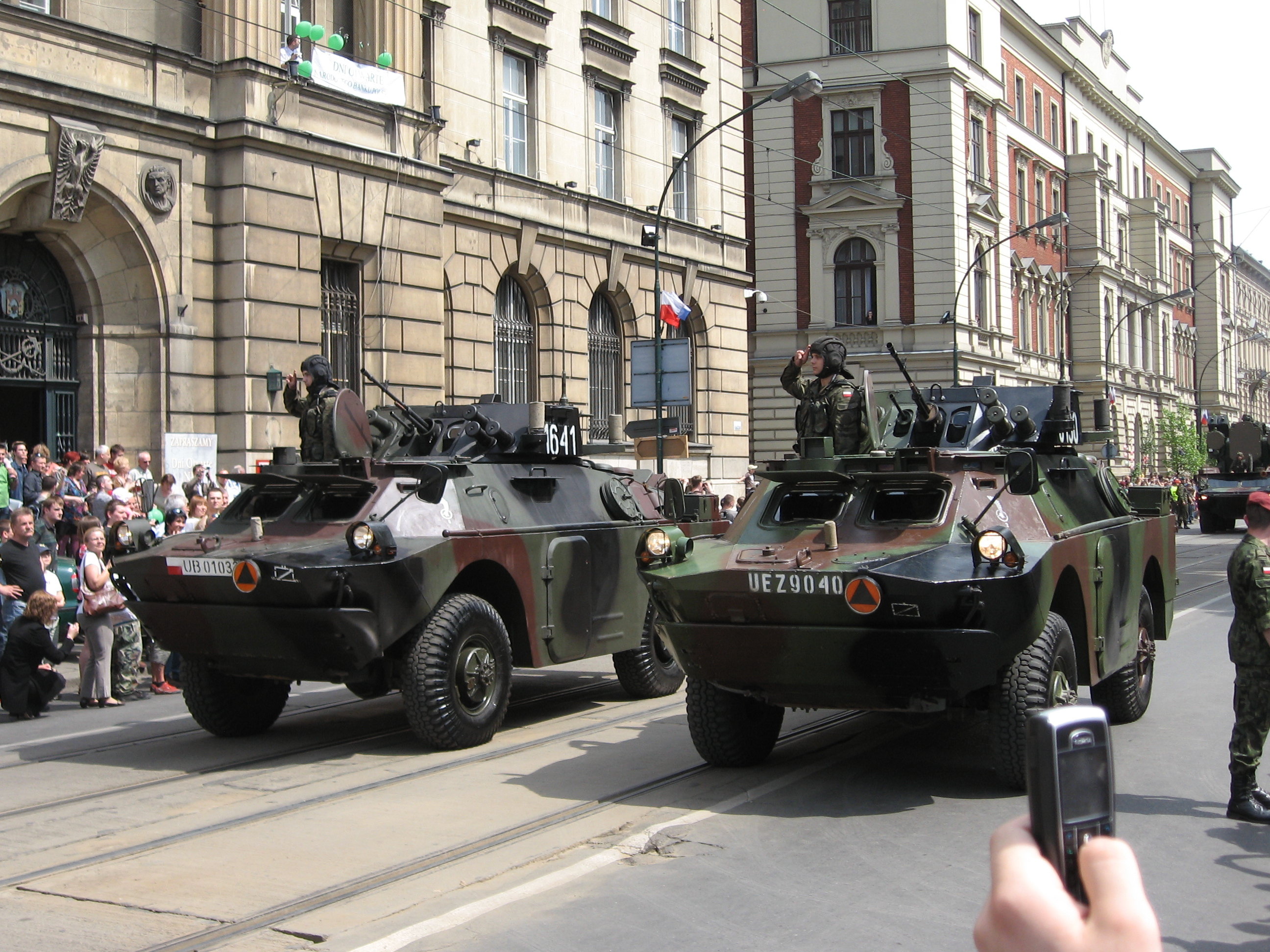
Two BRDM-2M-97 "Żbik-B" armoured scout cars on a military parade in Kraków, 17 May 2008.

Poland bought 450 BRDM-2 armoured scout cars, 418 9P133 "Malyutka" and 9P148 "Konkurs" tank destroyers and 32 BRDM-2RS NBC reconnaissance vehicles in 1965. Later, Poland obtained some 9P31 Surface-to-air missile launchers. In 2004, the Polish Army operated 600 BRDM-2 armoured scout cars and vehicles based on it. Currently, the Polish Army operates 200 BRDM-2s, 120 BRDM-2s modernized to BRDM-2M-96, BRDM-2M-96i, BRDM-2M-97 "Żbik-B" and BRDM-2M-98 "Żbik-A" level, 12 BRDM-2s modernized to BRDM-2M-96ik "Szakal" level, 100 9P133 "Malyutka" and 18 9P148 "Konkurs" tank destroyers, 12 BRDM-2RS NBC reconnaissance vehicles, an unknown number of 9K31 Strela-1 self-propelled surface-to-air missile launchers as well as BRDM-2 R-1A and BRDM-2 R-5 command vehicles. Also one BRDM-2 was modernized to BRDM-2M-96ik "Szakal Plus" level. All modernizations, conversions and serious repairs of Polish BRDM-2s are done by WZM in Siemianowice Śląskie. Modernized BRDM-2 armoured scout cars will serve with the Polish Army for at least a couple of years. The 9P133 "Malyutka" and 9P148 "Konkurs" tank destroyers, which are the basic equipment of anti-tank subunits of motorized brigades, are considered obsolete and therefore are to be replaced with ATGM launchers based on lighter vehicles, like the HMMWV, or heavier vehicles like the KTO Ryś APC or KTO Rosomak AMV.

For MSPO 2002, two Polish BRDM-2M-96i were converted into a fire unit and command vehicle with a radar of the German Rheinmetall Defence Electronics ASRAD-R missile air defense system. The system won the "Defender" award at that year's event.

Polish BRDM-2M-96ik "Szakal" was shown at the Land Combat Expo 2004.

Two BRDM-2M-97 "Żbik-B" armoured scout cars took part in a military parade in Kraków on 17 May 2008. Seven BRDM-2M-97 "Żbik-B" armoured scout cars and six 9P148 "Konkurs" tank destroyers took part in a military parade in Warsaw on the Polish Army Day, 15 August 2008.

BRDM-2, BRDM-2M-96 and BRDM-2M-96i armoured cars were used by Polish units of SFOR. Polish KFOR units also use BRDM-2M-96 armoured scout cars and BRDM-2RS NBC reconnaissance vehicles. Polish Forces in Iraq operated 12 BRDM-2M-96ik "Szakal" and 14 BRDM-2M-97 "Żbik-B". 10 BRDM-2M-96ik were used by Polish forces of ISAF. However, these are now back in Poland, as are the 12 vehicles used in Iraq.

=== Estonia ===
Around 10 BRDM-2s were taken over from the Soviet Army in the early 1990s. They were mostly used during infantry training for posing as the enemy armour. Also, the Estonian police used a specially modified BRDM-2 (See the Estonia section in the Variants section). All BRDM-2s have now been withdrawn from both the military and police service.

=== Ukraine ===
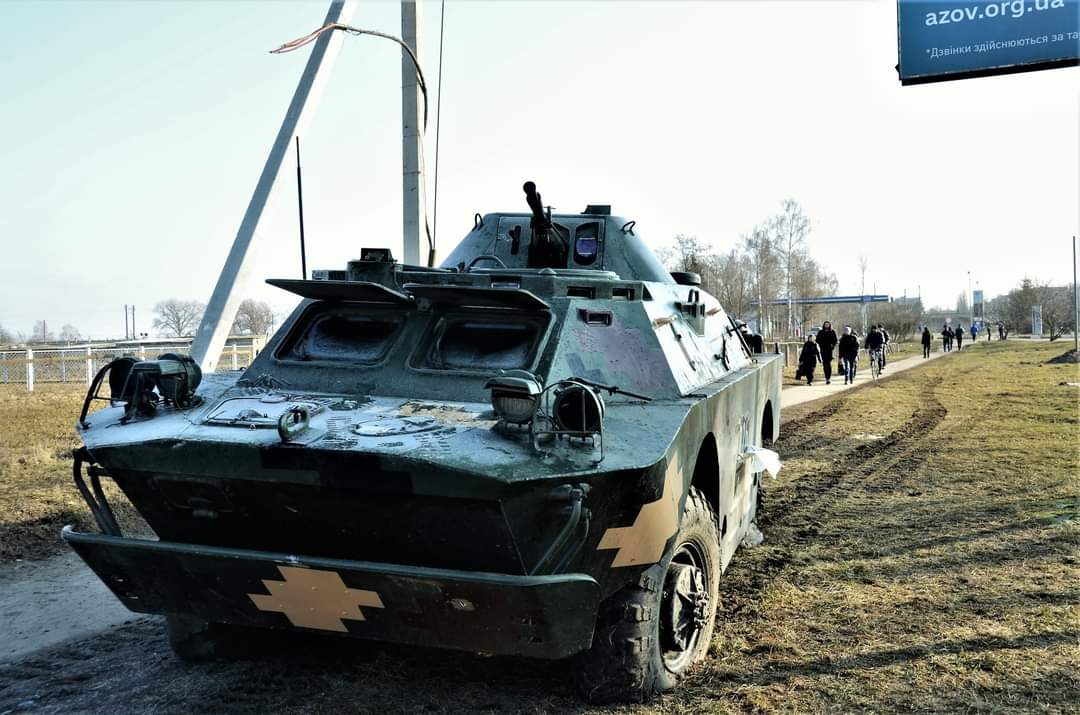
Knocked out Ukrainian BRDM-2 at Konotop, 25 February 2022.

In the Russo-Ukrainian War, the BRDM-2 and several of its variants were used by both sides. On the morning of 13 June 2014, during the First Battle of Mariupol, the Azov Battalion, Dnipro-1 Battalion and the National Guard of Ukraine retook the city and key buildings occupied by insurrectionists killing five militants and destroying an insurrectionist BRDM-2 armoured vehicle. BRDM-2s also saw action during the Russian invasion of Ukraine, primarily on the Ukrainian side. As of January 23rd 2026 the open source intelligence website Oryx reports 18 BRDM-2s lost on the Russian side, and 164 for the Ukrainians.

=== Syria ===
Syria received hundreds of BRDM-2, as well as specialized variants, BRDM-2 RKh (radiological-chemical recce), 9P122, 9P148 (both anti-tank missile carriers) and 9K31 Strela-1 (SAM version). BRDM-2 and 9P122s saw widespread service against Israel during the 1973 Kippur War. Israel managed to capture enough of them to use them with its own forces. Therefore, during the 1982 Lebanon War, both Israelis and Syrians deployed BRDM-2s. The Syrian Armed Forces used the BRDM-2s for security patrols during the Lebanon Civil War, the light vehicles proving themselves very suitable for this type of operation.

At the beginning of the 2010s, the BRDM-2s, thought to be unsuitable to modern combat against Israeli forces, were retired from service. They were mostly used as riot control vehicle during the 2011 protests that led to the Syrian Civil War. During this war, the BRDM-2s or 9P148s were rarely seen in action, most of the usage being local initiatives of governmental or rebel units. A few were modified by the Islamic State into VBIEDs. The Kurdish YPG, lacking armor, used all the vehicles they could including at least two BRDM-2s.

=== Other operators ===
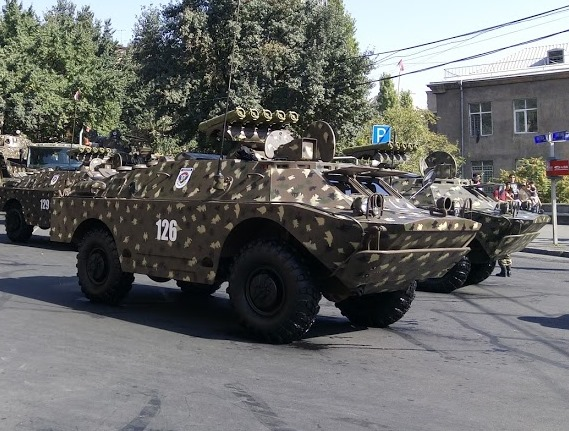
Armenian 9P148 Konkurs based on BRDM-2 during military parade in Yerevan.

Like all Soviet equipment, the BRDM-2 was also sold to many Arab and African countries. It is used by 38 armies. The BRDM-2 has enjoyed popularity on the export market because it was cheap, easy to operate and reliable. These factors made the BRDM-2 a more popular export reconnaissance vehicle than the BRM-1K, which was much more expensive and complicated to operate. Two BRDM-2s were sold to Grenada and were lost in the Invasion of Grenada. One was destroyed in an engagement with American M60 Pattons and the second was captured.

When the Soviet forces left Afghanistan, they abandoned many BRDM-2s. These vehicles, together with some derelict ones restored back to working state, are now used by the Afghan Taliban. The BRDM-2 also saw service with the Iraqi Army during the First Gulf War and the 2003 invasion of Iraq.

The Soviet Union began supplying the People's Armed Forces for the Liberation of Angola (FAPLA) with BRDM-2s shortly after Angolan independence. At least one fell victim to a rebel Panhard AML-90 crewed by South African advisers during Operation Savannah.

BRDM-2 armoured scout cars were used by the Yugoslav People's Army (JNA) during the Ten-Day War as well as the initial operations in Croatia during the Croatian War of Independence. The BRDM-2 was also used by the Yugoslav Army (VJ) against the KLA during the Kosovo war. BRDM-2 armoured scout cars are used by Polish, Ukrainian and Russian units of the Kosovo Force.

The Sudanese Armed Forces used several BRDM-2s during the Sudanese conflict in South Kordofan and Blue Nile and at least 2 were captured by the Sudan People's Liberation Movement-North in December 2012.

=== List of conflicts ===
- 1966–1990: South African Border War (FAPLA)
- 1973: Yom Kippur War (Egypt and Syria)
- 1975–1991: Western Sahara War (Polisario)
- 1979–1989: Soviet-Afghan War (Soviet Union and Afghanistan)
- 1980–1988: Iran-Iraq War (Iran and Iraq)
- 1982 Lebanon War (Syria)
- 1983: United States invasion of Grenada (Grenada)
- 1991–2001: Yugoslav Wars
  - 1991: Ten-Day War (Yugoslavia)
  - 1991–1995: Croatian War of Independence
  - 1991–1995: Bosnian War
  - 1998–1999: Kosovo War
- 1990–1991: Gulf War (Iraq)
- 1992: Transnistrian War
- 1992–1993: War in Abkhazia (1992–1993) (Georgia and Abkhazia)
- 1994–1996: First Chechen War (Russia and Chechnya)
- 1999–2001: Second Chechen War (Russia)
- 2001–2021: War in Afghanistan
- 2003–2011: Iraq War (Iraq, Bulgaria and Ukraine)
- 2005–present: Fatah-Hamas conflict
- 2011–2024: Syrian Civil War (Syrian government forces, rebels, ISIS and YPG)
- 2011–2020: Sudanese conflict in South Kordofan and Blue Nile (Sudan)
- 2014–present: Russo-Ukrainian War
  - 2014–2022: War in Donbas (Russia, Donetsk People's Republic, Luhansk People's Republic and Ukraine)
  - 2022–present: Russian invasion of Ukraine (Russia, Donetsk People's Republic, Luhansk People's Republic and Ukraine)

== Variants ==
Like the BRDM, the BRDM-2 exists in several versions.

=== Soviet Union ===
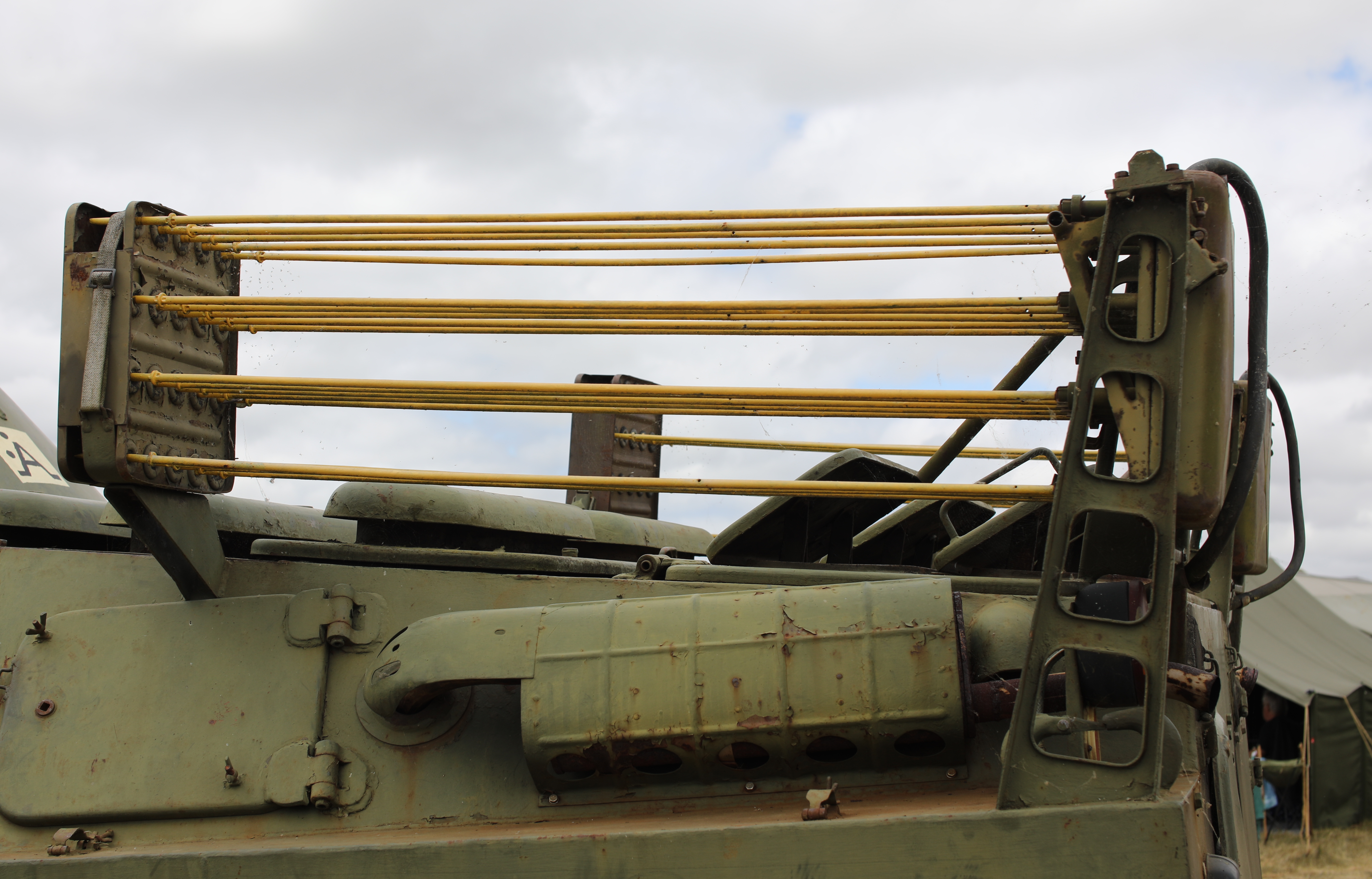
Warning pole deployer on BRDM-2RKh.

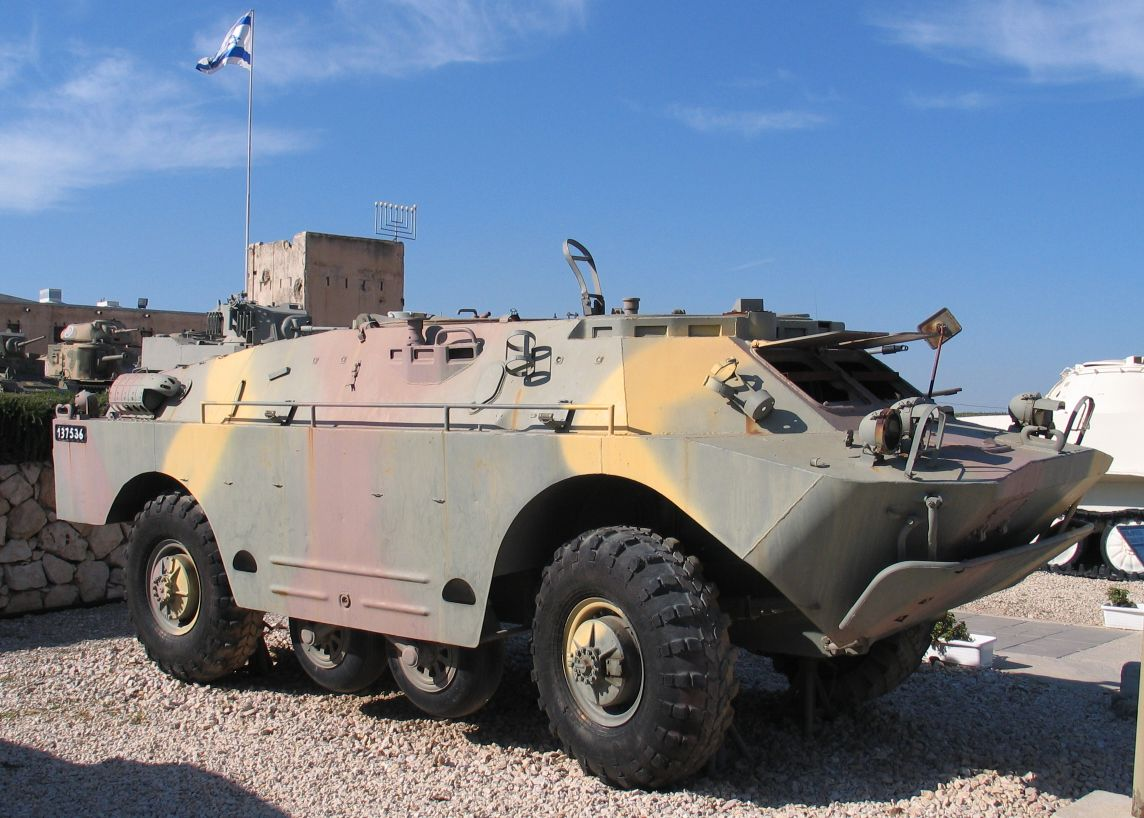
BRDM-2UM in Yad La-Shiryon Museum, Israel, 2005.

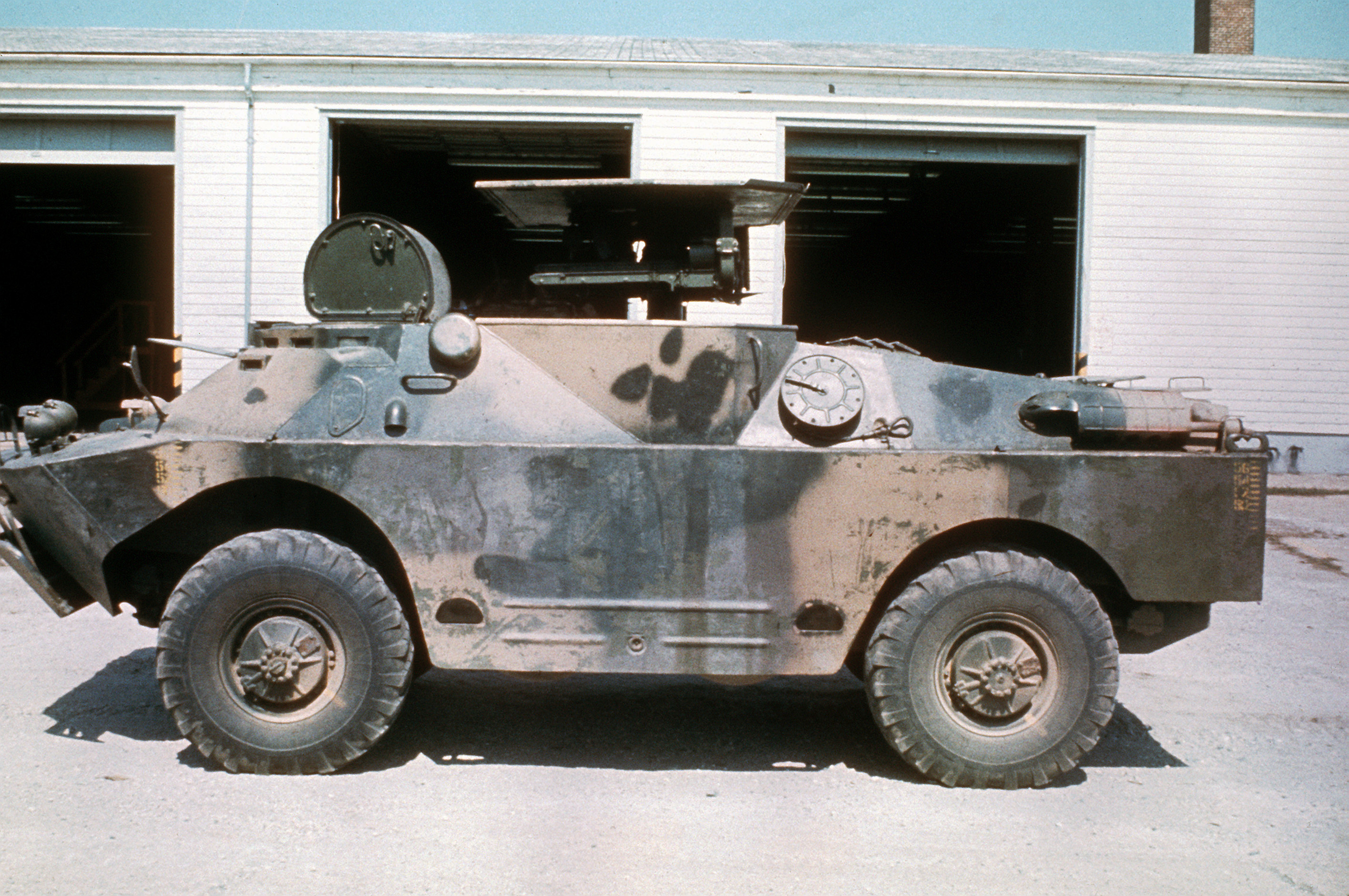
9P122 "Malyutka" tank destroyer vehicle with raised launcher rack for 6 9M14M "Malyutka-M" anti-tank guided missiles.

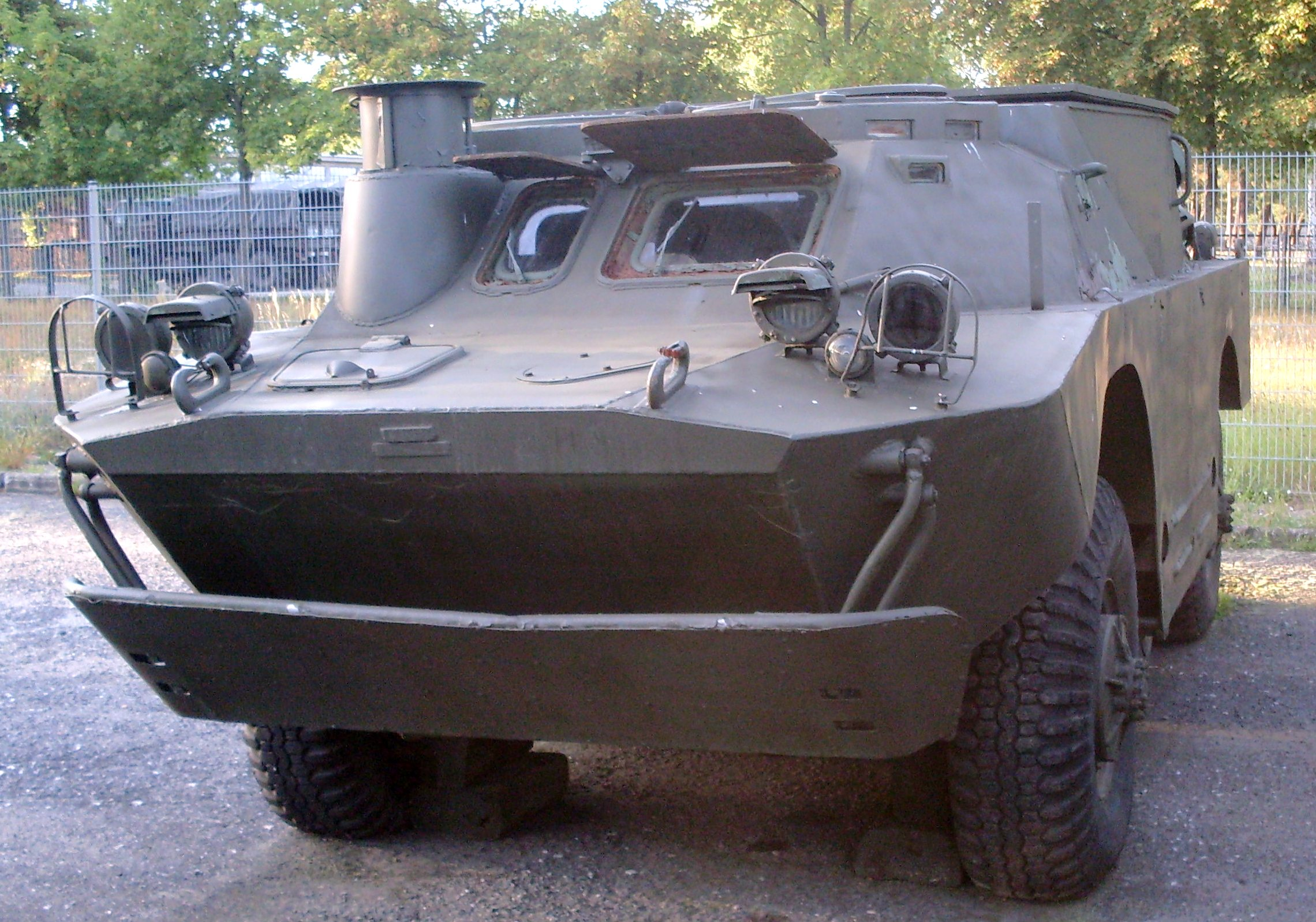
Polish 9P133 at the Centrum Tradycji Polskich Wojsk Pancernych in Żagań, Poland.

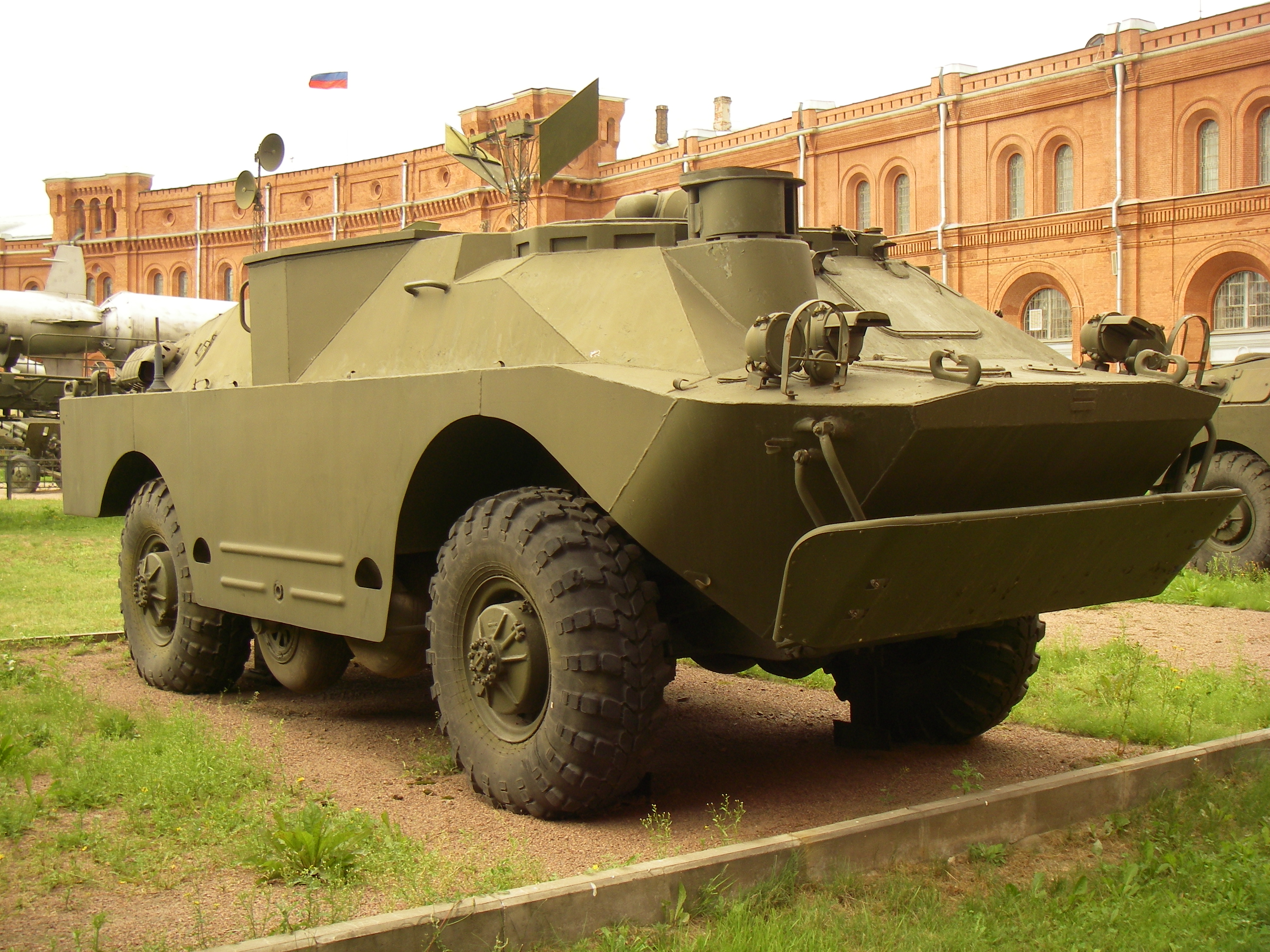
9P137 "Flejta" in Saint Petersburg Artillery Museum.

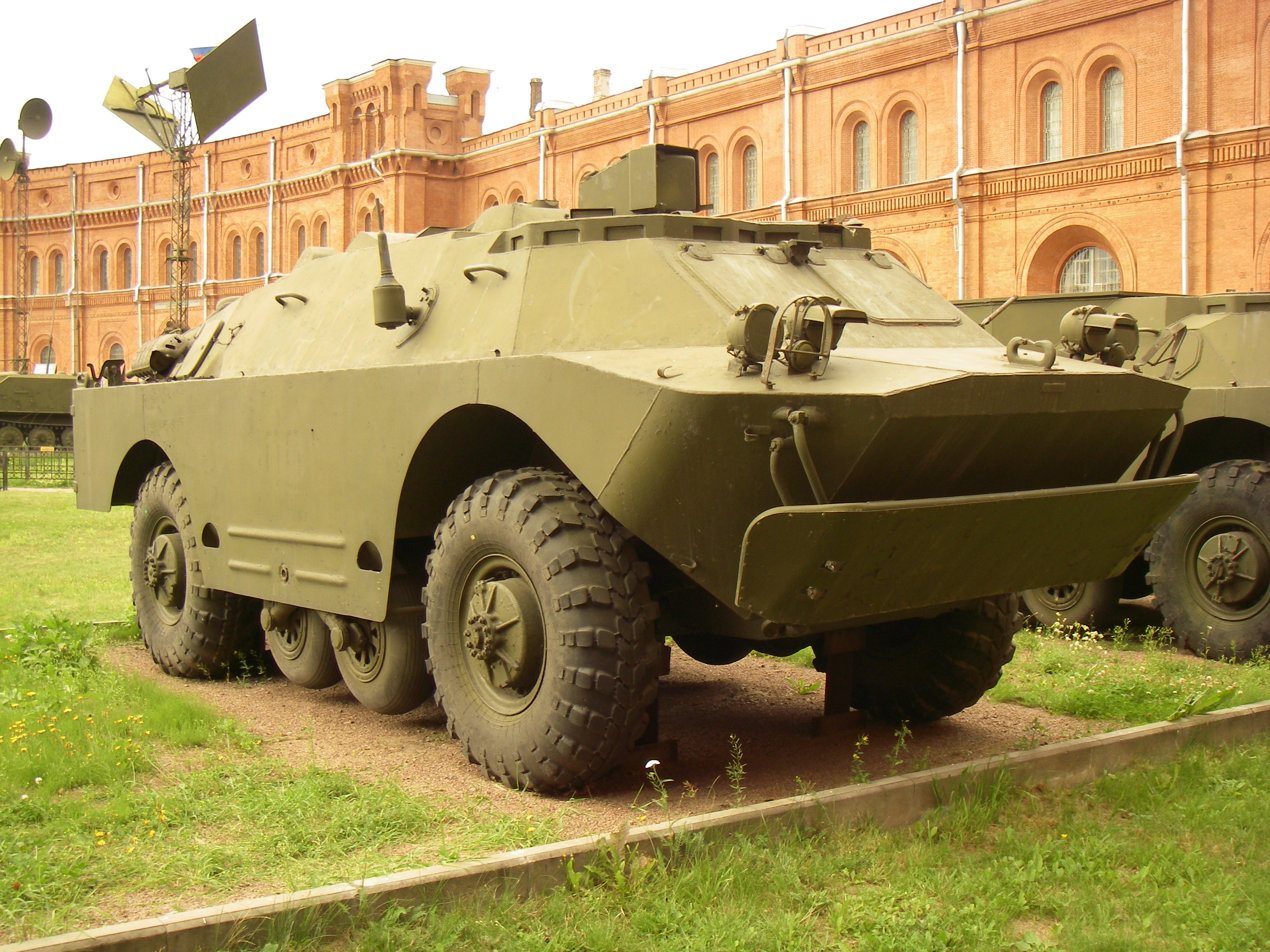
9P148 "Konkurs" in Saint Petersburg Artillery Museum.

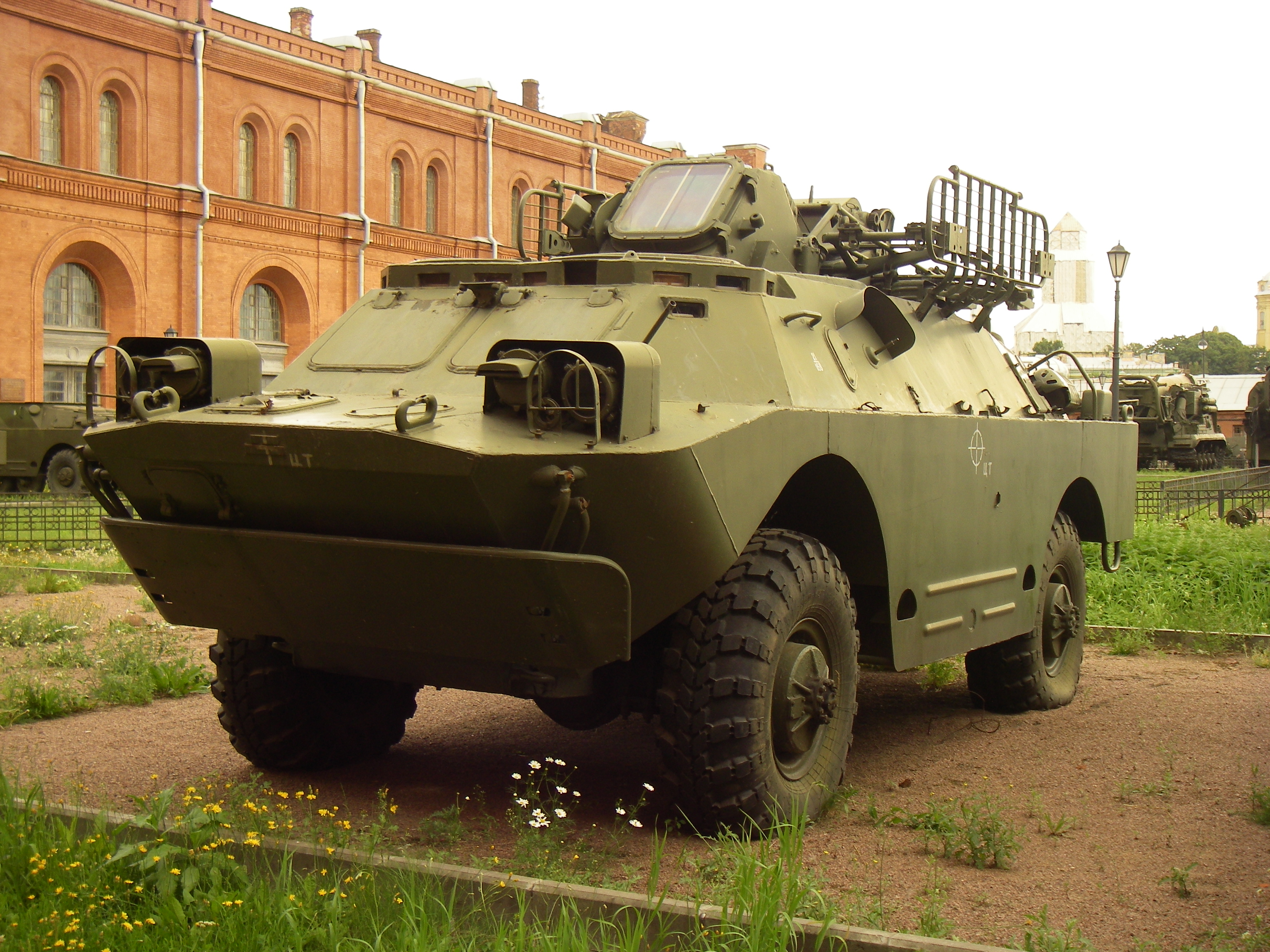
9P31 Strela-1 in Saint Petersburg Artillery Museum.

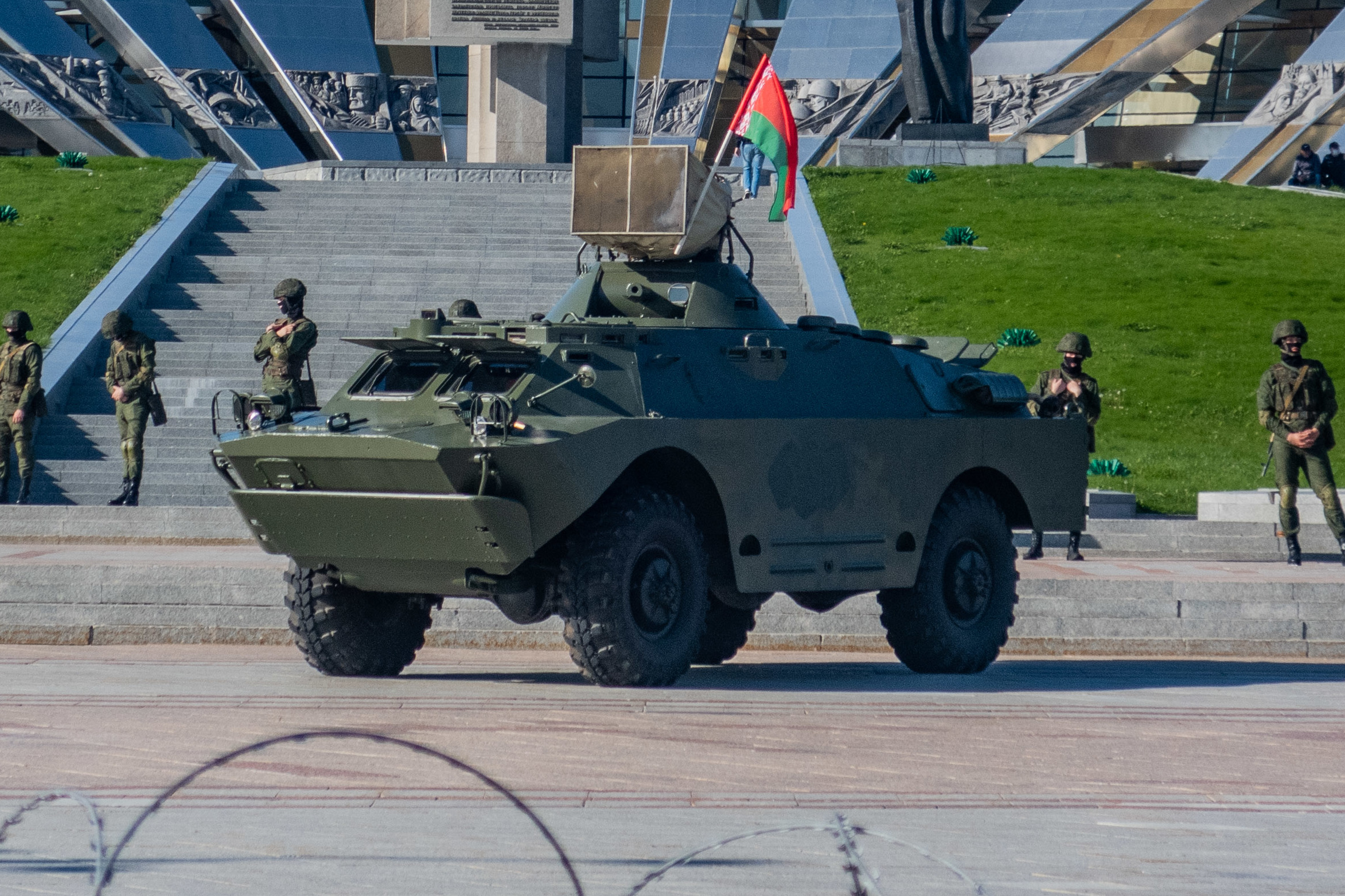
ZS-82 PsyOps vehicle (loudspeaker) in Minsk during 2020–21 Belarusian protests.

- BRDM-2 – basic reconnaissance vehicle, distinguished by its turret, which is the same as that mounted on the BTR-60PB. The conical turret, which mounts two machine guns (14.5 mm and 7.62 mm), is unusual in that it has no top hatch opening. This model carries a crew of four: the commander, the gunner, the driver, and the co-gunner. It also has a land navigation system that gives co-ordinate readings. Late Production version had mushroom-type vents on top of engine compartment. Final production model had two additional turret periscopes, one on top of turret and the other one on the left hand side of the turret and a TNA-2 navigation apparatus. It was also known under designations BTR-40PB, BTR-40P-2 and GAZ 41-08.
  - BRDM-2 without the 14.5 mm KPVT heavy machine gun.
  - BRDM-2RKh (khimicheskaya razvedivatel'naya mashina) – radiological-chemical reconnaissance vehicle with two KZO-2 rectangular dispensers for emplacing warning poles and flags around contaminated areas. The pole/flag dispensers are located on the rear corners of the vehicle's hull. The dispensers are normally covered with canvas and when required are positioned vertically over the rear of the vehicle. The specialized equipment consist of an automatic gas detector GSA-12, a dosimeter DP-5V, a Geiger counter DP-3B, decontamination apparatus DK-4K and semi-automatic detection devices PPKhR and VPKhR. The vehicle retains the original armament. The regimental chemical defence platoon and the divisional-level chemical defence company use it, as does the divisional reconnaissance battalion. It was also known under designations BRDM-2RKhA, BTR-40P-2RKh and BTR-40PB-RKh.
    - BRDM-2RKhb – improved model that can also be used for biological reconnaissance, thanks to specialised equipment including the DP-5B Geiger counter and biological aerosol detector ASP. BRDM-2RKhb doesn't have the firing ports. This model has twin 7.62 mm PKT general-purpose machine guns instead of the 14.5 mm KPVT heavy machine gun and 7.62 mm PKT coaxial general-purpose machine gun and usually carries only one KZO-2 dispenser. It was also known under designation BRDM-2RKhB.
  - BRDM-2UM (mashina upravleniya) – command vehicle without turret; however, it carries a 1 kW generator and extra radios (two R-123 and an R-107, or according to other sources one R-105M, one R-108M and one R-130M). On either side of the upper hull there is a big antenna base. Contrary to general Western belief, this is actually a very rare vehicle primarily built for export.
  - 9P122 "Malyutka" – ATGM launcher vehicle with 6 9M14M "Malyutka-M" (AT-3B Sagger B) missiles on an elevatable mount with overhead cover. A total of 14 missiles are carried on board. This model is found in regimental and divisional anti-tank units of MRDs, the anti-tank regiments of combined arms armies (CAA), and in the anti-tank regiment or brigade in the artillery division of a front. It has a crew of 2.
    - 9P133 "Malyutka" – this is an improved model with bigger sight 9S446 instead of the original 9S414. The 9P133 can launch the more capable 9M14P "Malyutka-P" (AT-3C Sagger C) and 9M14P1 missiles of which it carries from 16 to 18. It uses SACLOS guidance system. The vehicle also has additional windscreen on the front between the drivers windscreen and the sight mounting.
  - 9P124 – ATGM carrier vehicle with 4 radio-guided 9M17M "Skorpion-M" (AT-2B Swatter B) AT missiles on an elevatable mount with overhead cover. In the hull are four more missiles. It uses MCLOS guidance system. The 9P124 has a crew of 2. It was also known under designation BRDM-3.
    - 9P137 "Flejta" – improved model that uses the 9K8 "Flejta" system which allows usage of 9M19P ATGMs with SACLOS instead of MCLOS guidance. The launcher has 5 rails instead of 4.
  - 9P148 "Konkurs" – ATGM launcher vehicle with 5 wire-guided 9M113 "Konkurs" (AT-5 Spandrel). The AT-5 launcher can also fire the 9M111 "Fagot" (AT-4 Spigot) missile. The early production model of 9P148 could only fire 9M113 "Konkurs". The crew reloads the launcher through a small hatch located behind it. The gunner controls the missiles through a sight mounted on the front right of the vehicle. The 9P148 can carry a total of 10 9M111 and 10 9M113 or 14 9M113. From 1996 some Russian 9P148 were fitted with an improved 1PN66 day/night thermal sight. In the West, it was also known under the incorrect designation BRDM-3.
    - 9P148 "Konkurs" with the whip antenna mount fitted to the right hand side pistol port. This is the standard production model.
  - 9P31 – launcher vehicle for the 9M31 surface-to-air missile, belonging to the 9K31 Strela-1 (NATO: SA-9 "Gaskin") vehicle-mounted low-altitude SAM system. The SAM launching system with quadruple canister replaces the machine gun turret on top of the vehicle, it is capable of 360 degrees traverse and limited elevation. It is lowered for travel. The vehicle doesn't have the belly wheels. The vehicle carries 8 missiles. The crew went down to three (commander, driver and gunner).
    - 9P31 with resupply racks on the upper sides of the hull.
    - 9P31 fitted with the passive radar detection system 9S12 (FLAT BOX A) and three sensors mounted around the carrier vehicle (one next to the launcher, one on the centre of engine deck and one between windscreens), giving it 360-degree coverage. This system emits no radar energy but can detect radio waves emitted from aircraft, giving the vehicle warning about incoming aircraft and aiding in the acquisition of the target aircraft with the optical system. Typical tactics call for the launch of two missiles against each target to improve the chance of destroying it.
  - ZS-82 (zvukoveshchatel'naya stantsiya) – PsyOps vehicle with a large box speaker array on top of an unarmed turret.
  - TM-1 – BRDM-2 armoured scout car converted into a fire and rescue vehicle. It has visual warning device on top of the unarmed turret.
  - ATM-1 "Ingul" – civilianised emergency transport vehicle without turret.

=== Afghanistan ===
- BRDM-2 converted into an improvised fire support vehicle with a complete 57 mm rocket pod and pylon from aircraft or helicopter mounted upside down on the turret roof. Improvized by Alexander Metla in 1987.

=== Azerbaijan ===
- Azerbaijan's Ministry of Defense led the effort for a local variant of BRDM-2 that is named ZKDM. The layout of the vehicle was completely modified compared to the old BRDM-2, the small windows are removed and the front of the hull is fitted with new armour. The driver is seated at the front of the hull on the left with the vehicle commander to his right. The top of the hull is fitted with two roof hatches immediately behind the commander and driver. One single door is available on each side of the hull. provided by the removal of the small tires on the sides of the vehicle. The single water-jet at the rear of the hull is removed. The gasoline engine of the BRDM2 is replaced with a new diesel engine D-245.30E2 developing 150 hp to increase the maximum road speed of the vehicle to 100 km/h. The ZKDM uses technology of V-hull to increase vehicle and crew survivability by deflecting an upward directed blast from a landmine (or Improvised Explosive Device) away from the vehicle. The body of the ZKDM provides protection level B-32 against armor-piercing incendiary full metal jacket round with a hardened steel core. The ZKDM has a total weight of 7,300 kg with a crew of three, including commander, driver and gunner. The ZKDM is fitted with a new turret armed with a double-barrel, 23 mm GSh-23 cannon, one 7.62 mm PKT machine gun, one 30 mm AGS-17 grenade launchers, four 57 or 80 mm rocket launchers and two smoke grenade launchers mounted on each side of the vehicle. The turret is remotely controlled by the gunner and fitted with fire control system. The weapons have an elevation of +15º, a depression of −30º and the turret can be traversed through a full 360º. Standard equipment of the ZKDM includes BPK-2-42-day/night sight, a TV vision system with a maximum range of 1,000 m, and GPS navigation system GLONASS.

=== Belarus ===
- Alesiya – Modified BRDM-2 for civilian usage as an amphibious armoured truck.
- BRDM-2MB1 – Upgraded BRDM-2 with new diesel engine D245.30E2 of 155 hp for a range of 900 km. The conversion is carried out by the 140th Repair Plant in Borisov.
- Cayman – Upgraded BRDM-2 with no turret. Entered service in 2017. It has been exported to Ivory Coast and Angola. The vehicle is powered by a D-245.30E2 diesel engine, which produces a maximum road speed of 110 km/h, a maximum swimming speed of 8 km/h, and a road cruise range of up to 1,000 km. The ARV can carry a Kalashnikov 7.62 mm medium machinegun, NSVT Utyos 12.7 mm heavy machinegun (HMG), AGS-17 30 mm automatic grenade launcher, Adunok remote-controlled weapon station with an Utyos HMG, or a communications suite. Belarusian sources say the vehicle has been made from scratch. Its combat weight is 8.5 tons.

=== Bosnia and Herzegovina ===
- BRDM-2 based tank destroyers converted into APCs.

=== Cuba ===
- BRDM-2 converted into a mortar platform. It was recently developed by Cuba. The turret has been removed and a M-38/43 120 mm mortar has been mounted in the modified crew compartment. Three large boxes with ammunition and equipment are located behind the roof opening. Cuban Special Forces Black Wasp (Cuban Special Forces) use the regular BRDM-2 and many of them were seen together with a Cuban made MRAP in the military parade of 2011.

=== Czech Republic ===
- LOT-B or BRDM-2/99 (lehký kolový obrněný transportér) – Upgraded model with Renault DCI 4C turbocharged diesel engine with power of 162 hp (121 kW), side hatches, slat-type armour over vision ports, a new NBC protection system, GPS, boxed-in exhausts, six MB smoke grenade dischargers, reworked turret with square extrusion on side, new day/night vision devices and an NSVT 12.7 mm heavy machine gun. The vehicle does not have the belly wheels. The vehicle also has a small radio antenna on the left hand side of the hull, next to the driver's hatch. It is also known as BRDM-2NG.
  - LOT-VR (velitelská verze) – Command version of the LOT-B with additional signals equipment and a generator.

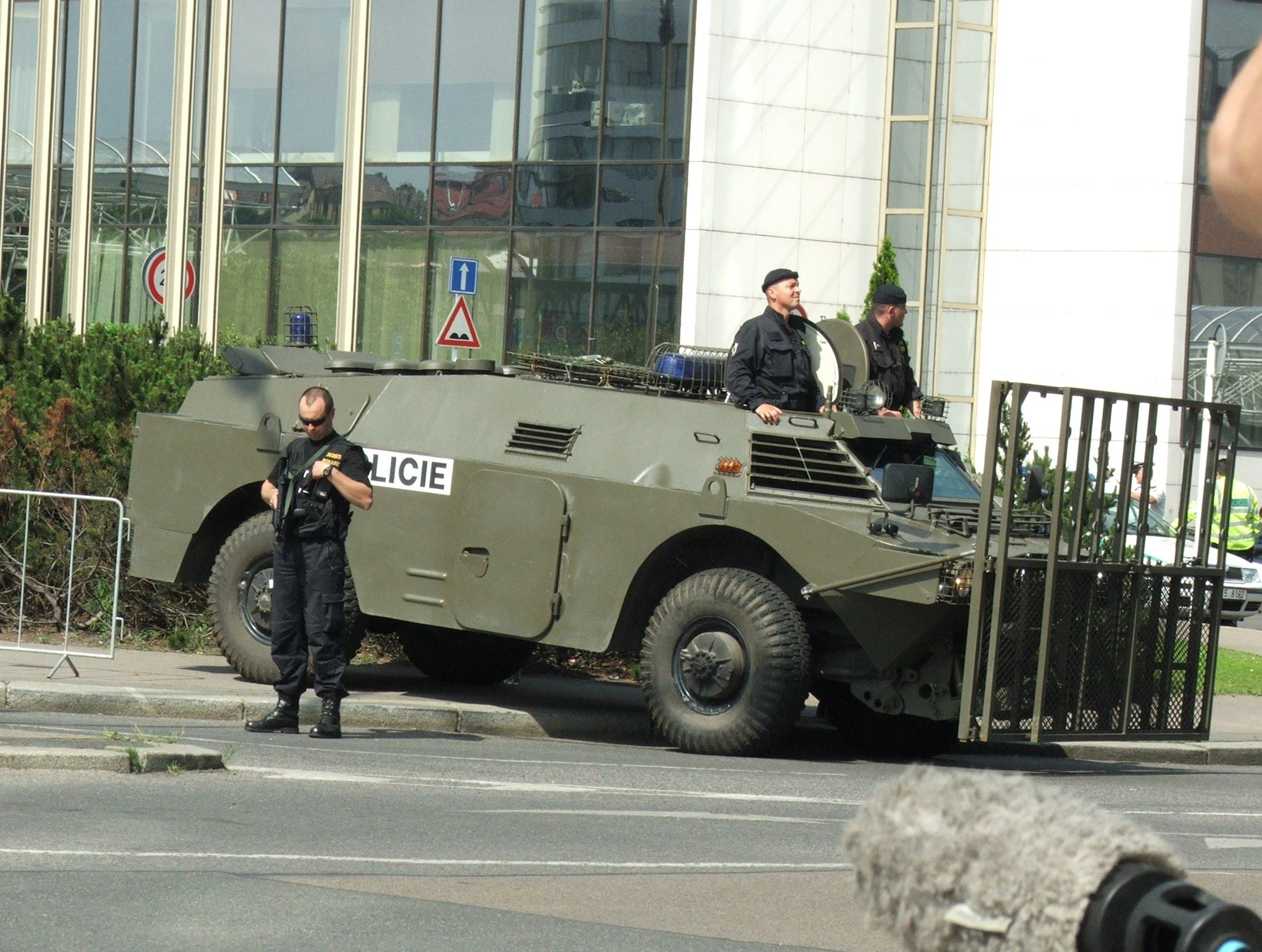
Czech OKV-P police armoured car in Prague during the visit of US president George W. Bush, June 2007.

- OKV-P (obrněné kolové vozidlo pro policii) – Police variant with a turret replaced by a spare wheel and a hatch next to it. It also has side hatches on each side of the hull, bigger armoured windows, police lighting array mounted on the roof, large front bumper with a registration plate, inset head, side and big turn lights, four side observation devices with slotted grills, two on the either side of the hull over the side hatches and two in the front corners of the hull with rear view mirrors in front of them, additional light on the roof, small turn lights on each side of the hull and boxed in exhaust on the left-hand side of the hull's rear.
- BRDM-2RKhb with removed armament from the turret.
- BRDM-2ch – Czech improved BRDM-2RKhb used by radiological and chemical reconnaissance teams. It carriers among other equipment the GSP-11 or GSP-12 Automatic Chemical Agent Detector Alarm, CHP-79 Chemical Agent Detector, IT-65 or DP-86 Radiation Meter, R-123 Radio, KPO-1 Area Marking System and MK-3 Area Marking System. The original armament was replaced with a single 7.62 mm PKT coaxial general-purpose machine gun.

=== Estonia ===
- BRDM-2 Politsei – BRDM-2 modified for usage by Estonian Police. The armament has been removed and a police lighting array was placed on top of the turret along with a cover. The firing ports also have been removed. There's also an IR spotlight on top of the turret. There are two periscopes in the left side of the turret. The vehicle has two rear view mirrors. Withdrawn from service.

=== East Germany ===
- SPW-40P2 (Schützenpanzerwagen) – NVA designator for BRDM-2. It was also known under designation SPW BRDM-2.
  - SPW-40P2(K) – locally developed command version with telescopic mast. It was used by commanders of reconnaissance platoons and companies.
  - SPW-40P2 M/F – signals vehicle with R-123MT radio and TNA-3 navigation system.
  - SPW-40P2 (Ch) – NVA designator for BRDM-2Rkh.
  - SPW-40P2UM – NVA designator for BRDM-2UM.
    - SPW-40P2UM fitted with 2x4 mechanical launcher systems for the FLG 5000 illuminating rockets that were operated from within the vehicle. Only one vehicle was modified in 1987.
    - SPW-40P2UM fitted with 2x5 mechanical launcher systems for the FLG 5000 illuminating rockets that were operated from outside the vehicle. Only one vehicle was modified in 1987.

=== Georgia ===
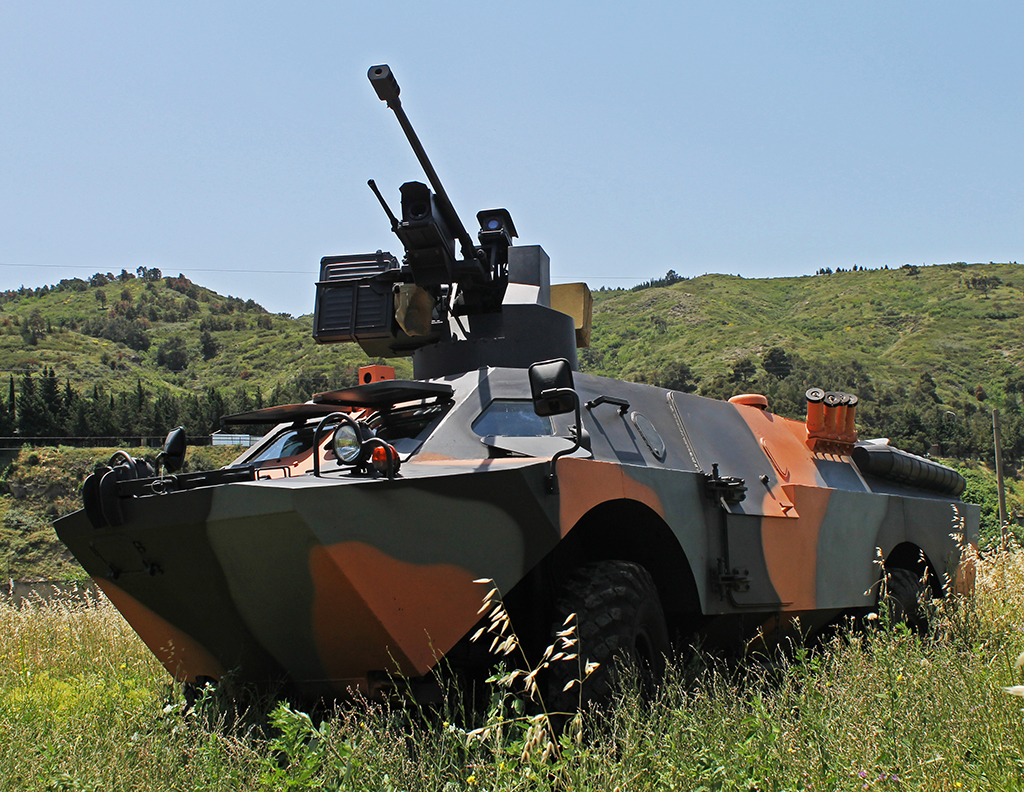
Georgian modernised BRDM-2, 2014 with additional hatches, side doors, wire cutter and automated weapon system.

- BRDM-2 – Modernized version created by STC Delta with the addition of front-mounted day and night vision camera, remote controlled weapon station DRWS-2, enhanced armor, front-mounted foldable wire-cutting knife, and on each side a door and a 4–4 smoke discharger. Furthermore, the engine is enhanced and the window layout modified. The vehicle can be used for surveillance, and also as a base for various armament.

=== Iraq ===
- BRDM-2 armed with 23 mm gun with top handle and cylindrical flash eliminator instead of 14.5 mm KPV heavy machine gun and a 7.62 mm PKT coaxial general-purpose machine gun. It was intended to be used for fire support.
- BRDM-2 armed with ZPU-2 twin 14.5 mm antiaircraft heavy machine guns instead of a turret. Also the hull has been stretched. Its intended to be used for fire support and air defense. This vehicle is used by the New Iraqi Army.

=== Israel ===
- BRDM-2 converted into an ATGM launcher vehicle with its turret replaced by a pintle mount for a TOW-type ATGM launcher.

=== Hungary ===
- BRDM-2 armoured scout car with two rear view mirrors. Used by Hungarian unit of ISAF.
- VS BRDM-2 (vegyi sugárfelderítö úszó gépkocsi) – NBC reconnaissance vehicle. The initial model with the large flat box on top of the engine deck is no longer in service. The current model is very similar to the BRDM-2RKhb, but has a square metal flag dispenser on the right rear. Specialised equipment consists of detection and analysing equipment MK-67P, DS-10, Gid-3, IH-95 and TMF-2.

=== North Korea ===
- M1992 – armored personnel carrier influenced by the BRDM-2. Developed in the late 1980s and first observed in 1992. The M1992 has a crew of two and can carry six troops. It is armed with an AGS-17 grenade launcher and AT-4 Spigot ATGM.

=== Poland ===
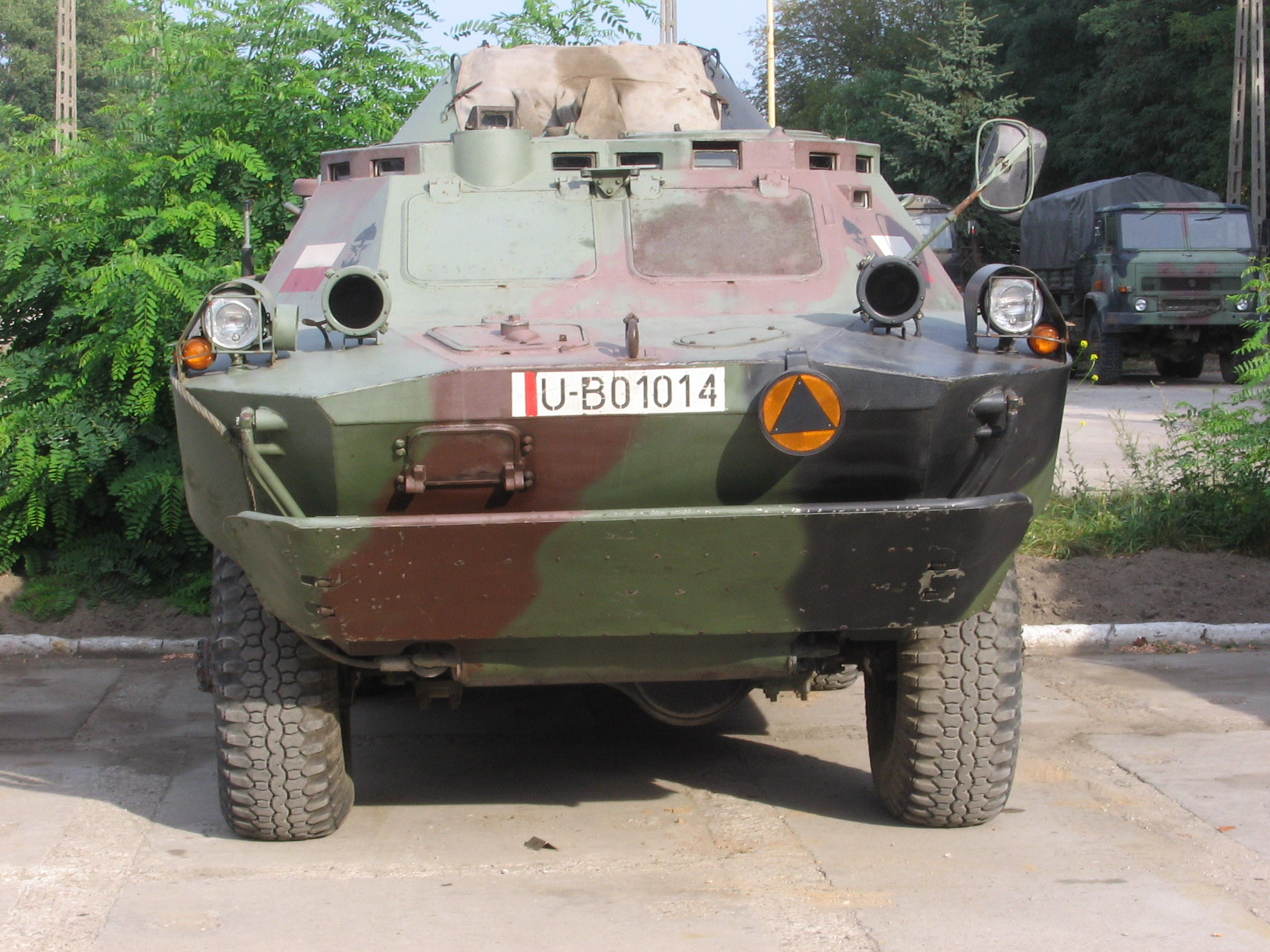
BRDM-2M-96i with removed armament and without the right rear view mirror.

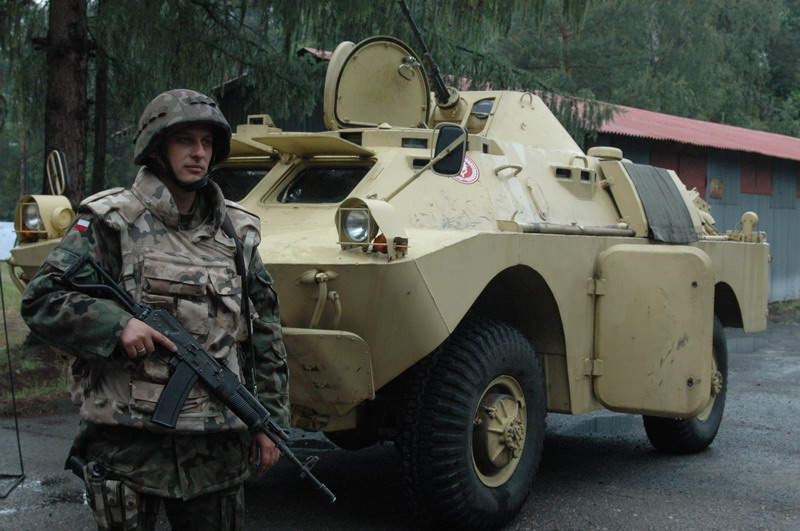
BRDM-2M-96ik "Szakal".

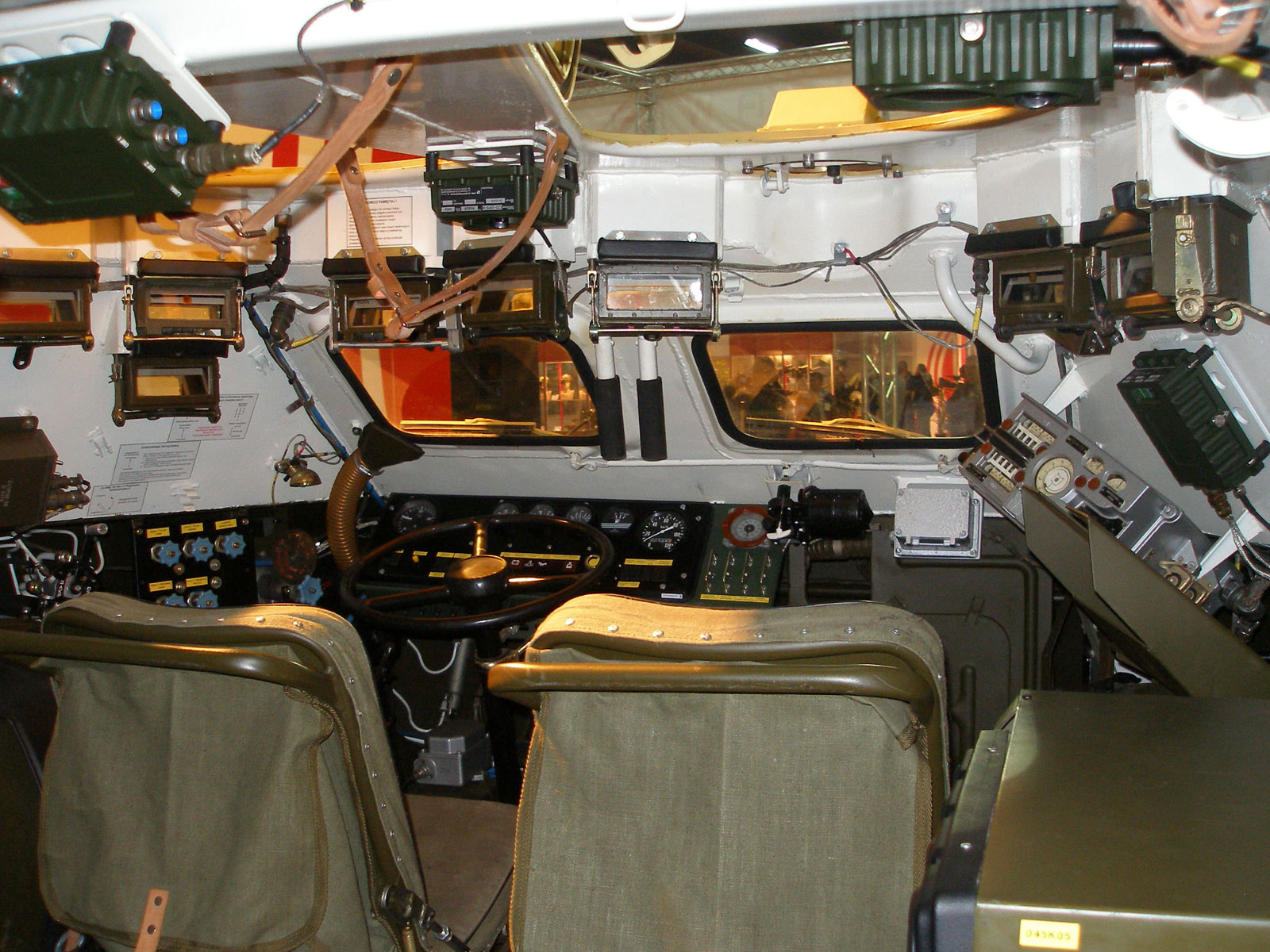
Interior of BRDM-2M-96ik "Szakal".

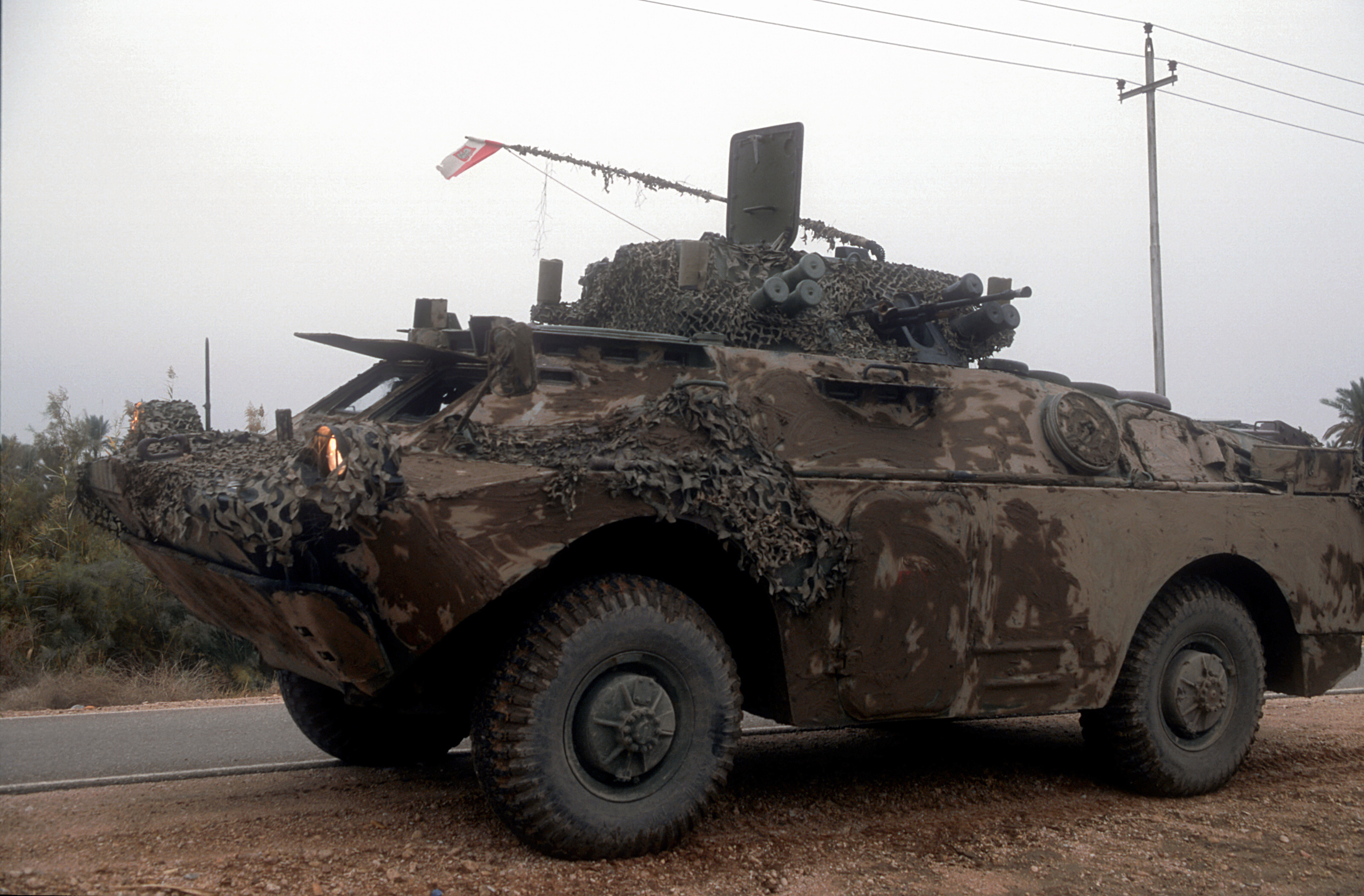
BRDM-2M-97 "Żbik-B", 1999.

- BRDM-2RS – Polish designation for BRDM-2RKhb.
- BRDM-2 fitted with an IR spotlight in the front of the turret. It was used by Polish unit of SFOR.
- BRDM-2M-96 – The BRDM-2's cramped crew compartment was a major concern for Polish crews. To address this, the WKMech design team removed the belly wheels and redesigned the vehicle's floor, creating additional space for the crew or accommodating two additional soldiers who could dismount for reconnaissance, reducing the risk of ambushes. To improve access, side doors were added to the hull for rapid entry and exit. The BRDM-2M-96 is equipped with an upgraded PNK-72 night vision device for the driver, replacing the original TWN-2B system, which is used during nighttime operations instead of the TNP-A day sight. The commander has a POD-72 day/night sight, providing a 360-degree field of view from his cupola. Additional upgrades include new seating, an advanced heater for the engine and crew compartment, GPS, and improved communication equipment, notably the Sotas internal communication system. A spare wheel can also be mounted at the rear of the hull for auxiliary use. This variant was developed in 1996. Used by Polish Kosovo Force units.
  - BRDM-2M-96 fitted with an IR spotlight in the front of the turret. It was used by Polish unit of SFOR.
  - BRDM-2M-96 fitted with an IR spotlight in the front of the turret and small IR spotlight over the armament. Used by Polish unit of KFOR.
  - BRDM-2M-96i – BRDM-2M-96 with the Iveco Aifo 8040 6-cylinder diesel engine which develops 165 hp (123 kW). It also has new stowage arrangements, two-circuit brake system, 24V electrical system, two rear view mirrors on both sides of the hull and additional protection for its headlights. Designed in 1997.
    - BRDM-2M-96i fitted with an IR spotlight in the front of the turret. It was used by Polish unit of SFOR.
    - ASRAD – German Rheinmetall Defence Electronics ASRAD-R missile air defense system mounted onto the BRDM-2M-96i. Two Polish BRDM-2M-96i were converted into a fire unit and command vehicle with a radar for demonstration purposes at MSPO 2002.
    - BRDM-2M-96ik "Szakal" – (Szakal – Jackal) Designed in 2003 by WZMech for the Polish troops in Iraq and Afghanistan. It has the Iveco Aifo 8040SRC 6-cylinder diesel engine, an air conditioning unit mounted on the left side of the hull, new accumulators, Fonet internal communication system, RRC-9500 radio, R-3501 portable radio and .50cal WKM-B heavy machine gun instead of the 14.5 mm KPVT heavy machine gun. The gunner has the new CDN-1 day/night sight.
      - BRDM-2M-96ik "Szakal" fitted with improvised armour skirts.
      - BRDM-2M-96ik "Szakal Plus" – (Szakal – Jackal) Because of the high risk of Polish vehicles in Iraq and Afghanistan getting hit and destroyed or damaged by RPG launchers, in 2004 the WZMech design team fitted it with an RPG fence all around vehicle, anti-cumulation screens, additional armour and internal anti-splinter mats. BRDM-2M-96ik "Szakal Plus" can resist hits 7.62 mm armour piercing rounds, anti-infantry mines and old RPG types like the RPG-7. As a result of all that additional protection, however, the weight of the vehicle went up to 8.5 tonnes. Prototype.
    - BRDM-2M-97 "Żbik-B" – BRDM-2M-96i modified to include the Iveco Aifo 8040 SRC-21.11 6-cylinder diesel engine, a 145-litre fuel tank, an upgraded transmission system, Deugra fire and explosion protection, a ZPD 24/2 auxiliary power source, a Thermo 90DW heater, axial compressor, UNZ-50 inertial navigation with GPS, AAS-1 Taifos radiation detection, SSC-1A Obra laser warning, a new NBC and filtration system, and a TNPT-1 sight for the commander. Its manually operated turret is heavily modified with a top hatch and is armed with a 12.7 mm NSVT heavy machine gun (480 rounds) and a 7.62 mm PKT coaxial general-purpose machine gun (2,000 rounds). The gunner has a CDN-1 day/night sight. This new turret allows for a greater elevation range from −4.5 to +32.5 degrees, and it includes a pintle mount for a 9P135M launcher, which can fire four 9M111 "Fagot" (AT-4 Spigot) or 9M113 "Konkurs" (AT-5 Spandrel) ATGMs. Vehicles fitted with the ATGM launcher are designated BRDM-2BF. The turret is also equipped with six 81 mm Cytryn smoke grenade launchers in a row of three on each side of the front, along with a stowage basket at the rear. The vehicle is designed to carry weapons and equipment for a 2–3-man recon squad, including a 60 mm LM-60K mortar (12 rounds), RPG-7 (10 rounds), 7.62 mm PKM general-purpose machine gun (1,400 rounds), a 26 mm wz. 78 flare gun, 18 hand grenades, and an LNS laser range-finder. The modifications increased the vehicle's weight to 8 tonnes, reducing its maximum speed from 100 km/h to 90 km/h on roads and from 10 km/h to 4.2 km/h in water, while its range decreased to 500 km. Its dimensions also increased, with a length of 6.29 m and a height of 2.43 m; however, its width and ground clearance decreased to 2.425 m wide and 285 mm ground clearance. This variant is also known as the BRDM-2B.
      - BRDM-2M-97C "Żbik-P" – BRDM-2M-97 "Żbik-B" with footplate over side episcopes.
      - BRDM-2M-98 "Żbik-A" – Scout company command vehicle version of BRDM-2M-97 "Żbik-B" with more sophisticated reconnaissance equipment, which consists of a BAA electro-optical system made by STN Atlas-Elektronik and an AN/PPS-5C aka SEI MSTAR ground surveillance radar. The vehicle also has additional radio equipment. A prototype underwent trials in 2001. It is also known under designation BRDM-2A.
- BRDM-2 R-5 – Command vehicle equipped with R-130 and R-123M radios, R-323 and R-870M receivers (the R-870M is specifically used to receive transmissions from reconnaissance aircraft). It features two sword antennas, an AZI frame antenna, and additional mounting points for a frame antenna on the right side of the hull's top. The BRDM-2 R-5 serves reconnaissance unit commanders and is designed to operate in coordination with other BRDM-2 armored scout vehicles. It has a four-person crew (driver, commander, radio operator, and gunner). This variant is also known as the BRDM-2D, where "D" stands for "Dowodzenie," meaning "command".

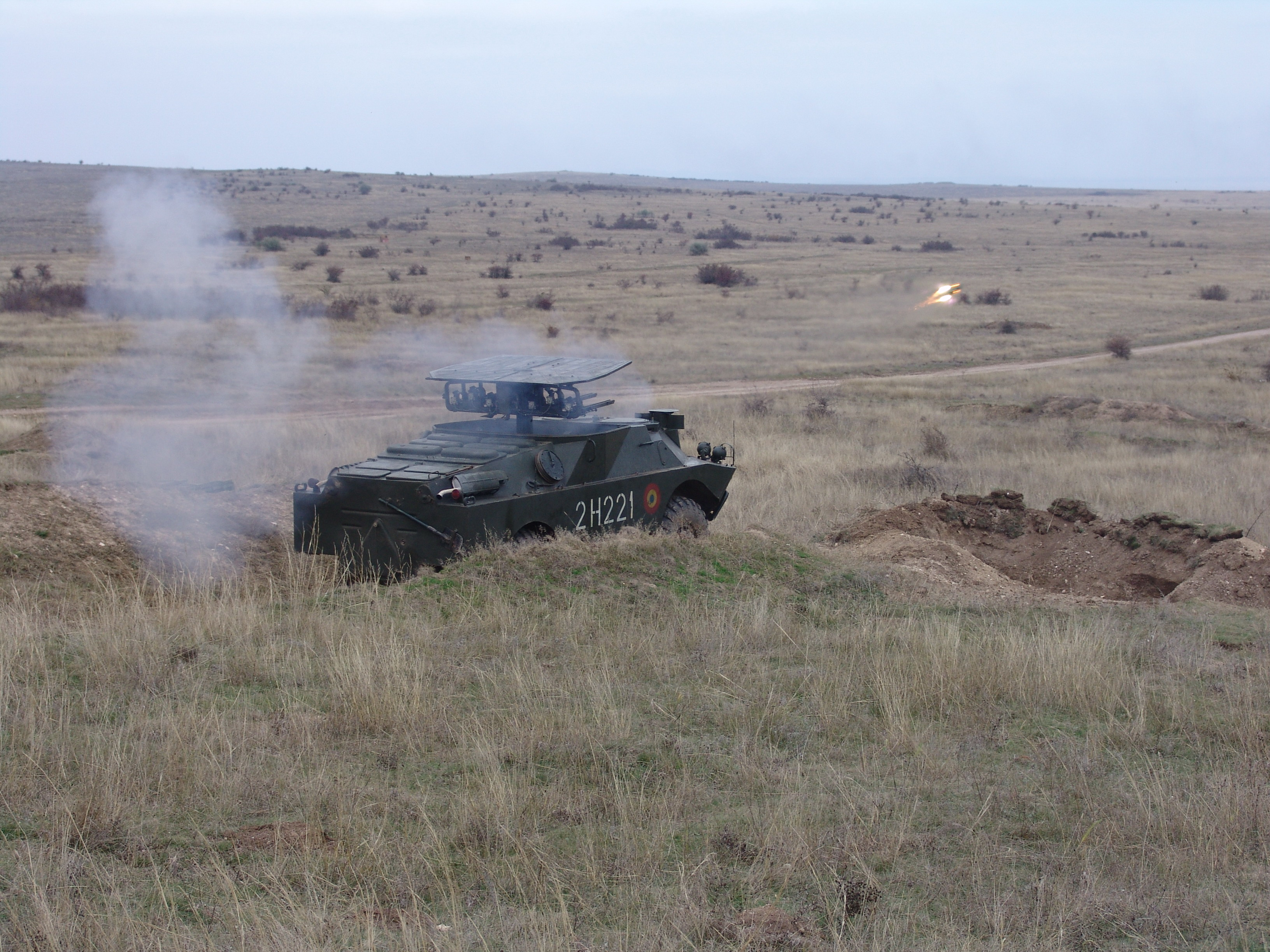
Romanian 9P133 "Malyutka" launching a missile during a military exercise.

=== Russia ===
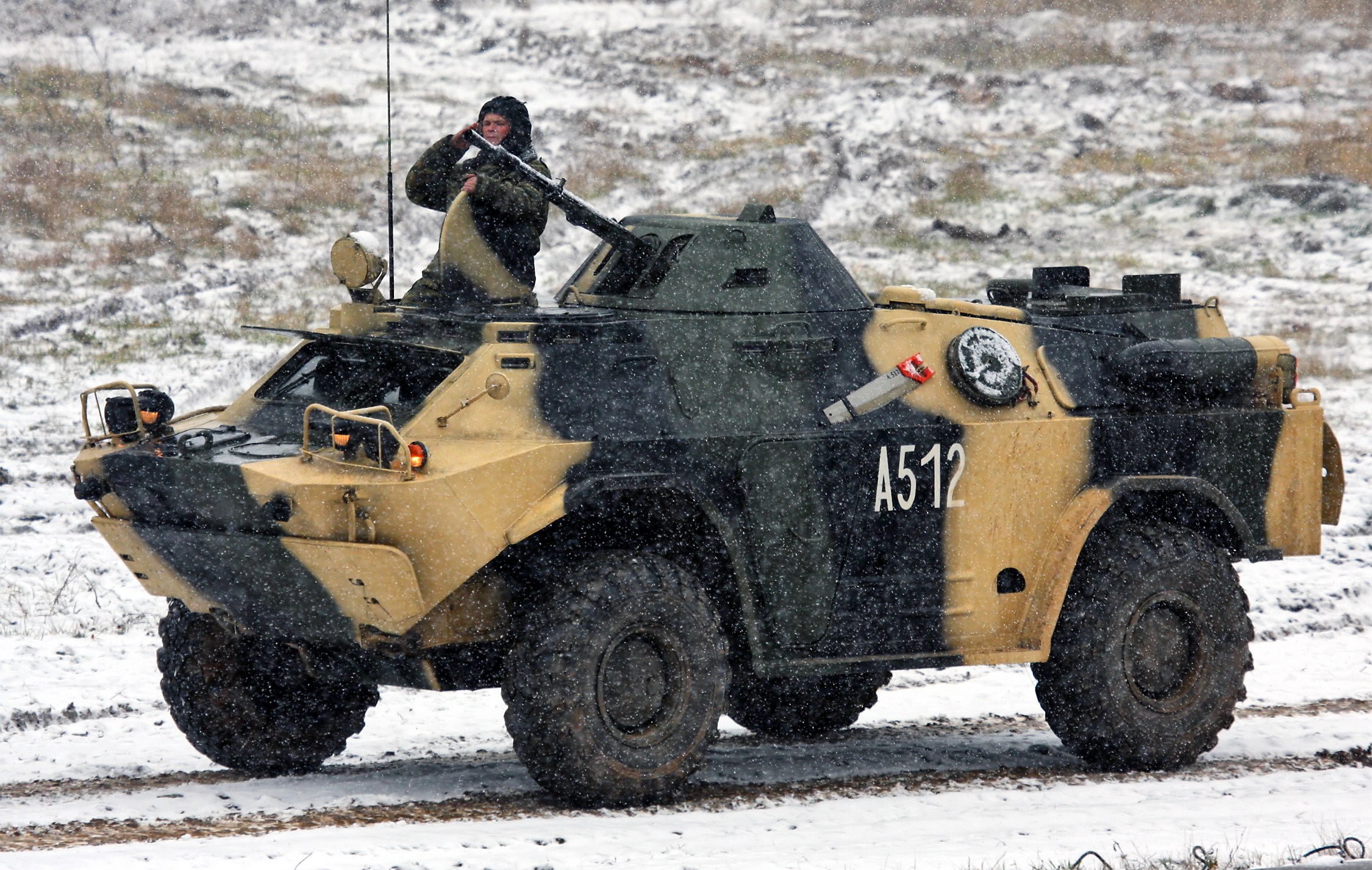
- Russian upgrade BRDM-2M.
  BRDM-2M – Modernised version. There are actually several upgrades with this designation. All of them have the original gasoline engine replaced by a diesel engine (GAZ-562 of 175 hp or Steyr D.245-9 of 136 hp), six MB smoke grenade dischargers on the back of the turret and some are additionally fitted with a BTR-80 style turret, new wheels, GPS etc. The version that was selected by the Russian armed forces is made by Arzamas. Designated BRDM-2A, it is in service with Russian MVD reconnaissance units. Other models have a new turret MA3 or MA4 that is also mounted on the MT-LBM series. All models have the engine exhaust on the right side of the vehicle only. Some have raised horizontal engine decks to fit the new engines.
- BRDM-2PPM – BRDM-2 converted into a fire and rescue vehicle. The armoured shutters on the front windshields and firing ports have been removed. Two windows have been added on the front corners of the hull. Another four windows have been added on each side of the hull (two per each). Two of the driving lights have been removed. The turret has been replaced with some kind of crate. There are two side hatches. There's a small hatch in the rear, most probably used to make repairs easier.
- Umka – BRDM-2 converted for civil use. The front of the hull has been completely rebuilt as it was replaced by a tall superstructure, tall enough to have an adult man standing inside. The superstructure has two windshields in the front and a window on each of the front hull corners. There are two small windows on each side of the side door. The vehicle also has two rear view mirrors and an additional IR spotlight on the top of the superstructure.
- BRDM-2MS – Improved version of BRDM-2M. Modification for the armed forces of Myanmar, Serbia, Laos, Kyrgyzstan, Tajikistan. Additional wheels are dismantled. With the help of new hinged armor, the vehicle can withstand a hit of 14.5 mm KPV machine gun ammunition at distances of 300 meters, side – from 12.7 mm, rear – 7.62, Mine resistance has been strengthened. The total weight is reduced to 6900 kg. New engine with 150 hp. allows to develop maximum speed on the highway up to 100 km/h, on dirt roads – up to 50 km / h. The machine retained the ability to swim across water obstacles. Cruising range of 1,500 kilometers. The new fire control system has a stabilized three-channel panoramic commander sight that can spot the enemy up to 5 km during the day and up to 3.5 km at night. For the all-round view, six cameras are mounted, allowing round-the-clock monitoring of the terrain on four multifunctional panels.
- BRDM-2MB "Bekas" – In June 2020, B-ARMS company presented a new modernization of the BRDM-2 under the name BRDM-2MB Bekas. In fact, "Bekas" has become a modified version of the BRDM-2MS. In the new improvement, the location of additional armored screens has been changed, which have become more compact and fit more closely to the armor. In addition, a new air conditioning system was added to the vehicle, the brake and fuel systems were improved. In the cabin, sprung seats were installed, in the design of which there are shock absorbers adjustable in terms of stiffness. In addition to comfort for the crew, these seats have the ability to damp an impulse when a mine is blown up under an armored car. Changes to the internal layout of the armored car made it possible to make the fighting compartment more spacious. The gearbox has received synchronization. During the past tests of the armored car, its smooth running was noted. The amphibious capabilities of the vehicle were preserved, but significantly decreased. Now the water travel is about 2 kilometers per hour. The bulkhead between the "habitable" compartment and the engine compartment is sealed. This prevents the vehicle from sinking in case of unsuccessful crossing of water obstacles completely and also protects the crew in the event of an engine fire.

=== Serbia ===
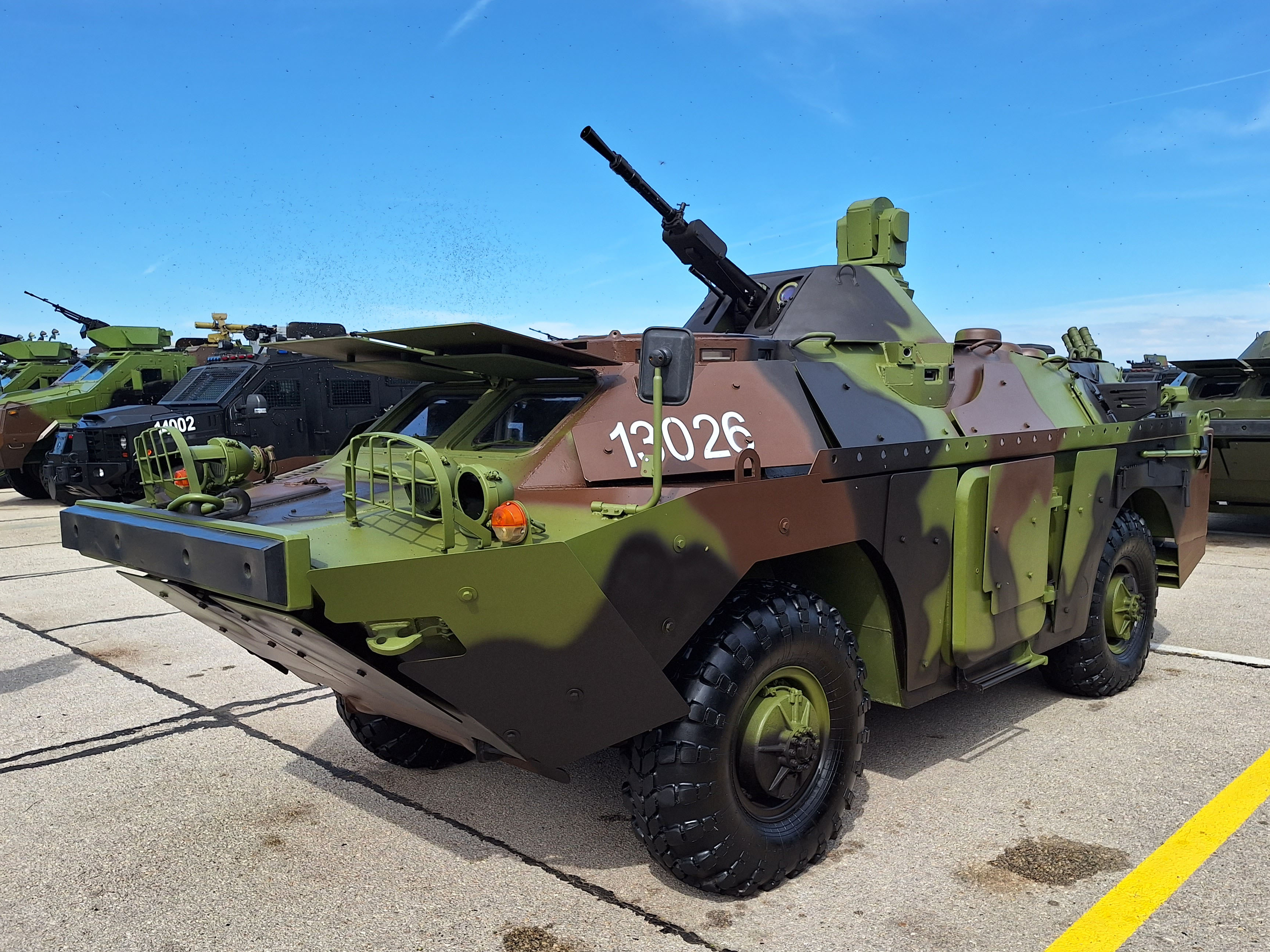
Serbian Army BRDM-2MS

- BRDM-2MS – 30 vehicles delivered to the Serbian Army by Russia in 2020. The Military Technical Institute later improved upon the Russian modernization by adding better-fitting armor plates and Thales TRC-9310AP radio sets.
- Kurjak - Presented at the Partner 2009 military fair, featuring either a Zastava M55 20mm turret or a remotely-controlled 12.7mm NSV machine gun, a panoramic surveillance station, an AMG 6.5 173hp diesel engine and various other improvements. Never left the prototype stage.

=== Slovakia ===
- BRDM-2 fitted with a new engine, new armament and side doors. Belly wheels have been removed.

=== Sudan ===
- Amir build by Military Industry Corporation fitted with a 6 cylinder Diesel engine.

=== Ukraine ===
- BRDM-2D or BRDM-2SMD – by Morozov upgraded version with SMD-21-08 diesel engine with power of 145 hp (108 kW). It also has a new transmission system and new radio equipment. The belly wheels have been removed and side hatches added. In service.
- BRDM-2DI – upgrade from NRMZ with IVECO 138 hp diesel engine and side doors. For the first time presented in 2005. Prototype.

=== United States ===
- BRDM-2 used by the US Army in the OPFOR role. It is fitted with the MILES laser-tag system and a strobe light to indicate if the vehicle is hit.

There are perhaps 20 BRDM-2 vehicles in private hands in the US, maintained and driven by enthusiasts.

== Operators ==
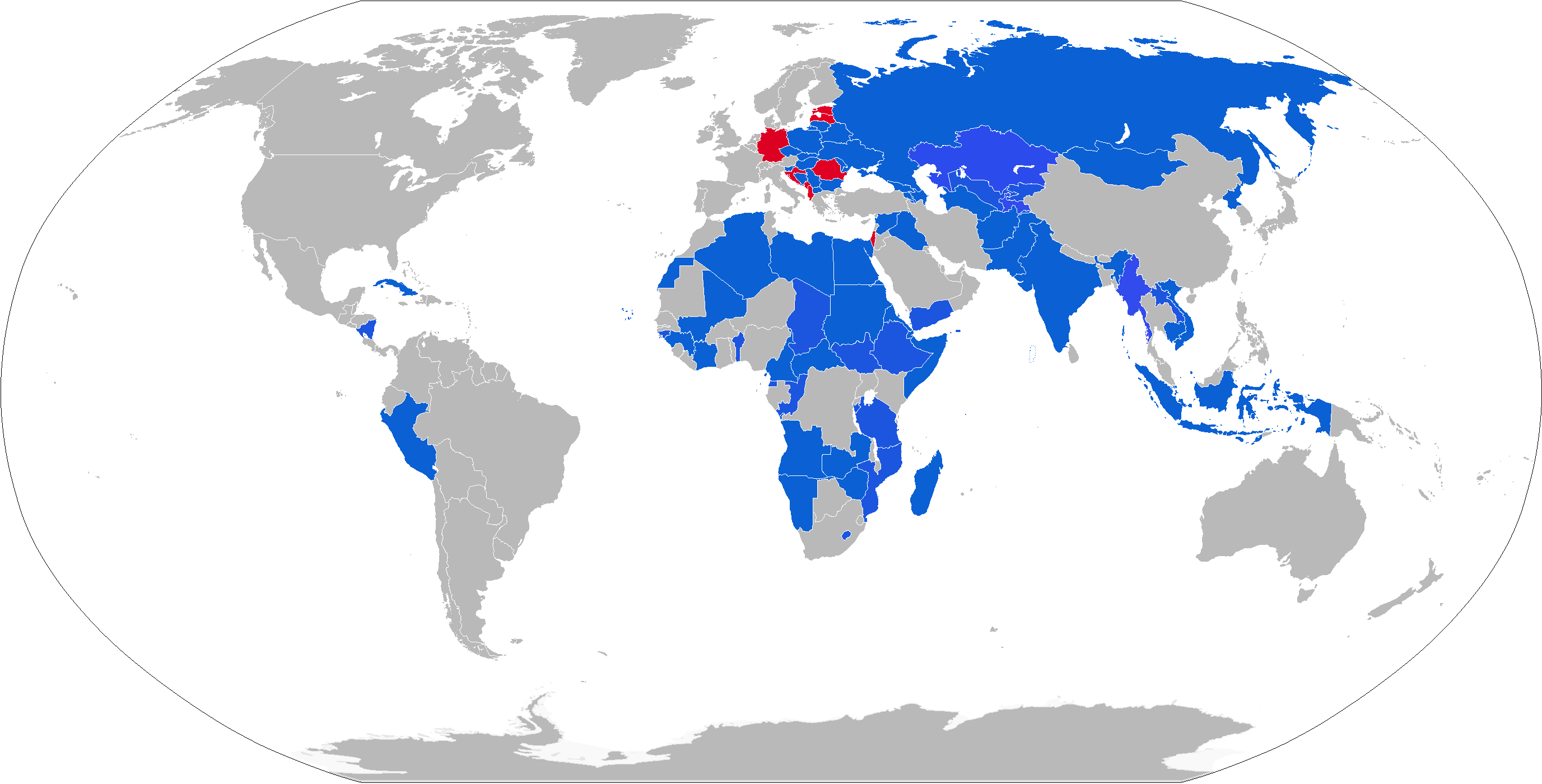
Map of BRDM-2 operators Current Former

=== Current operators ===
- Algeria: 60 BRDM-2 and 64 9P122 "Malyutka".
- Angola: 600
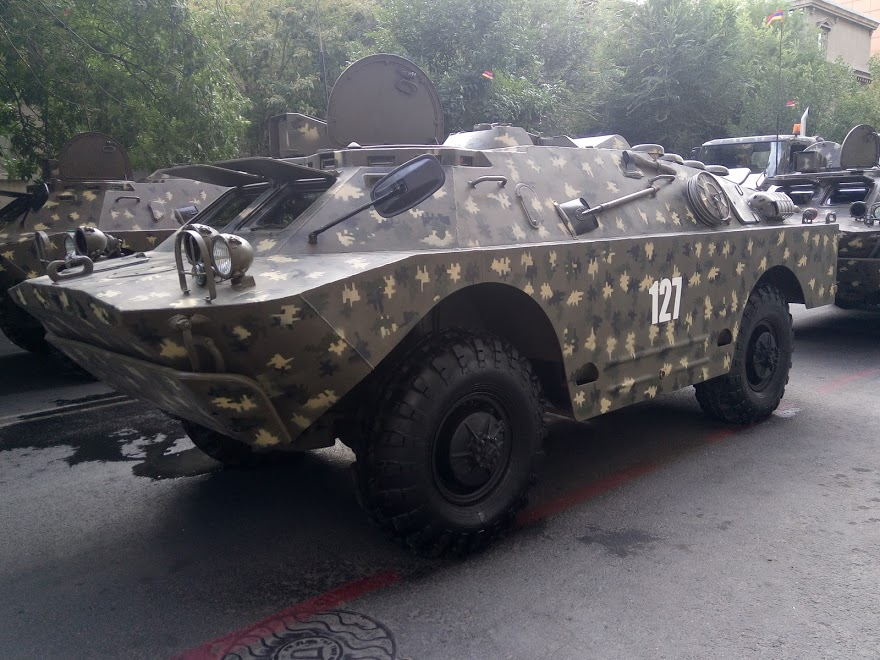
- Armenian BRDM-2 during military parade in Yerevan, 2016.
  Armenia: 120
- Azerbaijan: 29
- Belarus: Caiman variant in service.
- Benin: 14
- Bosnia-Herzegovina: 8 9P122 Malyutka and 9 9P133 Malyutka.
- Burundi: 30
- Cambodia: 200
- Cameroon: 31
- Cape Verde: 10
- Central African Republic: More than 20 delivered by Russia in October–November 2020.
- Chad: ~100
- Republic of Congo
- Cuba: 100 BRDM-2 used for the special forces and 50 modernized with a 120 mm mortar
- Djibouti: 2
- Egypt: 300 BRDM-2, BRDM-2UM + 100 modernized to BRDM-2M96i by Poland.
- Equatorial Guinea: 6
- Eritrea
- Ethiopia
- Georgia: 17
- Guinea: 4 delivered by Ukraine in 1998.
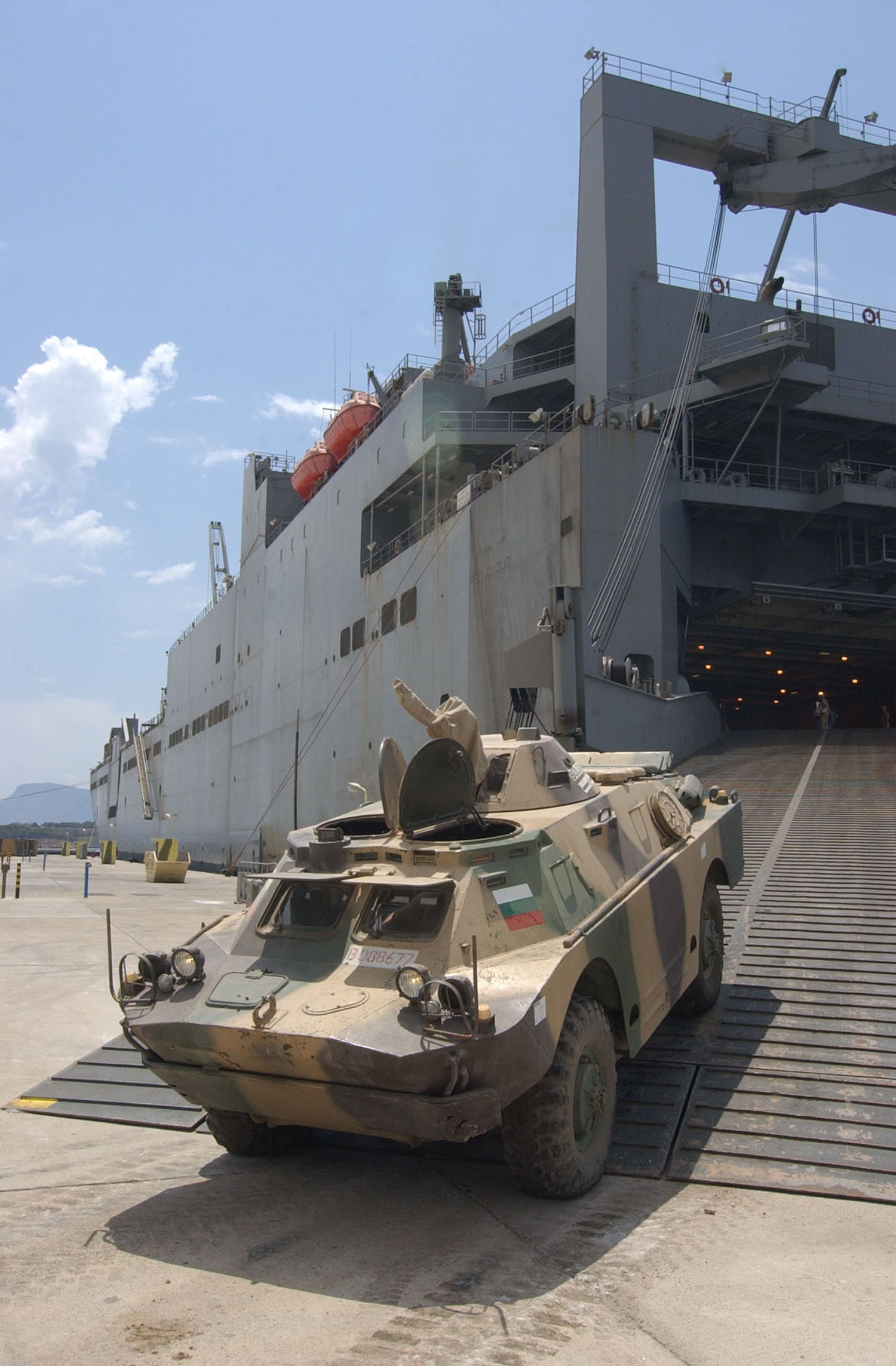
  A Bulgarian BRDM-2 rides off the ramp from USNS Red Cloud (T-AKR 313) at Souda Bay, Greece, en route to Bulgaria, after returning from deployment in Iraq. 26 May 2005.
- Guinea-Bissau: 10
- Iraq: The Iraqi Army uses a number of BRDM-2 armed with ZPU-2 twin 14.5 mm KPV antiaircraft heavy machine guns (See Iraq section for details). Ukraine delivered 13 BRDM-2 armoured scout cars to the Iraqi Army in 2006. The Iraqi Regular Army operated 1,300 BRDM-1 and BRDM-2 armoured scout cars and vehicles based on them.
  - Kurdistan: Peshmerga
- Ivory Coast: 13 delivered by Belarus between 2002 and 2003.
- Kyrgyzstan: 9 upgraded BRDM-2MS vehicles donated by Russia in April 2019.
- Laos: at least 10 upgraded BRDM-2MS supplied by Russia in late 2018 – January 2020.
- Lesotho: 2
- Libya: 350; refurbished by a Czech firm in 2013.
- Madagascar: ~35
- Maldives
- Mali: More than 20 – 64 delivered by USSR and Bulgaria but many of them lost during fights
- Moldova: 27
  - Transnistria
- Mongolia: 120 BRDM-2 and BRDM-2Rkh
- Myanmar: 33 BRDM-2MS received in early 2020. Further examples received in early 2022.
- Namibia: 12 total in use with the Namibian Defence Force, most inherited directly from PLAN or captured models in the custody of the former South West African administration.
- North Korea
- Pakistan: Law enforcement in Pakistan
- Palestine: 45 BRDM-2 delivered by Russia to the Palestinian Authority Police in 1995, later seized by Hamas following the Battle of Gaza in June 2007.
- People's Defense Units (YPG)
- Peru: 20 Late production BDRM-2 model and 12 9P133 ATGM launcher.
- Poland: 265 BRDM-2; 87 BRDM-2 R5 in service as of 2024. 87 BRDM-2 R5115 BRDM-2s, ~110 BRDM-2s modernized to BRDM-2M-96 and BRDM-2M-96i, 37 BRDM-2s modernized to BRDM-2M-97 "Żbik-B" and 1 modernized to BRDM-2M-98 "Żbik-A" level, 54 BRDM-2s modernized to BRDM-2M-96ik "Szakal" level, 27 9P133 "Malyutka" and 18 9P148 "Konkurs" tank destroyers, 98 BRDM-2 R-5 command vehicles, a dozen of BRDM-2RS NBC reconnaissance vehicles, an unknown number of BRDM-2 R-1A command vehicles as of 2011.
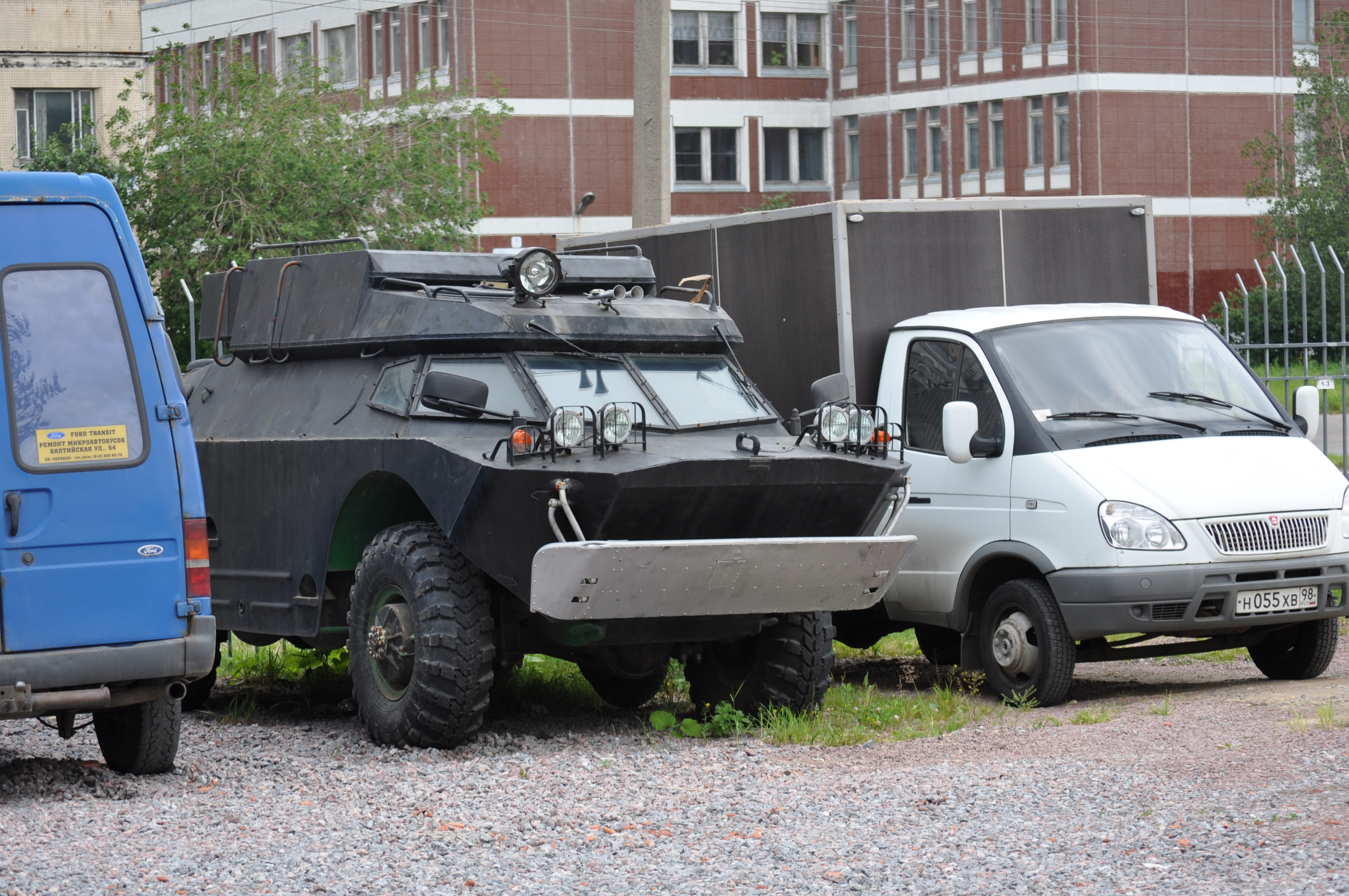
- Russian BRDM-2 converted into a civilian amphibious transport vehicle.
  Russia: 1,000+ (1,000) as of 2011. Around 2,080 as of 2013.
- Serbia: 30 BRDM-2MS, 46 BRDM-2
- Somalia
- Sudan: 60 delivered by Belarus between 2003 and 2004 (39 in 2003 and 21 in 2004).
- Syria: 950
- Tajikistan: About 22 upgraded BRDM-2MS (Donation of Russia in 2019 and 2021)
- Tanzania: 40 delivered in 1978–1979, ~10 available in 2019
- Turkmenistan: 30
- Ukraine
- Vietnam: 200
- Yemen
- Zambia
- Zimbabwe

=== Former operators ===
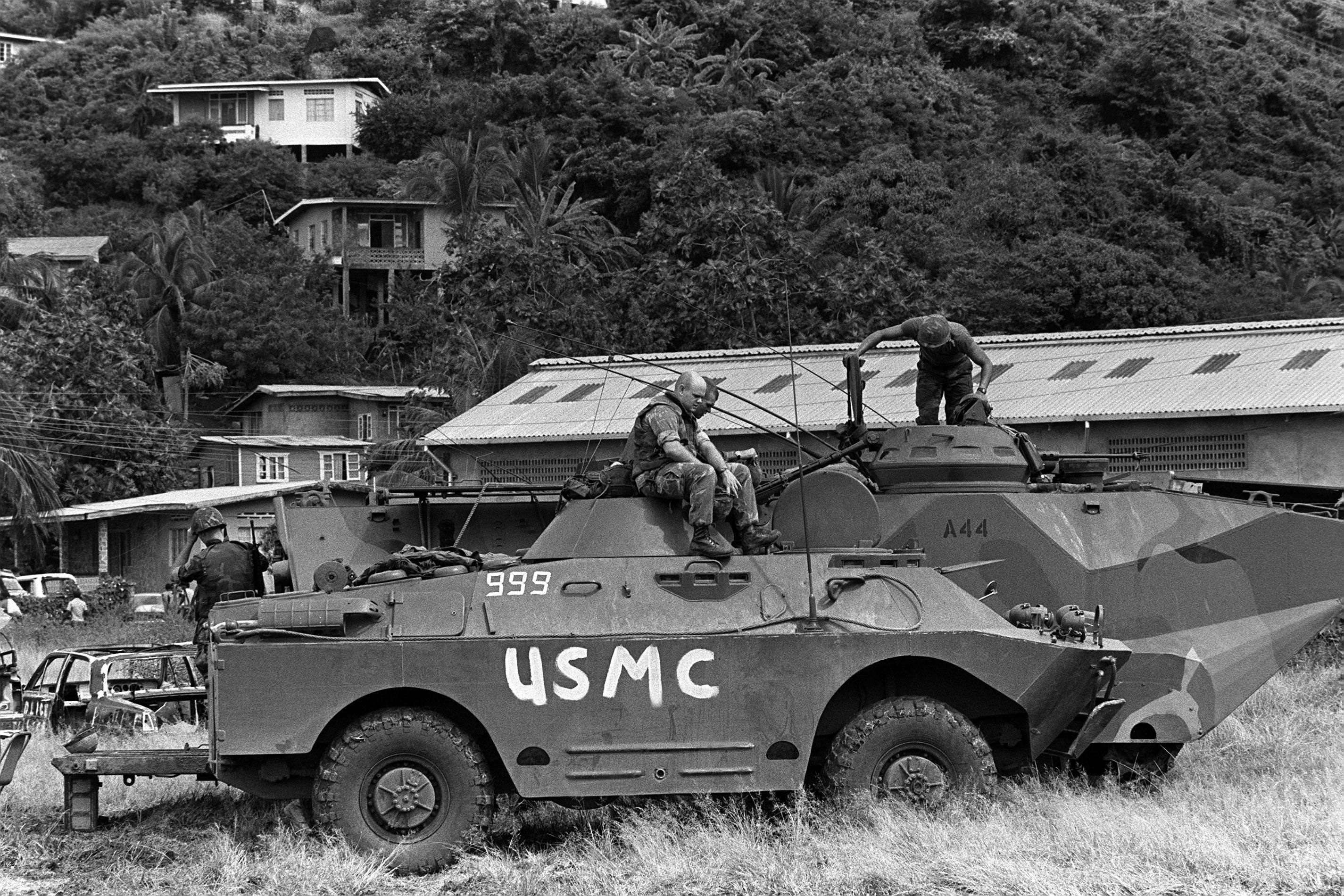
U.S. Marines sit atop a captured Grenadian BRDM-2 during the Invasion of Grenada.

- Afghanistan – Armed Forces of the Democratic Republic of Afghanistan
- Al-Murabitun: operated ex-PLO vehicles in Lebanon (1983–86).
- Albania: 30 BRDM-1 and BRDM-2, all withdrawn.
- Bulgaria: scrapped or sold to other countries
- Croatia: 9
- Estonia: 7, some used by the Estonian Police
- Montenegro: 2
- Czechoslovakia: Passed on to the successor states.
- Czech Republic: BRDM-2RCH scrapped or sold to other countries
- East Germany: 1,579
- Grenada: 2 BRDM-2 were delivered by the Soviet Union to Grenada in 1981 or 1982. Both are no longer in service since the 1983 US invasion – one was destroyed and the other was captured.
- Hungary
- India
- Islamic State
- Latvia: 2 donated by Poland by 1992, mostly used by the Suži Airborne Reconnaissance Battalion of the Latvian Land Forces. Later used as target practice.
- Lithuania: 10
- Macedonia: 10
- Palestine Liberation Organization: Unknown number operated by the PLO in Lebanon and passed on to the Al-Murabitun in 1983.
- South Lebanon Army: Captured vehicles supplied by Israel.
- Slovakia: 6 Retired from service.
- Slovenia: 5 late production BRDM-2s. Command company of 44th Armored-mechanized Battalion "Wolves" operates BRDM-2 vehicles. Retired.
- Soviet Union: Passed on to the successor states.
- Yugoslavia: Passed on to successor states.

== See also ==
- Cadillac Gage Commando – (United States)
- D-442 FÚG – (Hungarian People's Republic)
- ABC-79M – (Romania)
- Textron Tactical Armoured Patrol Vehicle – (Canada)
- RBY MK 1 – (Israel)
- Fennek – (Germany)
