= List of companies of Tunisia =

Location of Tunisia

Tunisia, officially the Tunisian Republic, though often called the Republic of Tunisia in English, is the smallest country in North Africa by land area. Tunisia is in the process of economic reform and liberalization after decades of heavy state direction and participation in the economy. Prudent economic and fiscal planning have resulted in moderate but sustained growth for over a decade. Tunisia's economic growth historically has depended on oil, phosphates, agri-food products, car parts manufacturing, and tourism. In the World Economic Forum 2008/2009 Global Competitiveness Report, the country ranks first in Africa and 36th globally for economic competitiveness, well ahead of Portugal (43), Italy (49) and Greece (67). With a GDP (PPP) per capita of $9795 Tunisia is among the wealthiest countries in Africa. Based on HDI, Tunisia ranks 5th in Africa.

== Notable firms ==
This list includes notable companies with primary headquarters located in the country. The industry and sector follow the Industry Classification Benchmark taxonomy. Organizations which have ceased operations are included and noted as defunct.

Notable companies Status: P=Private, S=State; A=Active, D=Defunct
Name	Industry	Sector	Headquarters	Founded	Notes	Status	
Adwya	Health care	Pharmaceuticals	La Marsa	1983	Pharmaceutical	P	A
Amen Bank	Financials	Banks	Tunis	1966	Private bank	P	A
Arab Tunisian Bank	Financials	Banks	Tunis	1982	Commercial bank	P	A
Banque de l'Habitat	Financials	Banks	Tunis	1973	State bank	S	A
Banque de Tunisie et des Emirats	Financials	Banks	Tunis	1982	Bank	P	A
Banque de Tunisie	Financials	Banks	Tunis	1884	Bank	P	A
Banque Internationale Arabe de Tunisie	Financials	Banks	Tunis	1976	Private bank	P	A
Banque Nationale Agricole	Financials	Banks	Tunis	1959	State bank	S	A
Banque Zitouna	Financials	Banks	Tunis	2009	Islamic bank	P	A
Bourse de Tunis	Financials	Investment services	Tunis	1969	Stock exchange	S	A
Central Bank of Tunisia	Financials	Banks	Tunis	1958	Central bank	S	A
Compagnie Tunisienne de Navigation	Industrials	Delivery services	Tunis	1959	Ferry and freight transport	P	A
Entreprise Tunisienne d'Activités Pétrolières	Oil & gas	Exploration & production	Tunis	1972	State petroleum	S	A
Evertek	Technology	Telecommunications equipment	Tunis	2008	Mobile handsets	P	A
Groupe Mabrouk	Consumer services	Food retailers & wholesalers	Tunis	1948	Supermarkets	P	A
Industries Mécaniques Maghrébines	Consumer goods	Automobiles	Kairouan	1982	Auto manufacturer	P	A
Integration Objects	Technology	Software	Tunis	2002	Software development and consulting	P	A
Karthago Airlines	Consumer services	Airlines	Tunis	2001	Charter airline	P	A
La Poste Tunisienne	Industrials	Delivery services	Tunis	1847	Post	P	A
Monoprix	Consumer services	Food retailers & wholesalers	Mégrine	1999	Supermarkets	P	A
Nouvelair	Consumer services	Airlines	Monastir	1989	Airline	P	A
Princesse El-Materi Holdings	Conglomerates	-	Tunis	2004	Retail, travel, real estate, media, financials	P	A
Société Nationale des Chemins de Fer Tunisiens	Industrials	Railroads	Tunis	1956	National railways	S	A
Société Tunisienne de Banque	Financials	Banks	Tunis	1958	State bank	S	A
Stusid Bank	Financials	Banks	Tunis	1981	Bank	P	A
Syphax Airlines	Consumer services	Airlines	Sfax	2011	Airline, defunct 2015	P	D
Tunisair Express	Consumer services	Airlines	Tunis	1991	Airline, part of Tunisair	S	A
Tunisair	Consumer services	Airlines	Tunis	1948	Flag carrier airline	S	A
Tunisavia	Consumer services	Airlines	Tunis	1974	Charter airline	P	A
Tunisian Company of Electricity and Gas	Utilities	Multiutilities	Tunis	1962	Power and gas	P	A
Tunisie Telecom	Telecommunications	Fixed line telecommunications	Tunis	1995	Telecom, ISP	P	A
Vermeg	Technology	Software	Tunis	1994	Financial software	P	A
Wallyscar	Consumer goods	Automobiles	La Marsa	2007	Auto manufacturer	P	A

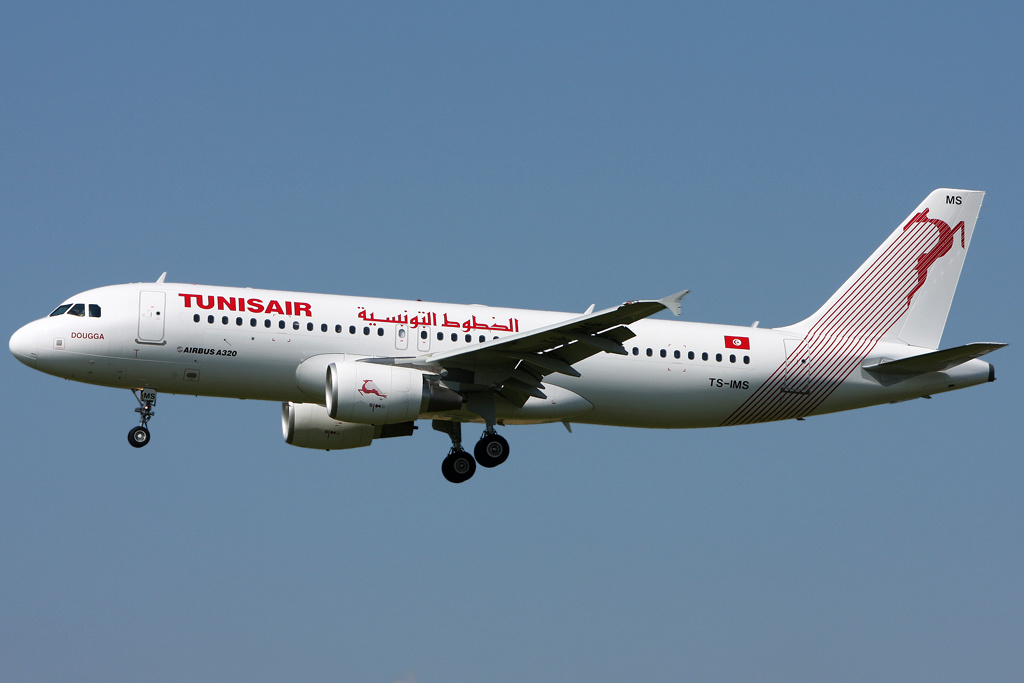
A Tunisair Airbus A320-200 on short final to Zurich Airport in 2011.

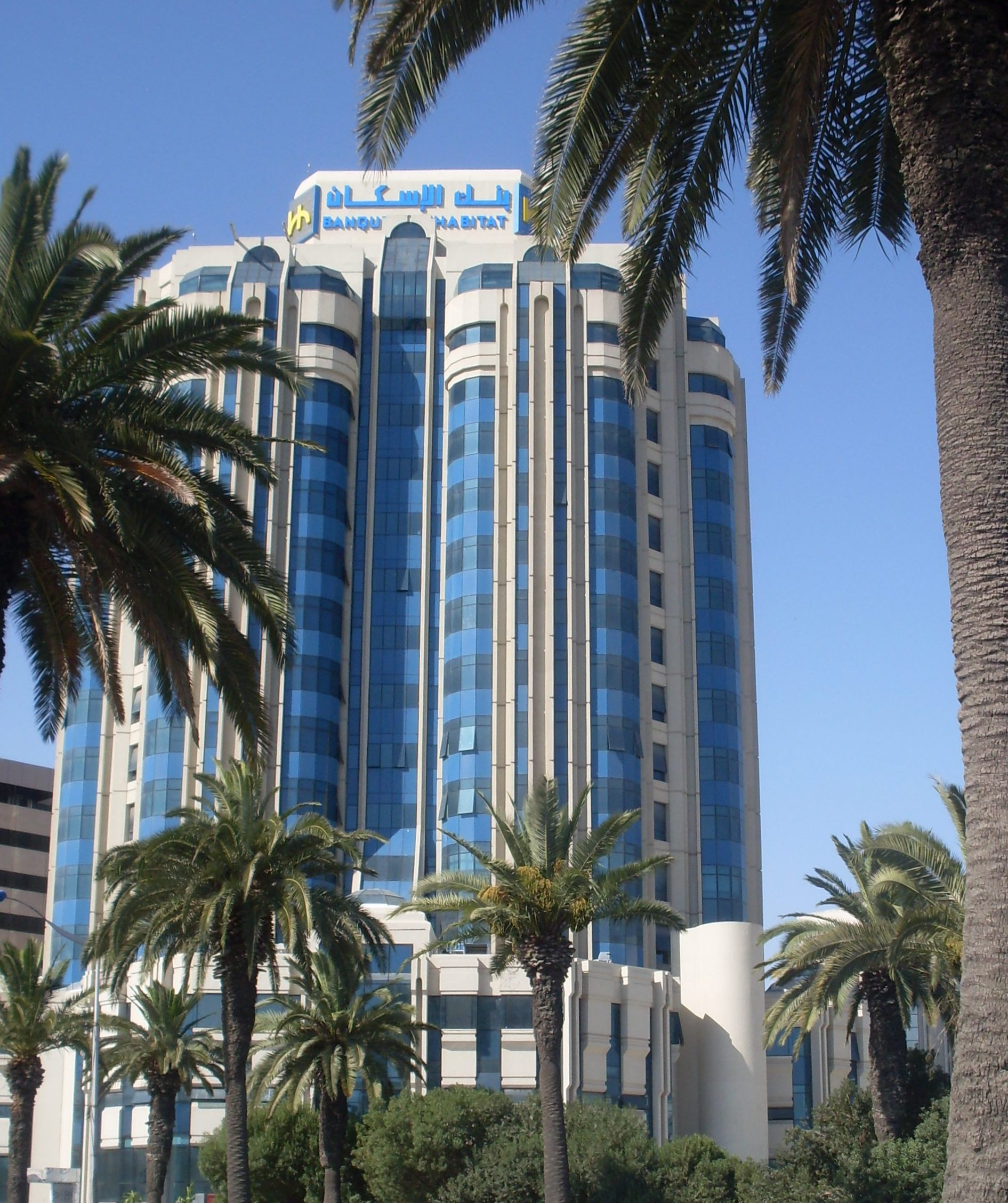
Banque de l'Habitat's headquarters.

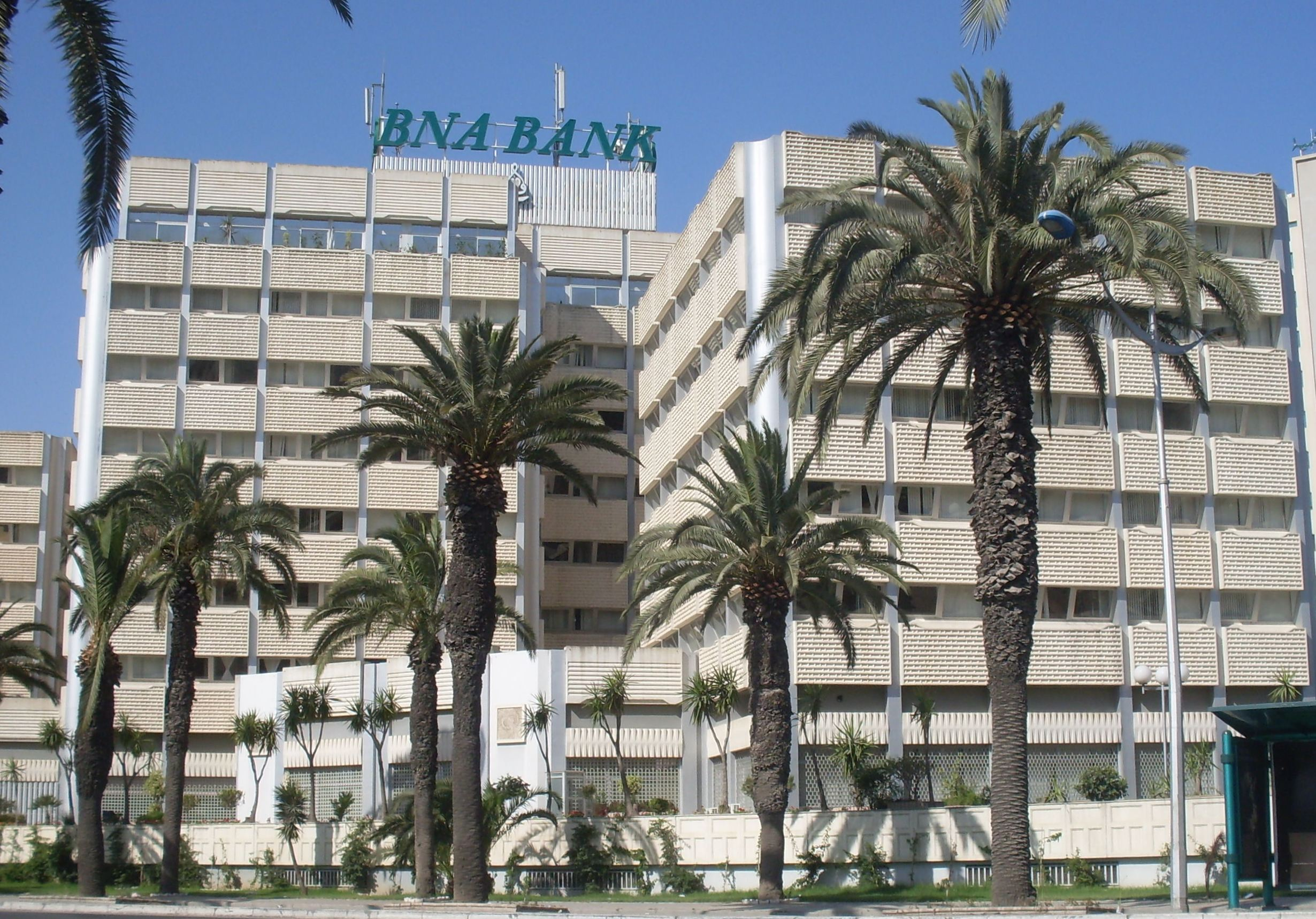
Banque Nationale Agricole's headquarters.

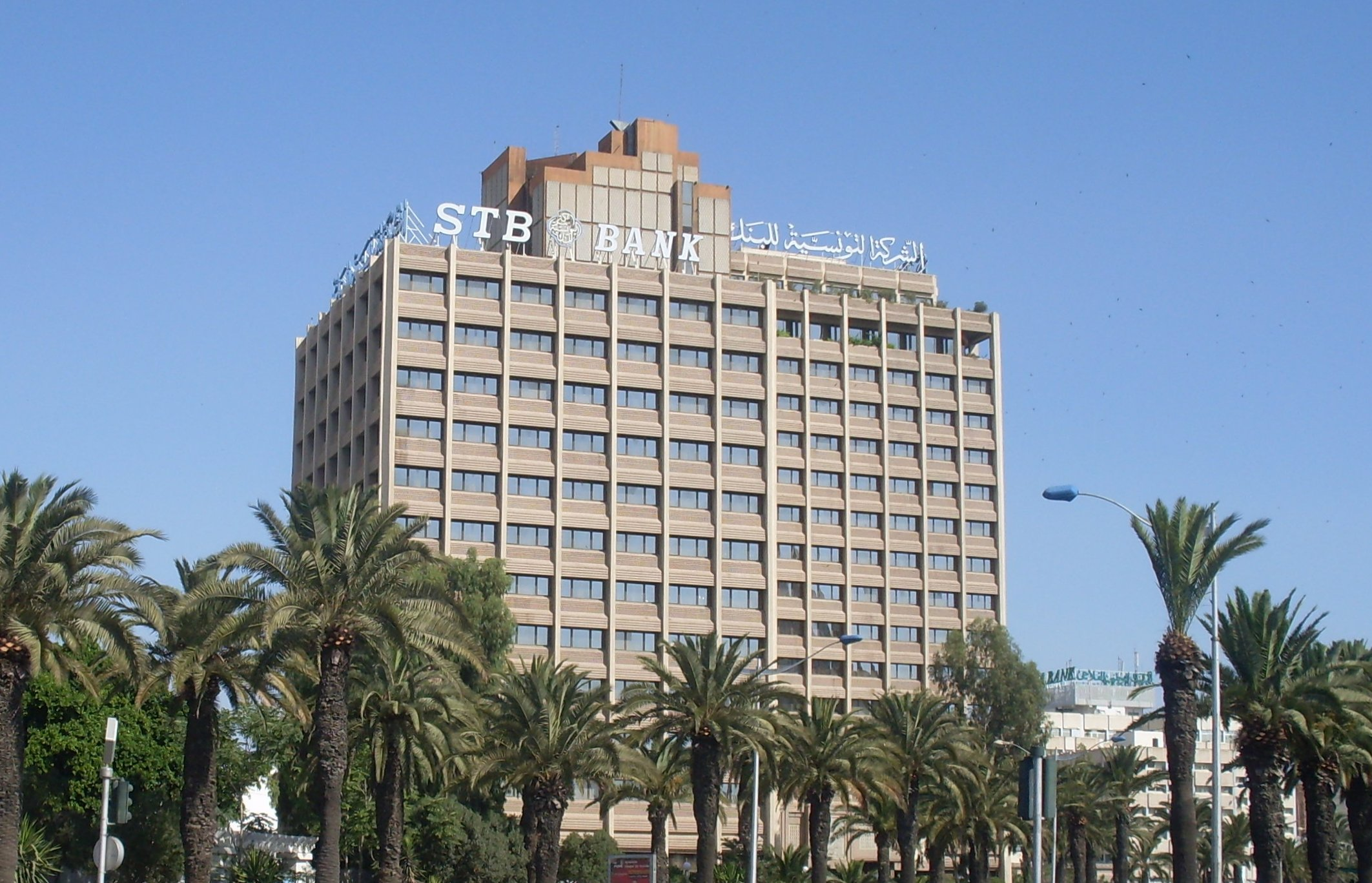
Société Tunisienne de Banque's headquarters.

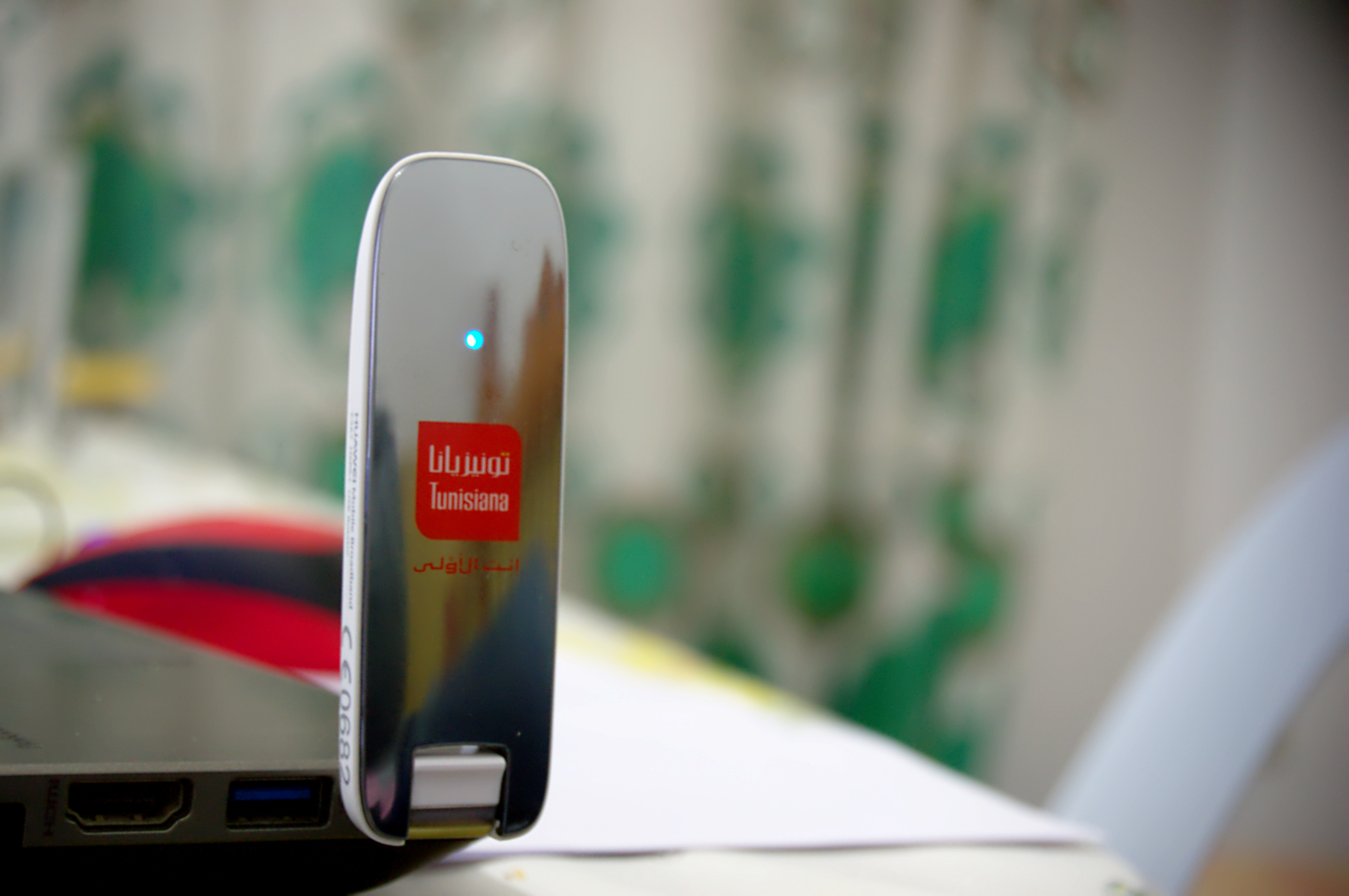
3G of Tunisiana.

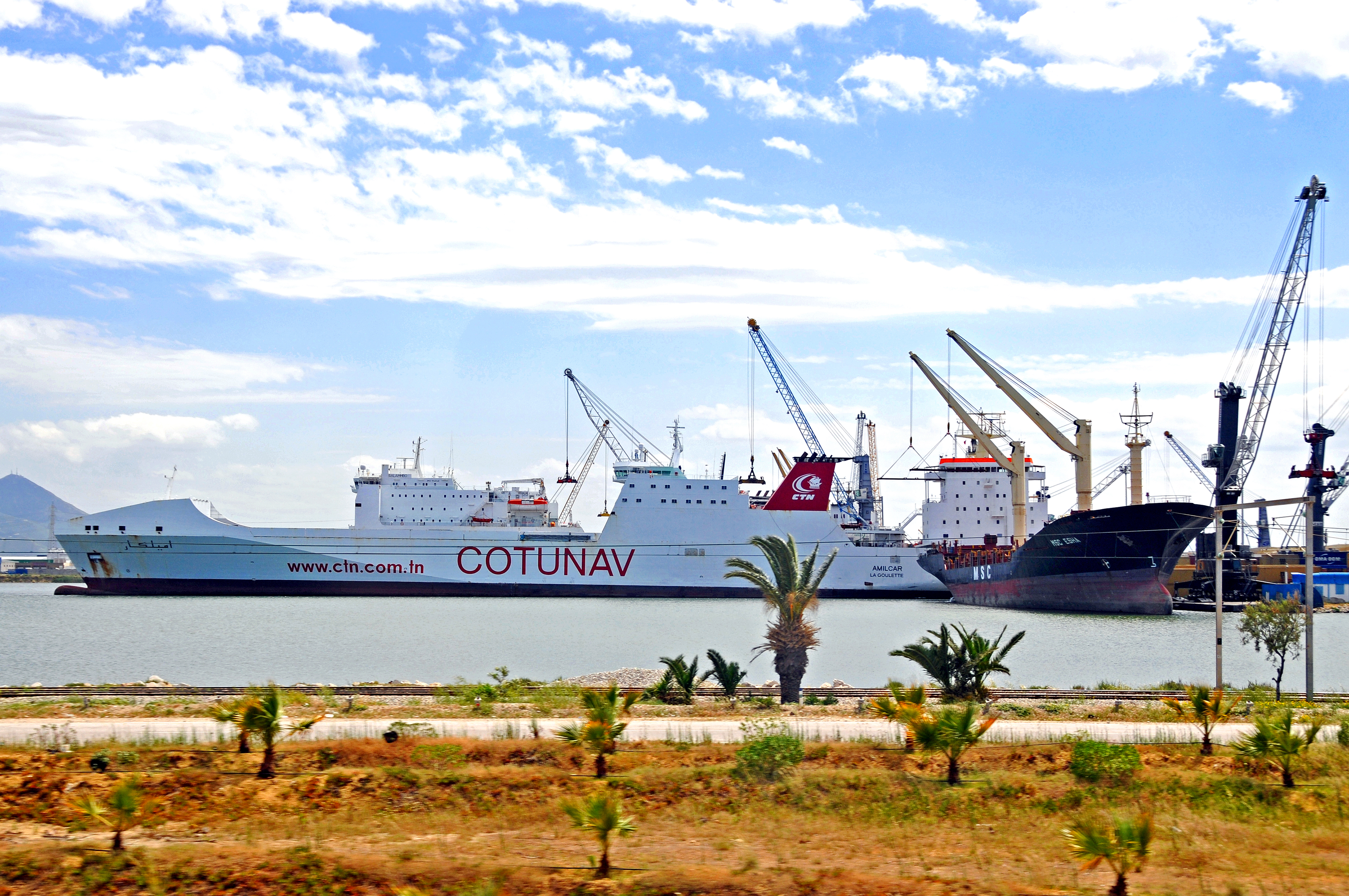
A Compagnie Tunisienne de Navigation cargo ship Amilcar in Tunis harbor, 2012.

== See also ==
- Economy of Tunisia
- List of airlines of Tunisia
- List of banks in Tunisia
