= List of airlines of Tunisia =

This is a list of airlines currently operating in Tunisia.

Airline	Airline (in Arabic)	Image	IATA	ICAO	Callsign	Commenced operations
Express Air Cargo			7A	XRC		2015
Nouvelair	الطيران الجديد تونس		BJ	LBT	NOUVELAIR	1989
TunisAir Express	الخطوط التونسية السريعة		UG	TUX	TUNEXPRESS	1991
Tunisair	الخطوط التونسية		TU	TAR	TUNAIR	1948
Tunisavia	الشركة التونسية للنقل و الخدمات الجوية		-	TAJ	TUNISAVIA	1974

== Defunct airlines ==
This is a list of defunct airlines of Tunisia.

Airline	Image	IATA	ICAO	Callsign	Commenced operations	Ceased operations	Notes
Fly International Airways			NVJ		2002	2002	Rebranded as Nouvelair International
Karthago Airlines		5R	KAJ	KARTHAGO	2001	2010	
Nouvelair International			NVJ		2002	2005	
Sevenair		UG	SEN		2007	2011	Rebranded as Tunisair Express
Syphax Airlines		FS	SYA	SYPHAXAIR	2011	2015	
Tuninter		UG	TUI		1991	2007	Rebranded as Sevenair

== See also ==
- List of airports in Tunisia
- List of companies based in Tunisia
