= List of Fokker F27 operators =

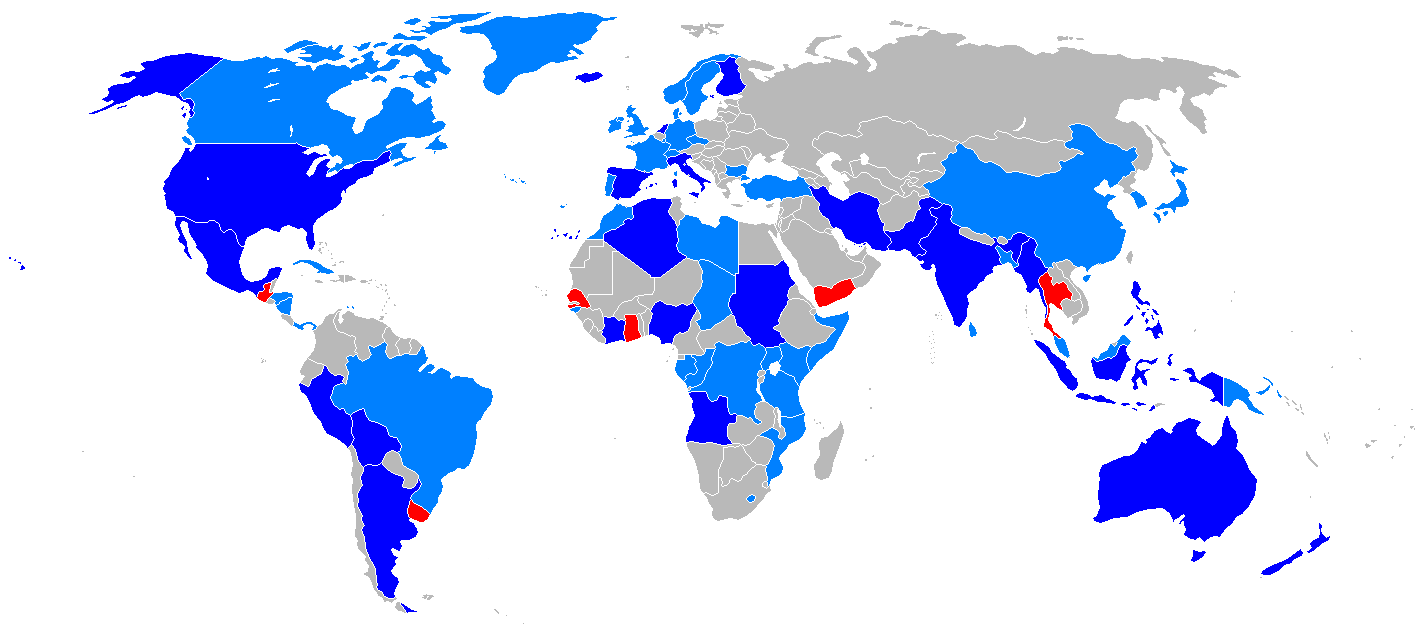
Map of F.27 operators: Light blue = Civil operators Red = Military operators Dark blue = Civil and military operators

The following are current and past operators of the Fokker F27:

== Civil operators ==
As of August 2022, fewer than 20 Fokker F27 aircraft (Cargo and military variants only) remain in airline and military service around the world.

Oman

- Oman Air

Tunisia

- Tunisavia (3 ex Air New Zealand models, and multiple other airframes)

== Military operators ==
=== Current military operators ===
Bolivia

- Bolivian Air Force - 1 in service as of 2025.
- Bolivian Army - 1 in service as of 2025.

Iran

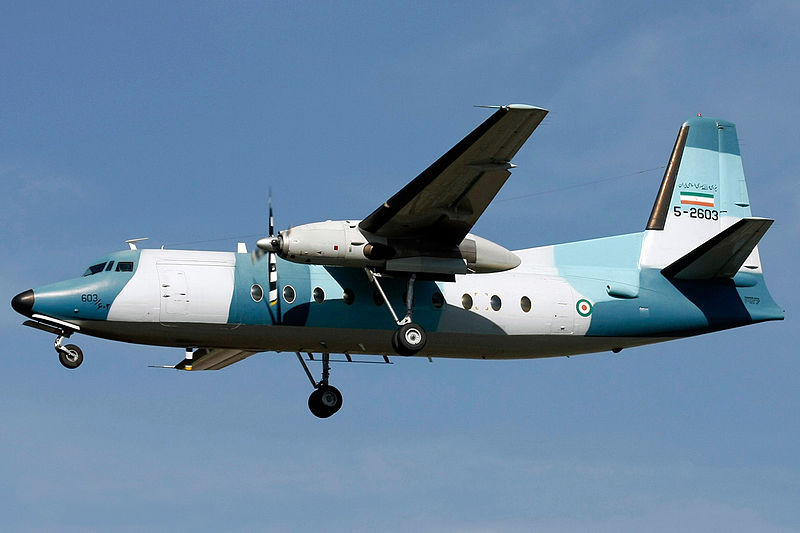
A Fokker F27 of the Islamic Republic of Iran Navy

- Imperial Iranian Air Force, later Islamic Republic of Iran Air Force - 5 in service as of 2025.
- Imperial Iranian Army, later Islamic Republic of Iran Army (Army Aviation) - 1 in service as of 2025.
- Imperial Iranian Navy, later Islamic Republic of Iran Navy (Navy Aviation) - 4 in service (3 transport and 1 maritime patrol aircraft) as of 2025.

Philippines

- Philippine Air Force - 1 in service as of 2025.

Thailand

- Royal Thai Navy - 3 in service (2 transport and 1 maritime patrol aircraft) as of 2025.

=== Former military operators ===
Algeria

- Algerian Air Force - Operated 11 F27-400M Troopship and two F27-600 aircraft.

Angola

- Angolan Air Force - Acquired two F27-200s between 1978-1979, one configured in maritime patrol variant.

Argentina

- Argentine Air Force - Operated at least 11 F27-400M Troopship and 5 F27-600 aircraft.

Australia

- Royal Australian Navy - Operated one F27-500F assigned to the Royal Australian Navy's Laser Airborne Depth Sounder Programme, which was used for airborne bathymetric surveying.

Benin

- Benin People's Air Force - Received two F27-600 aircraft in 1978.

Biafra

- Biafran Air Force - Seized one F27-200 from Nigeria Airways on 23 April 1967. The aircraft was subsequently lost on 10 July 1967 while conducting a bombing mission.

Bolivia

- Bolivian Air Force - Acquired 6 F27-400M Troopships in 1980. The aircraft were operated by Transporte Aéreo Militar (TAM) for military transport and domestic air services.

Chad

- Chad Air Force - Operated one F27-600 Friendship between 1985 and 2004.

Ivory Coast

- Cote d'Ivoire Air Force - Acquired two F27-400M Troopship for tactical transport and one F27-600 for VIP transport.

Finland

- Finnish Air Force - Operated two F27-100 Friendship aircraft and one F27-400M Troopship. One of the F27-100s was modified into electronic reconnaissance variant.

Guatemala

- Guatemalan Air Force - Operated three F27-400M Troopships and three F27-200 Friendship aircraft. Entered service beginning in 1982.

Ghana

- Ghana Air Force - Operated three F27-400M Troopships and two F27-600 variants.

Iceland

- Icelandic Coast Guard - Operated two F27-200 Friendship aircraft. The first was acquired in 1971 and subsequently sold to Icelandair in 1980. A second aircraft, acquired in 1977, was used for fisheries protection and maritime surveillance until its retirement in 2009.

India

- Indian Coast Guard - Initially leased two F27-100 Friendship aircraft from Indian Airlines in 1983. One aircraft was subsequently sold and replaced by another F27-100, bringing the total number operated to three. The aircraft served with No. 700 Squadron until their withdrawal in 1998.

Indonesia

- Indonesian Air Force – Operated 8 F27-400M Troopships beginning in 1976, replacing the ageing C-47 Dakota fleet in military duties. The aircraft were progressively retired between 2012 and 2015.

Mexico

- Mexican Air Force - Operated 5 aircraft, comprising one American-built Fairchild F-27A, one F-27F and three FH-227D aircraft, the latter of which were used for VIP transportation.
- Mexican Navy - Operated two Fairchild F-27 aircraft and one FH-227D transferred from the Air Force.

Myanmar

- Myanmar Air Force (Formerly known as the Burmese Air Force) - Operated both Fokker-built and Fairchild-built aircraft. The Fokker-built fleet included one F27-100 donated by the US government through International Air Inc., one F27-500 delivered by Fokker in 1981, and one F27-600 obtained from Star Air. The Fairchild-built aircraft comprised one F-27J purchased from Singapore in 1982, four FH-227Bs formerly operated by Piedmont Airlines and donated by the United States government in 1978, and one FH-227E acquired from Mobil Producing Services East-Asia, Inc. in 1977.

Italy

- Italian Air Force - Operated three F27-600 aircraft leased from Aero Trasporti Italiani (ATI) for radio and radar calibration duties under the Servizio Radiomisure programme.

New Zealand

- Royal New Zealand Air Force
  - Navigation and Air Electronics Training Squadron RNZAF, based at RNZAF Base Wigram - Operated three F27-120 aircraft for navigation and air electronics training. All three were withdrawn from service following their final RNZAF flights on 17 July 1992.

Netherlands

- Royal Netherlands Air Force - Operated 14 Fokker F27 aircraft, comprising three F27-100 Friendships, nine F27-300M Troopships, and two F27-200MAR maritime patrol aircraft. The initial 12 aircraft were delivered between 1960 and 1961 with the F27-100s used for passenger and VIP transport and the F27-300M for military transport. The two F27-200MARs were delivered in 1981 and 1982 for maritime patrol duties in the Netherlands Antilles and were retired in 2000. The remaining aircraft were withdrawn from service by 1996.

Nigeria

- Nigerian Air Force - Operated 8 Fokker F27 aircraft beginning in 1972, comprising two F27-200MAR maritime patrol aircraft, four F27-400M Troopships, and two F27-600 transport variants.

Pakistan

- Pakistan Air Force - Operated two F27-200 aircraft for VIP transport and utility roles. One aircraft was subsequently transferred to the Pakistan Naval Air Arm.
- Pakistan Navy
  - Pakistan Naval Air Arm - Operated one F27-200, one F27-400M Troopship, and five F27-200MAR maritime patrol aircraft. The fleet comprised former civilian aircraft including some from Pakistan International Airlines, as well as aircraft previously operated by the Pakistan Air Force and Pakistan Maritime Security Agency. The F27 fleet was formally retired in January 2020.
  - Pakistan Maritime Security Agency - Operated two F27-200 aircraft for maritime surveillance. One aircraft, AP-BDG (construction number 10252), was transferred to the Pakistan Naval Air Arm in 1990, while the other, AP-BDF (construction number 10254), was transferred to the Pakistan Army in 1992 and subsequently to the Pakistan Air Force in 1994.

Peru

- Peruvian Air Force - Operated one Fairchild FH-227, initially acquired by the Peruvian Ministry of Fisheries in 1981 and transferred to the Air Force in 1982.
- Peruvian Navy - Operated two F27-400M Troopship delivered in 1977 and were configured for maritime patrol duties. A third F27, an F27-500F, was later acquired in 1995.
- Peruvian Coast Guard - Operated two Fokker F27 aircraft, an F27-200 acquired in May 1994 and an F27-600 acquired in October 1995. They were used for coastal surveillance and other maritime support duties

Spain

- Spanish Air Force - Operated three F27-200MAR maritime patrol aircraft, designated as D.2 with No. 802 Maritime Surveillance and Search and Rescue Squadron based at Gando Air Base in the Canary Islands. The aircraft entered service in 1979 with all three retired in December 2013.

Senegal

- Senegalese Air Force - Received six Fokker F27-400M Troopship transport aircraft between 1977 and 1979.

Sudan

- Sudanese Air Force - Four F27-400M Troopship were acquired in 1964, followed by two F27-100 Friendship aircraft in 1986.

Uruguay

- Uruguayan Air Force - Acquired two F27-100 Friendship aircraft in 1970 which served with Escuadrón Aéreo No. 3 until their retirement in 2000. Three Fairchild FH-227D aircraft were also delivered in 1971 with one was lost in an accident in the Andes on 13 October 1972. The remaining aircraft were subsequently withdrawn from operational service in 1994.

United States

- United States Army
  - United States Army Parachute Team - Operated two F27-400M Troopships, designated as C-31A. Acquired on lease in November 1985 and purchased outright in 1988 for transport duties and as parachute jump platforms for the Golden Knights. The aircraft, named Ambassador and Excalibur remained in service until it was replaced by the C-147A in 2019.
- United States Navy - Operated a single Fairchild-built F-27A, unofficially designated as UC-27A. It was used in support for the Atlantic Undersea Test and Evaluation Center (AUTEC) and later served with the Naval Air Warfare Center – Aircraft Division.

Yemen

- Yemeni Air Force - Operated F27 aircraft inherited from the former Yemen Arab Republic Air Force following the unification of North and South Yemen in 1990. The former North Yemeni fleet included three F27-100 Friendship aircraft and one F27-400M Troopship.

== See also ==
- Fokker F27
