= LH Aviation LH-10 Ellipse =

LH-10 Ellipse
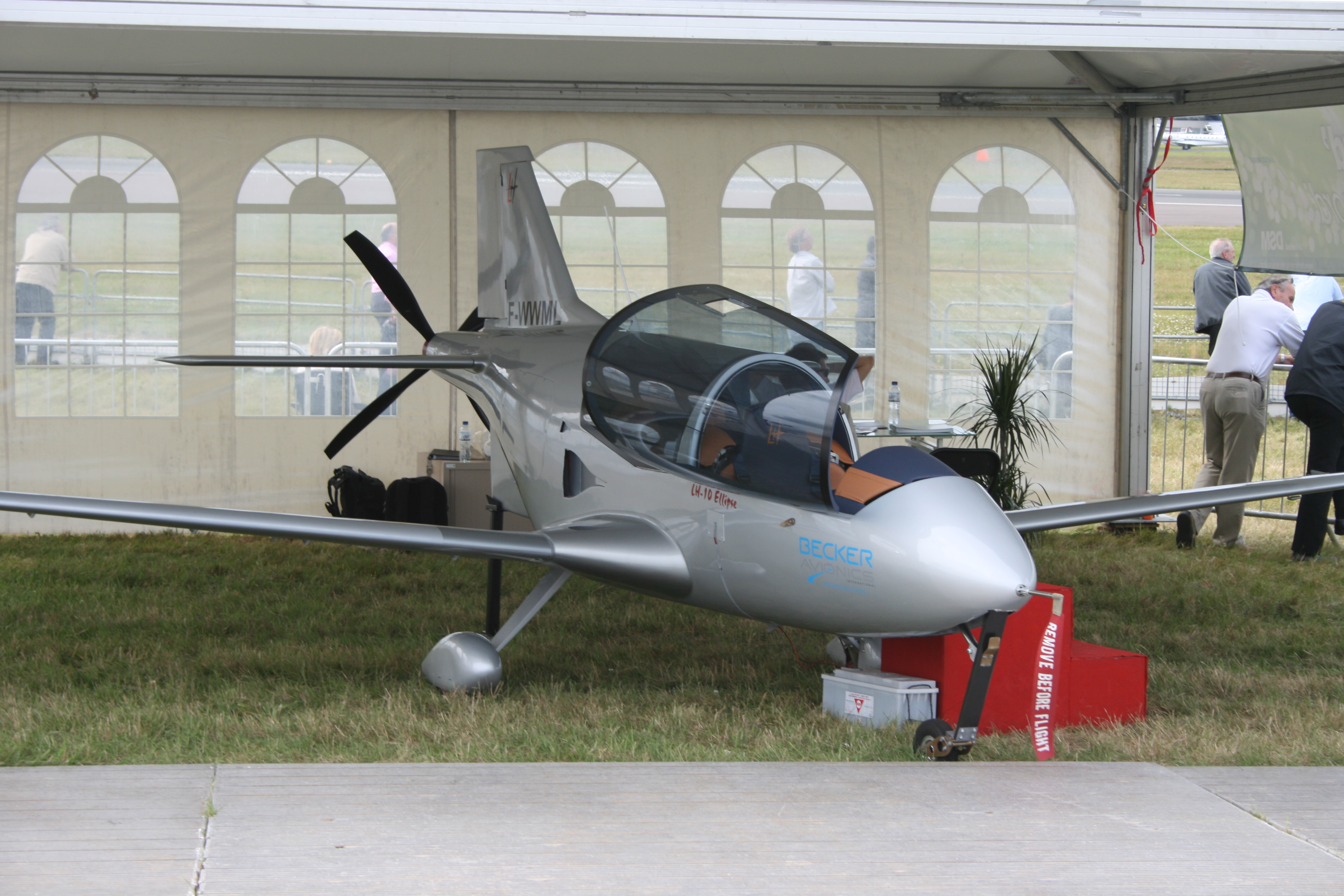
- LH-10 Ellipse F-WWML at the 2008 Farnborough Airshow

General information
- Type: Light aircraft
- Manufacturer: LH Aviation
- Status: In production
- Primary user: Benin Air Force
- Number built: 3

History
- Manufactured: 2007-present
- First flight: 2007

The LH Aviation LH-10 Ellipse is a two-seat light aircraft kitplane designed by LH Aviation of France and manufactured in Morocco . It is a low-wing single-engine pusher configuration with a tandem seating arrangement, and is constructed of composite materials. The plane is marketed in a surveillance configuration as the Grand Duc (Eurasian eagle-owl).

== Design and development ==
The LH-10 Ellipse was conceived by Frenchman Sébastien Lefebvre, starting as an engineering grande école (university) project to conceive "a small plane with different design and performance than available for private pilots". This led to the company's founding, LH Aviation, in May 2004.

As a surveillance plane, Sébastien Lefebvre conceives of the plane as an alternative to drone UAVs, the latter being costly to operate, especially near airports. The Ellipse aims to "deliver 80% of the range of drone missions for 20% of the cost". The plane's potential for surveillance and military missions led the investment fund Magellan Industries to become a shareholder in LH Aviation. The Ellipse was thus further developed in collaboration with Thales as a modular platform for civilian and military missions with different equipment systems, including day and night vision, rocket launching, and on-board communication systems.

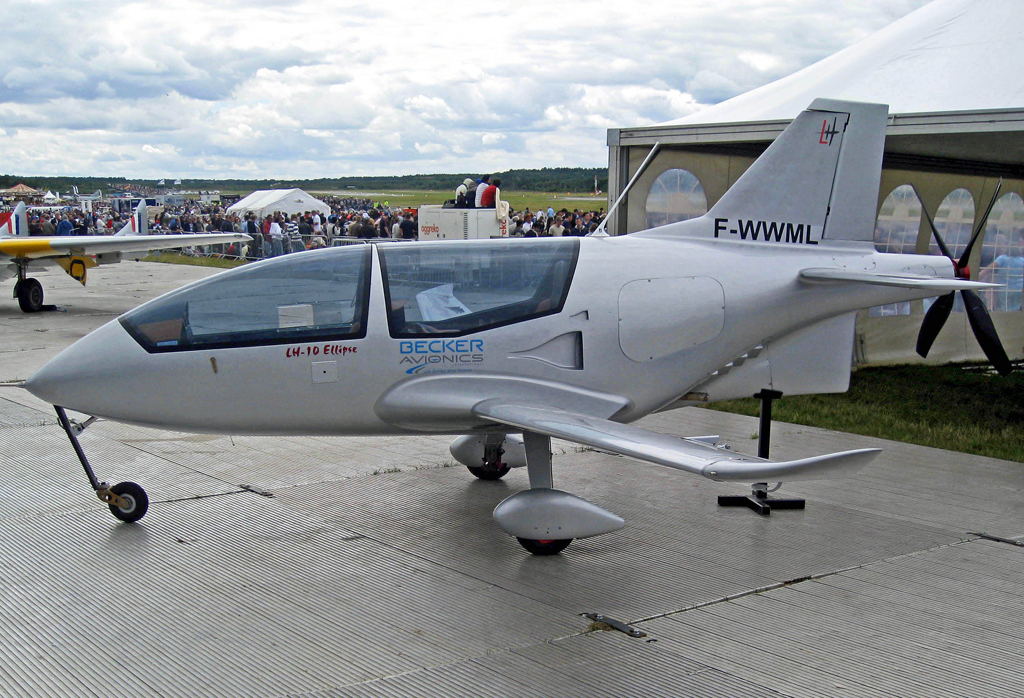
Side view of the LH-10 Ellipse exhibited at the 2008 Farnborough Air Show

The LH-10 Ellipse is a low-wing, tandem two-seat light kit aircraft, powered by a 100 hp Rotax petrol engine in a pusher-propeller configuration. Its low weight and unusual configuration is designed to deliver a very high cruising speed with exceptional fuel economy. This high speed and a relatively high 50-knot stall speed will exclude it from the UK Microlight or United States LSA categories, so a full single-engine private pilot certificate will be the minimum certification requirement to fly it in these countries, which are not the immediate target of the manufacturer, anyway. At the 2008 Farnborough Airshow LH-Aviation said that for the future they would be looking into LSA/ELA compliant production, possibly for the United States.

The airframe is constructed of composite material based on ingredients produced by DSM. The production model is powered by a Rotax 912 four-cylinder reciprocating engine. (It has been tested using the 100 hp ULS variant, other options having been tested and discarded.) The undercarriage is a tricycle design, and will be available in fixed or electrically retractable front wheel configuration. The plane's design, with propeller in the tail and a short-nosed fuselage with a forward pilot seat in glider configuration, offers a field of view of 300 degrees.

The design follows the Bede BD-5 configuration, but is longer, more streamlined and of lighter composite material.

In February 2010, the aircraft began a series of tests required to achieve the French CNSK standard (an acronym for Certificat de Navigabilité Spécial Kit, the French kitplane certification). The company reported that "all construction documents have been validated in December 2009 by the French and English authorities."

== Operational history ==
The Benin Armed Forces ordered two Grand Ducs to monitor their coastlines around the capital Porto-Novo. The Grand Duc is a so-called "aerial territory surveillance system" and differs from the original version only in its more extensive on-board instrumentation, including an autopilot, equipment for night flying, GPS, Iridium satellite communications, transponder, digital camera and a Geobox system for tracking the aircraft from the ground.

The first production Grand Duc appeared at the June 2011 Paris Air Show, painted in the colours of the Benin Air Force. The first unit was delivered to Benin in late 2012 and the second unit was scheduled to be delivered in September 2013. By 2018, no aircraft were operational.

At the 2013 Paris Air Show, the company announced that it had received an order for 10 planes from Dubai-based Jet Energy. The planes are to be used in monitoring pipelines, oil rigs, and in tracking the dhows that conduct contraband trade between Iran and the United Arab Emirates.

== Specifications ==
Data from Jane's All the World's Aircraft 2011/12

General characteristics

- Crew: Two
- Length: 5.11 m (16 ft 9 in) excluding nose probe
- Wingspan: 8.00 m (26 ft 3 in)
- Height: 2.40 m (7 ft 10 in)
- Wing area: 4.50 m^{2} (48.4 sq ft)
- Aspect ratio: 14.2
- Empty weight: 300 kg (661 lb)
- Max takeoff weight: 540 kg (1,190 lb)
- Fuel capacity: 70 L (15.4 Imp gal, 18.5 US gal)
- Powerplant: 1 × Rotax 912 ULS flat 4-cylinder piston, air- and water-cooled, 73.5 kW (98.6 hp)
- Propellers: 4-bladed ground adjustable pusher

Performance

- Maximum speed: 370 km/h (230 mph, 200 kn)
- Cruise speed: 269 km/h (167 mph, 145 kn)
- Stall speed: 106 km/h (66 mph, 57 kn)
- Never exceed speed: 450 km/h (280 mph, 240 kn)
- Range: 1,408 km (875 mi, 760 nmi)
- Endurance: 10 hr
- g limits: +4.4/-2.2

== See also ==
Aircraft of comparable role, configuration, and era

- Bede BD-5
