= Chief of the Defence Staff (Benin) =

- Chef d'etat major général des armées (French)
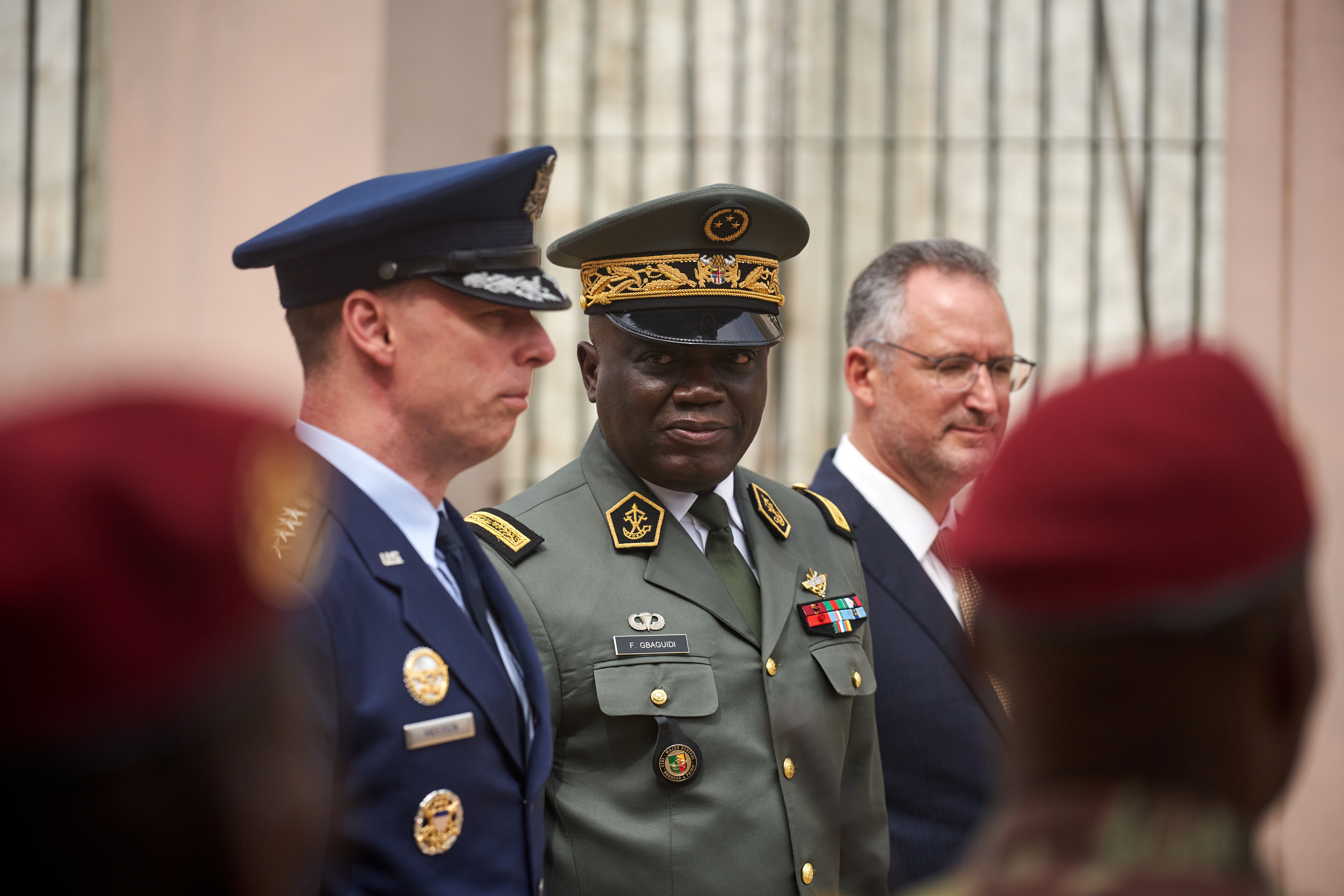
- Incumbent; Brigadier general Fructueux Gbaguidi since 12 April 2022
- Benin Armed Forces
- Reports to: Minister of National Defence
- Appointer: The president
- Formation: 1960
- First holder: Christophe Soglo
- Deputy: Deputy Chief of the Defence Staff

The chief of the defence staff (French: Chef d'etat major général des armées) is the highest-ranking military officer in the Benin Armed Forces and is responsible for maintaining control over the service branches.

== List of officeholders ==
=== Republic of Dahomey (1960–1975) ===
No.	Portrait	Name (born–died)	Term of office			Ref.
No.	Portrait	Name (born–died)	Took office	Left office	Time in office	Ref.
		Alphonse Alley (1930–1987)	1965	September 1967	1–2 years	
		Maurice Kouandété (1932–2003)	September 1967	1969	1–2 years	

=== People's Republic of Benin (1975–1990) ===
No.	Portrait	Name (born–died)	Term of office			Ref.
No.	Portrait	Name (born–died)	Took office	Left office	Time in office	Ref.
		Mathieu Kérékou (1933–2015)	4 May 1977	September 1981	4 years, 4 months	
		Barthélémy Ohouens	September 1981	February 1985	3 years, 5 months	
		Charles Bebada	February 1985			

=== Republic of Benin (1990–present) ===
No.	Portrait	Name (Birth–Death)	Term of office			Defence branch	Ref.
No.	Portrait	Name (Birth–Death)	Took office	Left office	Time in office	Defence branch	Ref.
		Major general Fernand Amoussou (born 1955)	2000	17 August 2005	4–5 years	Army	
		Major general Mathieu Amoussa Chabi Boni (born 1956)	17 August 2005	28 March 2012	6 years, 224 days	Army	
		Major general Soumanou Oke (born 1955)	28 March 2012	30 June 2012	94 days	Army	
		Brigadier general Emmanuel Joseph Akpona (born 1957)	30 June 2012	28 January 2013	212 days	Army	
		Counter admiral Denis Hounsou Gbèssèmèhlan	28 January 2013	30 December 2015	2 years, 336 days	Navy	
		Brigadier general Awal Djibril Bouko Nagnimi	30 December 2015	16 September 2016	261 days	Army	
		Brigadier general Laurent Amoussou	16 September 2016	14 November 2018	2 years, 59 days	Army	
		Counter admiral Patrick Jean Baptiste Aho (born 1960)	14 November 2018	12 April 2022	3 years, 149 days	Navy	
		Brigadier general Fructueux Candide Ahodegnon Gbaguidi	12 April 2022	Incumbent	4 years, 148 days	Army	
