= Soumanou Oke =

Beninese military officer and statesman (1955–2022)

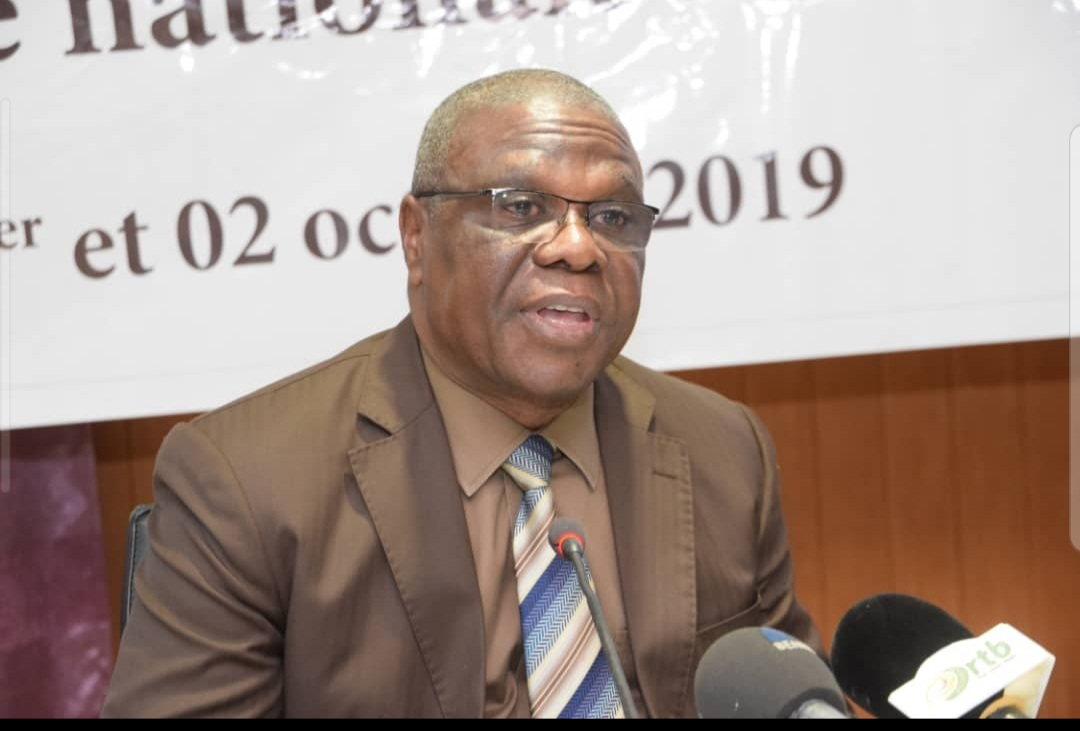
- Oke in 2019
- Born: 21 May 1955; Bantè, French Dahomey, French West Africa
- Died: 17 December 2022 (aged 67); Paris, France
- Education: National University of Benin
- Occupation: Military officer

Soumanou Oke (21 May 1955 – 17 December 2022) was a Beninese military officer and statesman.

== Biography ==
Oke was born in Bantè on 21 May 1955. He attended a Catholic primary school and a Protestant secondary school before entering the National University of Benin. He joined the Benin Armed Forces on 1 July 1977. He continued his military training in Ouidah and Tripoli from 1977 to 1978.

On 1 October 1981, Oke obtained the rank of lieutenant. From 2006 to 2012, he was Deputy Chief of General Staff of the Benin Armed Forces as a brigadier general. During this time, he commanded the logistics maneuvers of the Economic Community of West African States. From 13 to 29 October 2010, he led the African Union's "AMANI AFRICA" military exercise in Addis Ababa. He was then appointed Chief of General Staff of the Benin Armed Forces, succeeding General Mathieu Boni. He retired from the military on 1 July 2012 as a major general.

Soumanou Oke died in Paris on 17 December 2022, at the age of 67.

== Awards ==
- National Defence Medal
- Officer of the Order of Mono
- Grand Officer of the National Order of Benin
