= Military ranks of Benin =

The Military ranks of Benin are the military insignia used by the Benin Armed Forces. Being a former colony of France, Benin shares a rank structure similar to that of France.

== Commissioned officer ranks ==
The rank insignia of commissioned officers.

Rank group	General / flag officers				Senior officers			Junior officers
Benin Army
Benin Army	Général d'armée	Général de corps d'armée	Général de division	Général de brigade	Colonel	Lieutenant-colonel	Commandant	Capitaine	Lieutenant	Sous-lieutenant
Benin Navy
Benin Navy	Amiral	Vice-amiral d'escadre	Vice-amiral	Contre-amiral	Capitaine de vaisseau	Capitaine de frégate	Capitaine de corvette	Lieutenant de vaisseau	Enseigne de vaisseau de 1^{ère} classe	Enseigne de vaisseau de 2^{ème} classe
Rank group	General / flag officers				Senior officers			Junior officers

== Other ranks ==
The rank insignia of non-commissioned officers and enlisted personnel.

Rank group	Senior NCOs					Junior NCOs		Enlisted
Benin Army
Benin Army	Major	Adjudant-chef	Adjudant	Sergent-chef	Sergent	Caporal-chef	Caporal	Soldat de 1^{ère} classe	Soldat de 2^{ème} classe
Benin Navy									No insignia
Benin Navy	Major	Maître principal	Premier maître	Maître	Second maître	Quartier maître de 1^{er} classe	Quartier maître 2^{ème} classe	Matelot de 1^{ère} classe	Matelot de 2^{ème} classe
Rank group	Senior NCOs					Junior NCOs		Enlisted
