= Belhassen Trabelsi =

Tunisian businessman (born 1962)

- Born: 5 November 1962 (age 63); Tunis, Tunisia
- Occupation: Businessman
- Political party: Constitutional Democratic Rally
- Spouse: Zohra Djilani
- Children: 5

Belhassen Trabelsi (Arabic: بلحسن الطرابلسي; born 5 November 1962) is a Tunisian businessman. He is the brother of Leïla Ben Ali, wife of former President Zine El Abidine Ben Ali.

== Career ==
He sat on the Board of Banque de Tunisie. He owned 65% of KoralBlue Airlines. He also owned the Groupe Karthago, including Karthago Airlines and Kathago Hotels. He became the CEO of Nouvelair in 2008. He was a senior official in the now defunct Constitutional Democratic Rally.

Rumors were widespread about his arrest in Tunisia on 14 January 2011, as he was trying to flee Tunisia and meet with family members in Lyon, France. His house in La Soukra, 10 miles (16 km) away from Tunis, has been looted.

However, he later escaped to Montreal, Canada. On 28 January 2011, Canadian foreign affairs minister Lawrence Cannon was quoted as having said that Trabelsi was no longer welcome in Canada and was to be arrested. However, Cannon also went on to say that Trabelsi has applied for refugee status and is therefore entitled to 'due process' under Canadian law, which could take years to settle.

In May 2016, Belhassen Trabelsi was found to be missing by Canadian authorities. He was scheduled to be deported to Tunisia the following day, on 31 May 2016, to start the arbitration process with the Tunisian Truth and Dignity Commission. In 2019, Belhassen Trabelsi was arrested in Marseille, France, due to his illegal entry and money laundering, then he was released on a bail. In June 2020, a court in Aix-en-Provence demanded to hand him over to Tunisian authorities.

In January 2021, the Investigation Chamber of the Aix-en-Provence Court of Appeal rejected Tunisia's request to extradite Belhassen Trabelsi. In its judgment, the Court noted not only Belhassen Trabelsi's age and state of health, but also "a real risk of inhuman and degrading treatment for Belhassen Trabelsi and of inadequate controls in the event of ill-treatment in detention".
