= LH Aviation =

French aircraft manufacturing company

LH Aviation was a French aircraft manufacturing company, founded in 2004 and located in Melun-Villaroche. LH Aviation developed the LH-10 Ellipse.

== History ==
The company was founded in 2004 by Sébastien Lefebvre as a manufacturer of ultralight single and two-seater carbon fibre aircraft. A prototype of the first airplane was created that year by Frédéric Hubschwerlenson and Lefebvre.

Their plane, the LH-10, has multiple versions including automated and training planes. The LH-10 was shown at the 2009 Le Bourget Paris Air Show.

In 2015 the company had about 50 employees in Villaroche, France, including one dedicated pilot.

Over the years the company raised capital from investors in different countries, including Mohsine Karim-Bennani from Morocco, who wanted to create a Moroccan subsidiary and a manufacturing plant in Casablanca. However the two sides ended up in court and the collaboration was cancelled.

Lefebvre left the company in July 2016.

After several years of insolvency, the company was placed in recovery in 2018, and judicial liquidation began in September 2019. The assets were bought by I-SEE Group, who commercialized the LH-10 and the LH-D as IC-10 and IC-D, respectively.

== Key dates ==
- May 2004: LH Aviation founded.
- September 2007: First flight of the LH-10 prototype at the Avia International Airshow.
- March 2008: Joined the Aerospace Cluster Activity at Melun-Villaroche.
- 2007: Exposure of the LH-10 prototype on the Champs Elysees during the Festival of Transport..
- July 2008: Attendance at Farnborough Airshow.
- June 2010: Financial and operational backing from Aeronautic Investment Fund Magellan Industries.
- June 2009, 2011, 2013: Participation in the 49th, 50th and 51st Paris Air Shows.
- October 2011: First formation: Saget Promotion Official delivery of the first two surveillance airplanes by the Air Force Benin.
- August 2012: First flight of the LH-10 Ellipse Surveillance Advanced version.
- 2012: Participation in Euronaval and Eurosatory.
- 2012: Recruitment of military competence internally, participation in the Paris Air Show.
- May 2013: First rocket launch performed from the LH-10 Ellipse.
- April 2014: Set up of the Moroccan subsidiary.
- December 2014: Use of the LH-10 by the French border police.
- January 2015: Creation of the Explorair 45.
- February 2015: Creation of the outsourcing department.
- 21 October 2018: Judicial liquidation

== Products ==
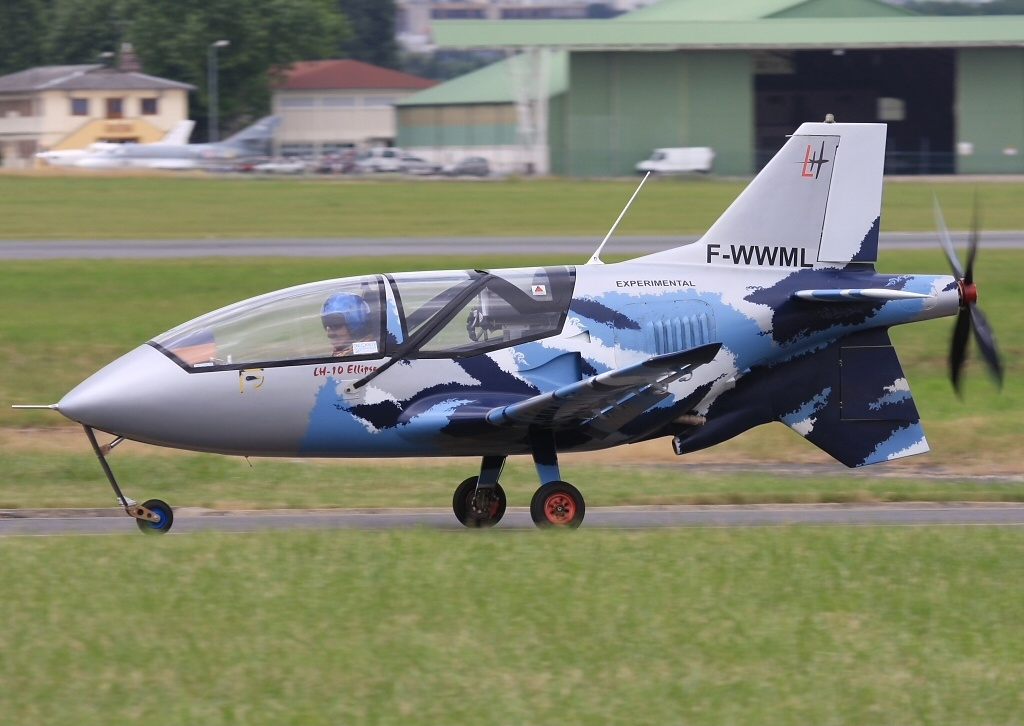
LH-10 Ellipse at Le Bourget - 2009

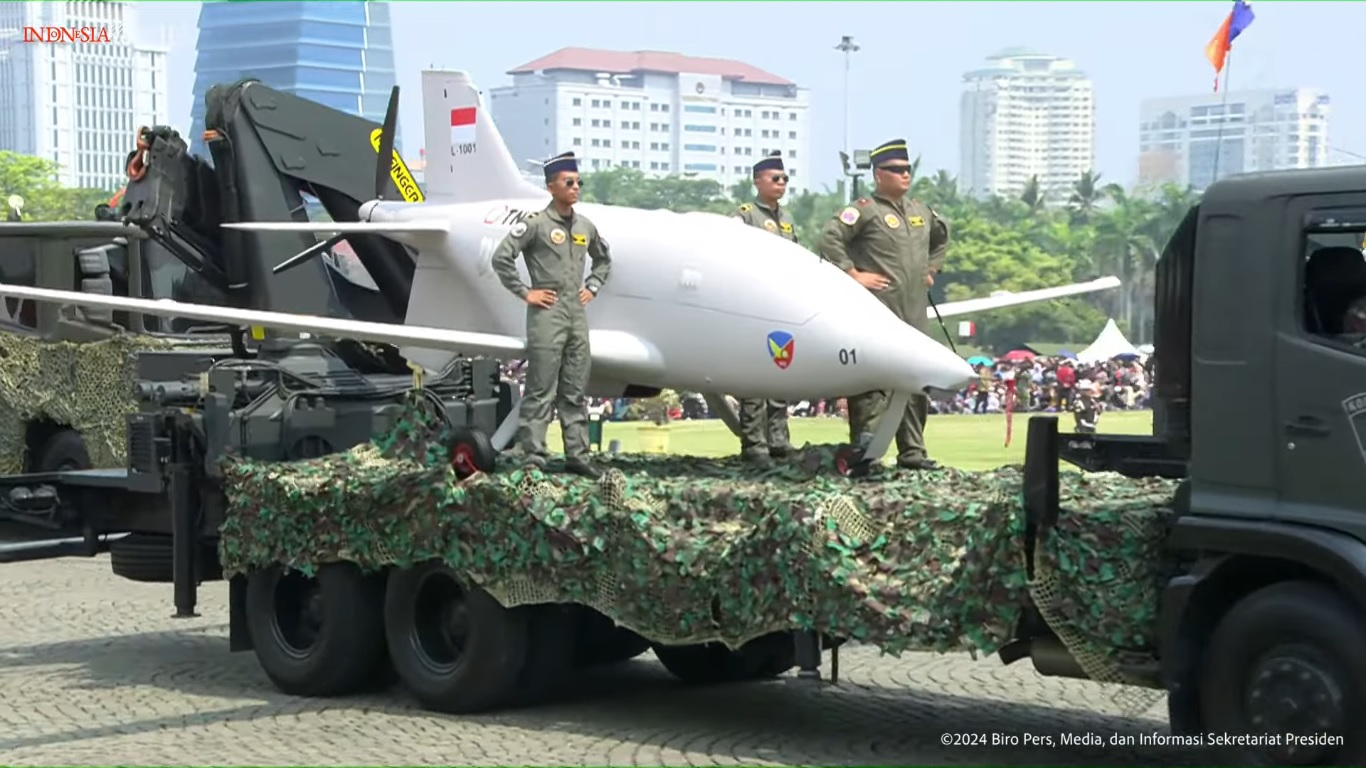
LH-D of the Indonesian Air Force

=== LH-10 Ellipse ===
The LH-10 Ellipse is for training and pilot training; it has a tandem configuration and a glass cockpit.

=== LH-10 Guardian ===
The LH-10 Guardian is intended for surveillance missions.

=== LH-10 Elfe ===
The LH-10 Elfe is a military aircraft with an airborne collision avoidance system.

=== LH-D ===
The LH-D is an unmanned aerial vehicle made from carbon fibre. It has an OPV option.
