= Benin Air Force =

Air warfare branch of Benin's military

- Forces Aériennes du Benin
- Country: Republic of Benin
- Type: Air force
- Role: Aerial warfare
- Part of: Benin Armed Forces
- Headquarters: Cotonou

Commanders
- Current commander: Lieutenant-colonel Hermann William Avocanh

Insignia
- Roundel

- Fin flash

Aircraft flown
- Multirole helicopter: Eurocopter AS332 Super Puma
- Utility helicopter: Eurocopter AS350 Fennec
- Transport: Xi'an MA600

The Benin Air Force (French: Forces Aériennes du Bénin or FAB) is the aerial service branch of the Benin Armed Forces. It was formed in 1960 when Benin gained independence from France as the Dahomey Air Force. The Air Force provides support to the army and various transport duties, including presidential transportation. It has relied heavily on donations, initially from France and more recently from Belgium. During the short lived People's Republic of Benin, when it was known as the Benin People's Air Force, Soviet aircraft were acquired to demonstrate the change of political allegiance. In the 2020s, new capability was acquired to support counterterrorism activities.

== History ==
=== Beginnings ===
When the Republic of Dahomey became a self-governing colony in the French Community on 11 August 1958, the colonial power provided the new country with a small nascent air arm named the Dahomey Air Force (Force Aérienne de Dahomey or FAD). The first aircraft arrived in 1961 after the country had gained full independence. The original donations, a Douglas C-47 transport and an Sud Aviation Alouette II helicopter along with a number of Max Holste Broussard utility aircraft, a similar package that France provided to many of its ex-colonies when they gained their freedom, were soon complemented by an Aero Commander 500B VIP transport. The C-47 fleet was expanded to three aircraft and, in 1973, a French-manufactured Rheims Cessna Skymaster was added to the force. To supplement the Aero Commander, an Aérospatiale Corvette was acquired, further reinforcing the tie between the country and French aircraft industry.

=== Benin People's Air Force ===
Roundel of the Benin People's Air Force

On 30 November 1975, the nation of Dahomey was renamed the People's Republic of Benin and the air force became the Benin People's Air Force (Forces Aériennes Populaire du Bénin or FAPB). A new roundel was introduced that included a red star to designate the new political allegiance of the country. Internally, however, little changed. The air force initially saw no new purchases except a single Fokker F27-600 added in 1978. Soon after, two Antonov An-26 transports were introduced, heralding a change in allegiance to the Eastern bloc.

During the next few years, the air force continued to expand but so did costs. To curb these, and to also support economic development in the country, in 1984, the Air Force started to jointly operate its larger transport aircraft with the national airline, Transports Aeriens de Benin. At the same time, the air force returned to procuring aircraft from West Europe. By 1987, the fleet included two An-26, three C-47s and two Dornier Do 128-2 transports, an Aero Commander 500B and Fokker F28 Fellowship for VIP transport, and a single Alouette II and two Aérospatiale AS350 Écureuil helicopters.

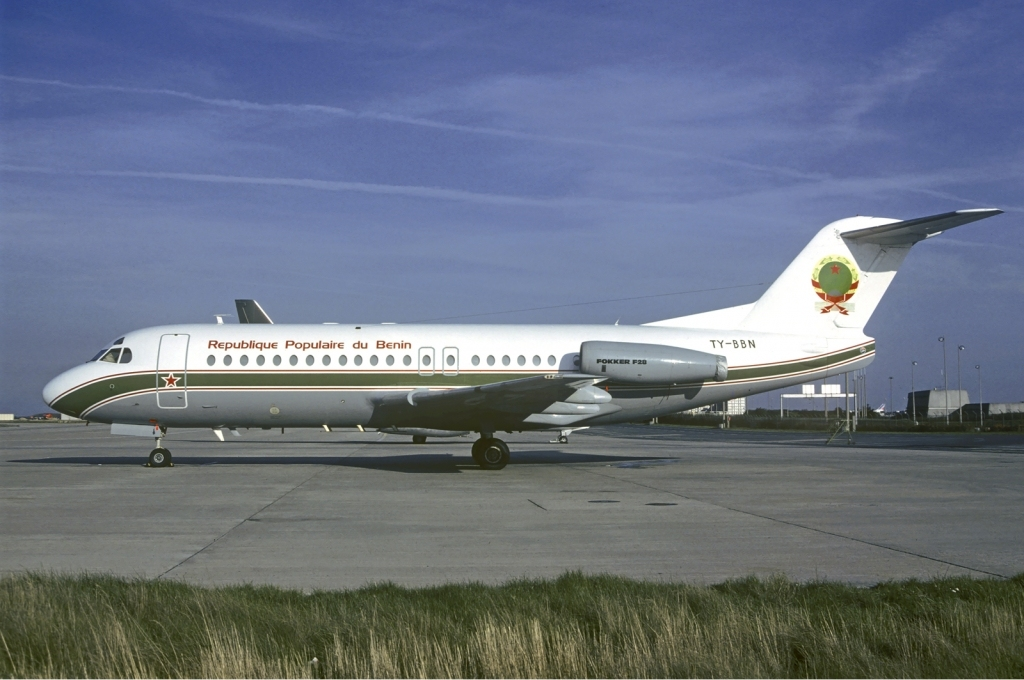
The Benin Air Force Fokker F28 in 1983

=== Benin Air Force ===
When the country's name was changed again on 1 March 1990 to the République du Bénin, the name of the air force was also renamed to the current name, Forces Aériennes du Bénin, which can be translated Benin Air Force. The original roundel was restored, although the red star was still visible on aircraft in 1994. Some things stayed the same. The air force continued to operate under financial constraints, which increasingly impacted serviceability. To help solve this, the country was provided aid from Belgium. The C-47 transports were retired, along with the remaining older aircraft. The Belgian Air Force provided a three-year service programme and also three Hawker Siddeley HS 748 transports. One of these was used for spare parts in an effort to provide continuity for the fleet, another recurring problem. Helicopters were also later provided by the Belgian Army under the same condition.

A de Havilland Canada DHC-6 Twin Otter utility aircraft joined the two An-26 transports in joint operation with the national airline and collaboration with civil aircraft operations became an increasingly important part of the way that the service operated. In 2010, the air force added a pair of LH Aviation LH-10 Grand Duc light aircraft in an attempt to reduce costs as well as add capability. However, despite these measures, the operational fleet continued to shrink. By 2018, the air force consisted of two active aircraft.

During the following decade, the Air Force was increasingly active in counterterrorism. This included involvement in joint counterterrorism exercises with other forces, both with other branches of the Benin armed forces and cooperation with other countries. To support these efforts, in 2023, the air force received two H125M variants of the Eurocopter AS350 Fennec and three Eurocopter Super Puma helicopters. By 2024, four AgustaWestland AW109BA and a single Eurocopter AS350B were added to the air force, which, alongside the other aircraft, meant that helicopters formed the majority of the fleet.

=== Current capabilities ===
The Air Force is tasked with a range of military tasks, including national defence, surveillance and intelligence gathering, support to the Army and participation in peacekeeping operations. It also undertakes a number of other roles, including search and rescue, environmental protection, anti-poaching patrols and fighting smuggling, as well as providing air transport for the president.

The Air Force is led by the Chief of Staff of the Air Force (Chef de d'Etat-Major des Forces Aériennes or CEMFA). On 14 November 2016, Lieutenant colonel Hermann William Avocanh was appointed to this role. Two bases are operated, Base Aériennes de Cotonou (BACO) and Base Aériennes de Cana (BACA) at Cadjehoun Airport, Cotonou, and Cana Airport respectively. In 2018, the latter was commanded by Captain Luc Biobou.

== Aircraft ==
Africa Defence Forum publication by U.S. Africa Command gave Benin Air Force inventory in September 2023 as follows: "three H215 Super Pumas and two H125Ms ... two AS550 Fennec helicopters ... The air force has only a few serviceable aircraft in use, namely one Mi-8 helicopter, single DHC-6 and MA600 transports, a couple of Humbert Tétras CSM light aircraft, and a BAe 748 transport."

Aircraft	Origin	Type	Variant	In service	Notes
Reconnaissance
Cessna 208	United States			1	Reconnaissance aircraft.
Transport
Beechcraft King Air 350	United States	Transport	350	1	
Xi'an MA600	China	Transport		1	
Helicopters
Eurocopter AS350 Fennec	France	Utility	H125M/AS350B	2	The two H125Ms are fitted with Trakka Systems TC-300 long-range high-definition electro-optical/infrared cameras
Eurocopter AS332 Super Puma	France	Multirole	H215(M)/AS332	3	
AgustaWestland AW109	Italy	Utility	BA	4	
Eurocopter AS550 Fennec	France		AS550	2	

The air force has also operated and retired the following aircraft:

- Aérospatiale Corvette.
- Aero Commander 500B.
- Antonov An-2.
- Antonov An-26.
- Boeing 727.
- Dassault Falcon 20.
- Dornier Do-28 Skyservant.
- Douglas C-47.
- Fokker F.28.
- Fokker F27-600.
- Hawker Siddeley HS 748.
- Humbert Tétras.
- LH Aviation LH-10 Grand Duc.
- Max Holste Broussard.
- Mil Mi-8.
- Rheims Cessna Skymaster.
- Sud Aviation Alouette II.

== Golf legend ==
There is a story that a golfer named Mathieu Boya destroyed the entire Benin Air Force in 1987 with a golf shot that led to one of the force's Dassault Mirage fighters crashing into the remaining four. Unfortunately for the story, the Benin Air Force has never operated the Mirage or any combat aircraft.
