= Cayman (scout car) =

Belarusian scout car

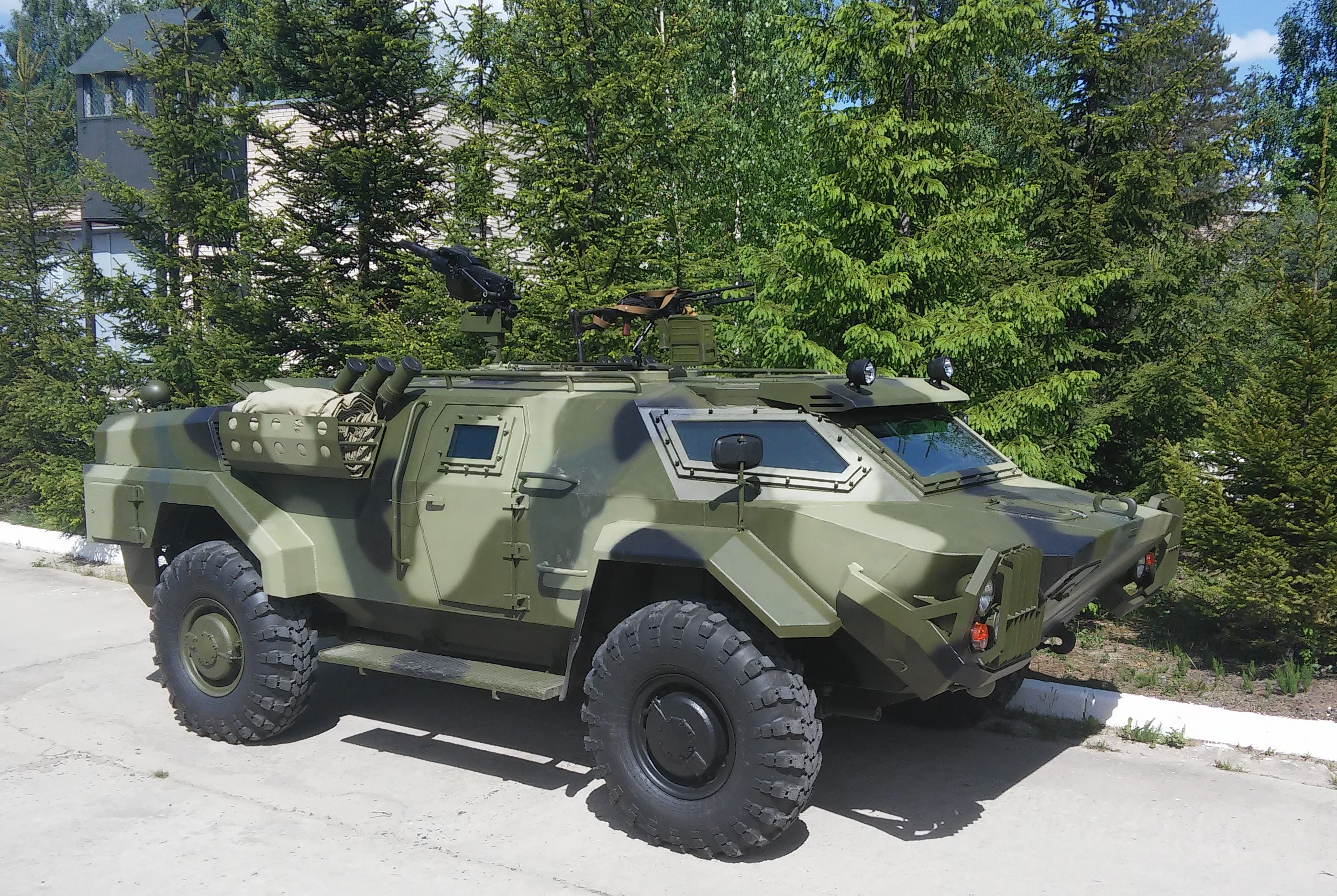
- Cayman scout car
- Type: Scout car
- Place of origin: Belarus

Service history
- In service: 2018-present
- Used by: Belarus; Ivory Coast; Sudan; Angola; Benin
- Wars: Sudanese civil war (2023–present)

Production history
- Designed: 2015
- Manufacturer: 140th repair plant
- Developed from: BRDM-2
- No. built: 70+

Specifications
- Mass: 7.5 to 8.5 tonnes
- Length: 6.53 m
- Width: 2.82 m
- Height: 2 m (without turret)
- Crew: 2
- Passengers: 4
- Armor: STANAG 4569 Level 2
- Main armament: PKTM, NSV, AGS-17, 2A42
- Engine: D-245 diesel 122 hp
- Suspension: Torsion bar 4x4
- Ground clearance: 400-490 mm
- Operational range: 1000 km
- Maximum speed: 100 km/h

The MBTS Cayman is a Belarusian scout car. The model was first presented in 2015 and by 2017 first deliveries were made. The vehicle is in use by Belarus and several African states.

== Development ==
The Cayman was developed at the 140th repair plant in Borisov under the leadership of the plant’s chief designer Olga Petrova in accordance with the instructions of the Belarusian president Alexander Lukashenko and was first presented in 2015. On 2 May 2017, A. Churyakov, Director of the 140th repair plant, announced in an interview that the plant had already built five armored vehicles, which had undergone testing with the 38th Separate Guards Airborne Assault Brigade in Brest and the 103rd Guards Airborne Brigade in Vitebsk and received positive feedback. The vehicles have been accepted into service with the Armed Forces of the Republic of Belarus.

On 7 August 2018, eight Cayman armoured vehicles were presented at a parade in Côte d'Ivoire.

On 15 February 2019, the first nine armored vehicles of this type were delivered to the Belarusian Armed Forces. They were transferred to the 103rd Separate Guards Airborne Brigade.

In December 2021, it was reported that due to European Union sanctions imposed on the 140th repair plant, deliveries of armor plates from Finland stopped, resulting in the production of Caymans being halted. However later deliveries to Benin suggest that production has continued.

== Description ==
Pre-production vehicles were built using the BRDM-2 armored hull. Production vehicles, however, use new Belarusian-made armored hulls. The independent torsion bar suspension, axles, and wheel reduction gears utilize components from the BTR-60. As of 2017 the Cayman consisted of 67% Belarusian components and the plant planned to increase this share.

=== Mobility ===
The Cayman is powered by a D-245 4-cylinder, liquid-cooled, turbocharged, in-line diesel engine with direct fuel injection, manufactured by the Minsk Motor Plant, with an electronic fuel management system and a five-speed transmission. A central tire inflation system is also available. The vehicle is capable of carrying six troops. The Cayman is capable of fording water obstacles thanks to new water propulsion systems with two propellers on the sides. The water jet engine allows the vehicle to accelerate to 7-8 km/h on water.

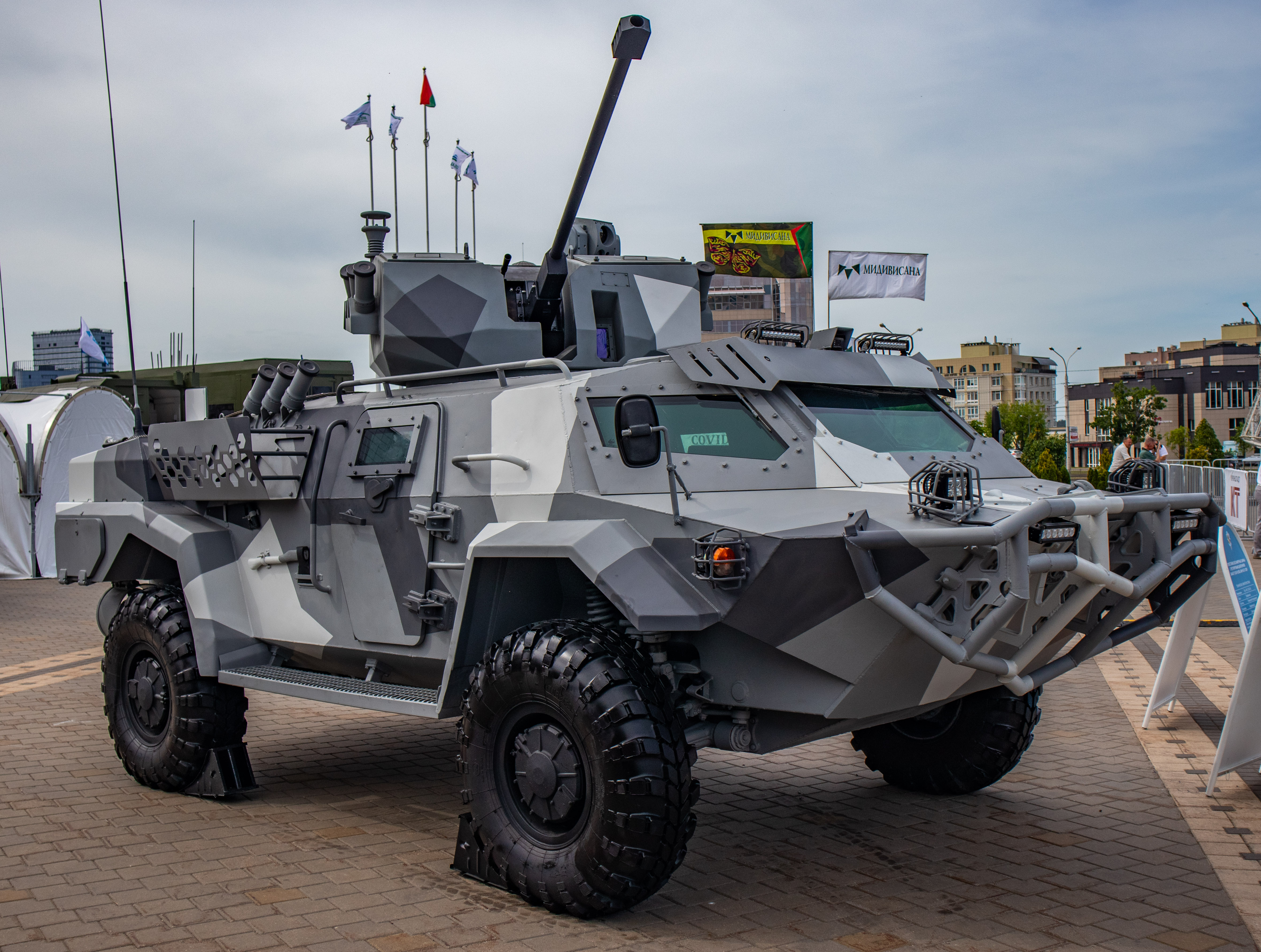
The Cayman combat vehicle with the Adunok combat module and a 30mm 2A42 automatic cannon.

=== Armament ===
A weapon can be mounted on a rotating ring with a 7.62 mm PKMB machine gun (with 2,000 rounds of ammunition), a 12.7 mm NSVT machine gun (with 300 rounds of ammunition) or a 30 mm AGS-17 grenade launcher (with 174 rounds of ammunition). In addition, six 81 mm smoke grenade launchers are installed. In May 2017, it was announced that it would be possible to install the Adunok combat module om the Cayman.

=== Protection ===
The armor, manufactured to class 5 protection, withstands armor-piercing incendiary bullets fired from the SVD sniper rifle. The bottom is V-shaped and reinforced with armor. Cameras are installed front and rear of the vehicle.

== Operators ==
- Belarus: nine Cayman MBTS units as of 15 February 2019.

As of May 2022, more than 60 units were in the possession of foreign customers, including:

- Ivory Coast: Eight Cayman MBTS units as of August 2018.
- Sudan: Unspecified number as of November 2021.
- Angola: Several vehicles were displayed at a military parade in November 2022.
- Benin: Nine units were displayed at a military parade on 1 August 2025.

== Gallery ==
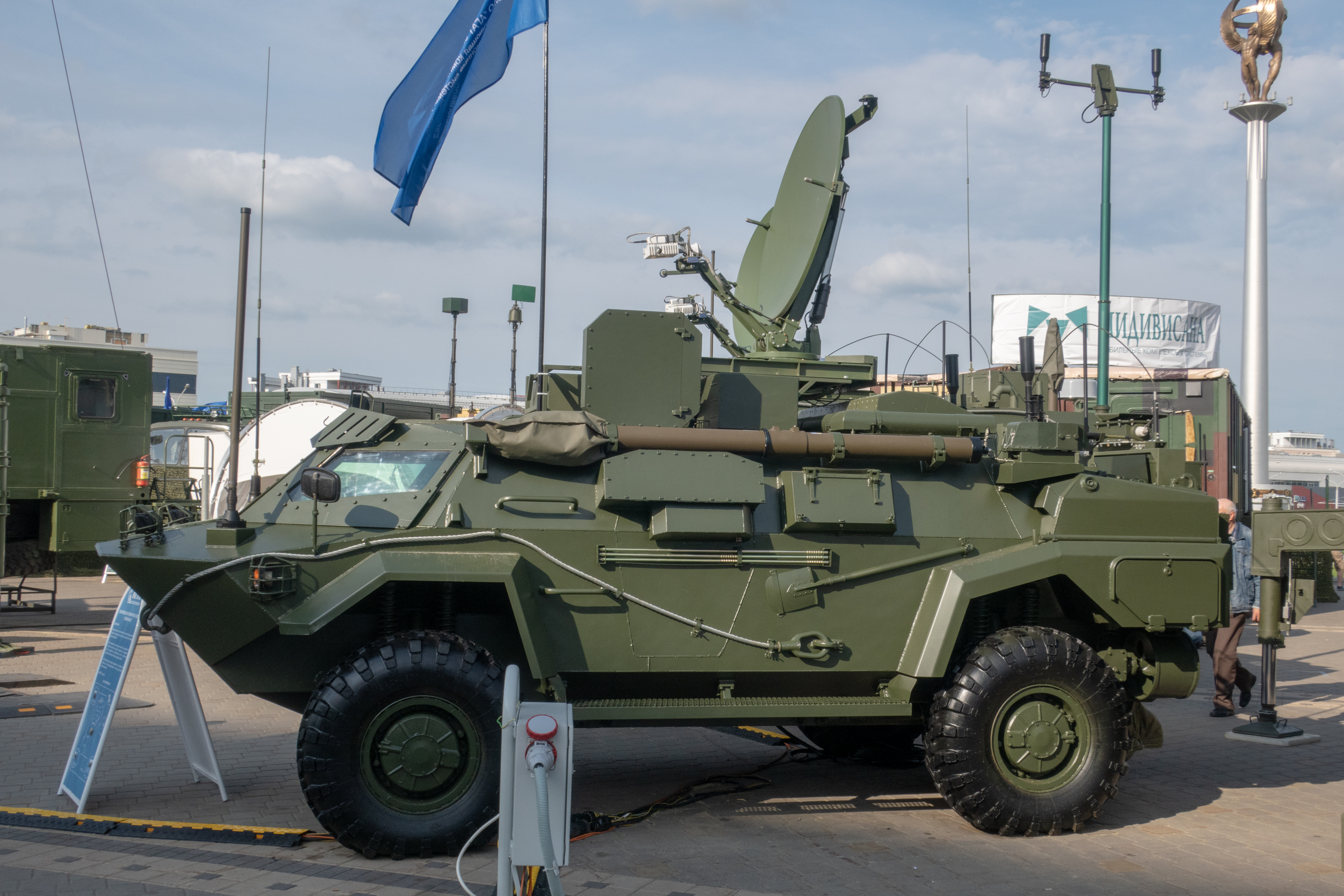
Communication vehicle

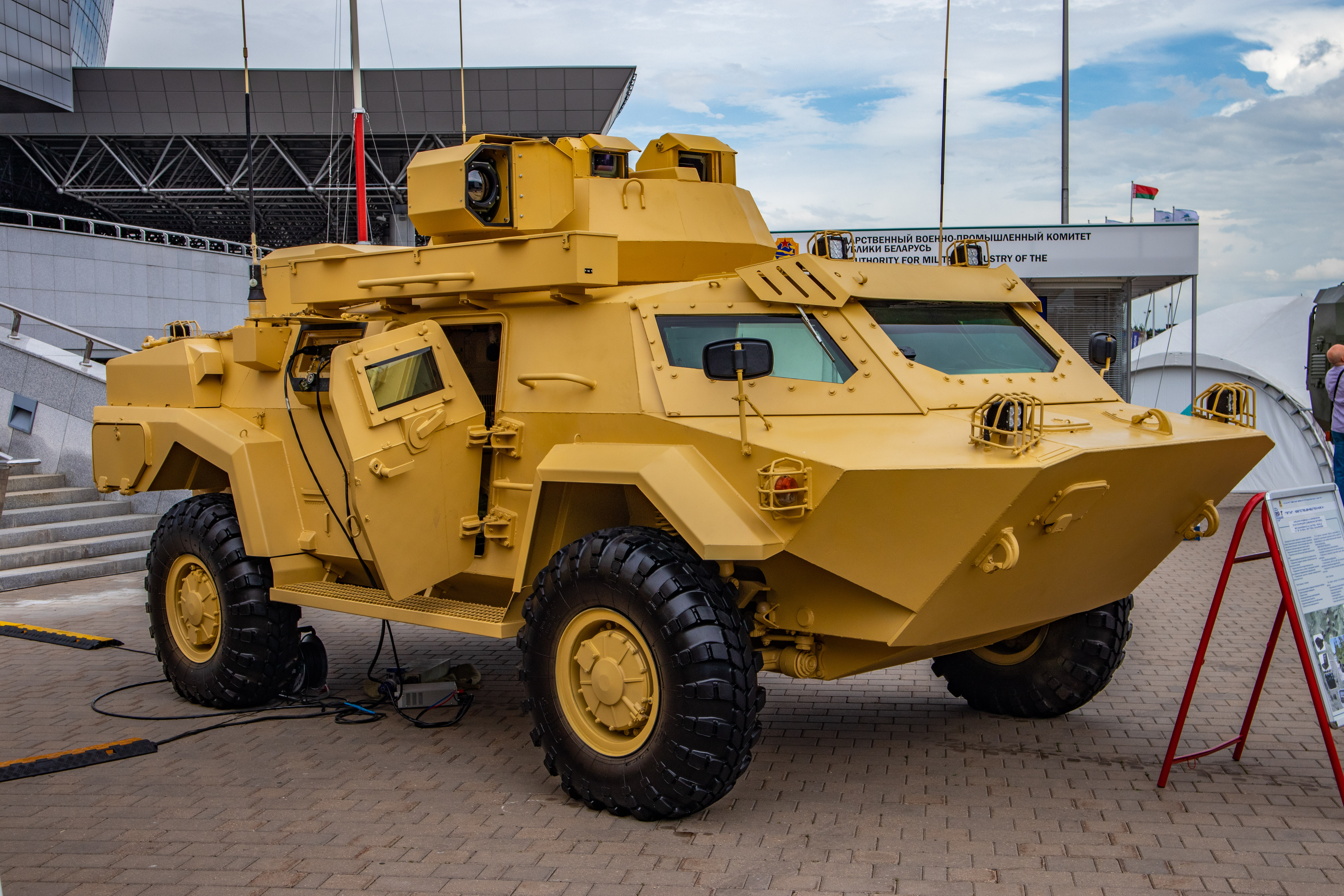
Artillery C2 veheicle

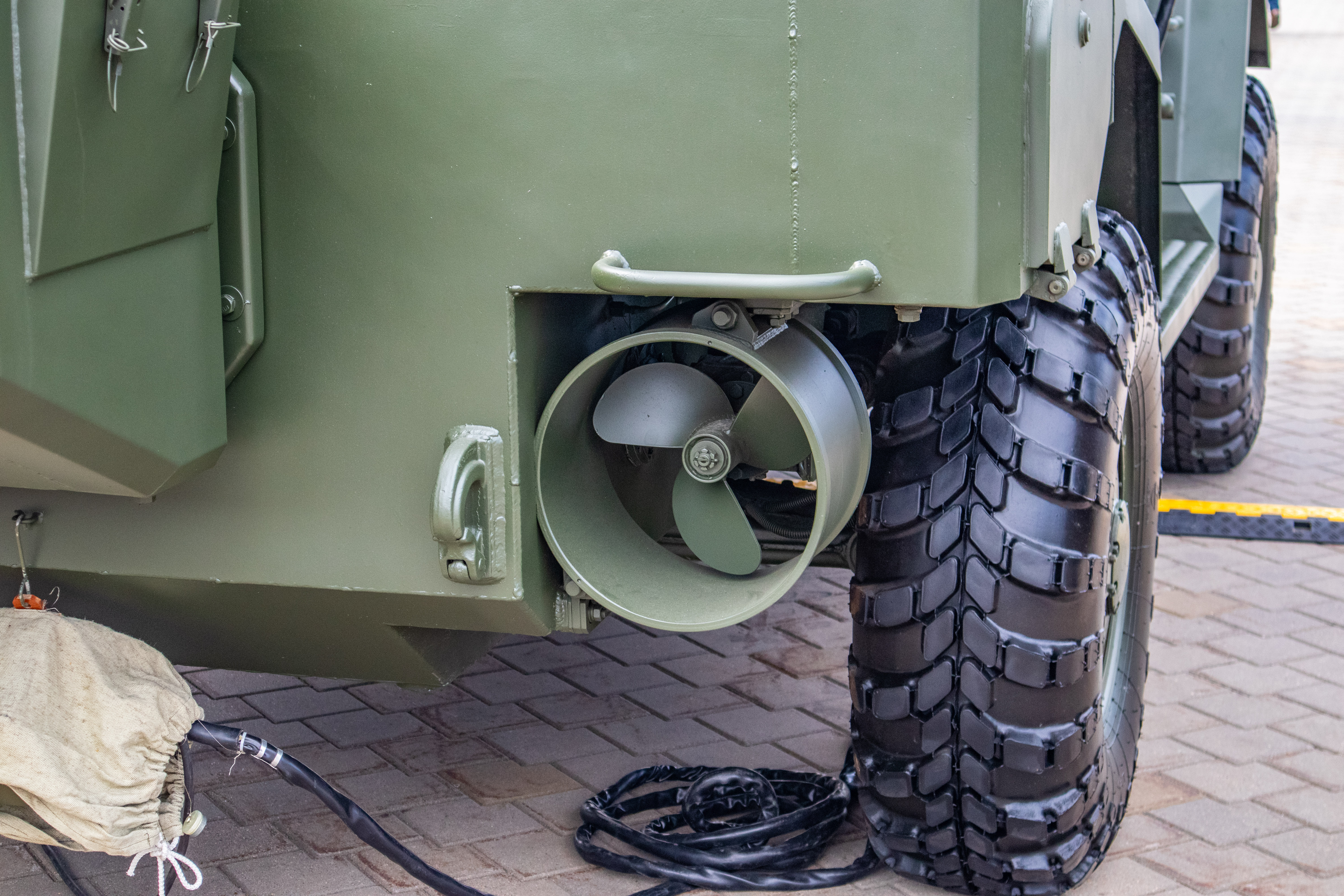
Pump-jet propulsion
