= EvertekTunisie =

Company

Evertek's Logo

Evertek is a Tunisian mobile phone manufacturer. Evertek is a trademark of Cellcom, which in turn is part of the Tunisian company YKH Group. Evertek was founded in 2008. Evertek produced several mobile phones (Dual and triple SIM) and is gaining progressive access to the Tunisian market.

As of 2010, Evertek handsets had 10% market share in Tunisia, and are also sold in Morocco, France, and on British Airways, KLM and Virgin Atlantic flights. In January 2018, Evertek launched V4 Nano smartphone. In June 2018, Evertek launched new Android smartphone V8 curved.
