= Mégrine =

Mégrine مقرين
- Commune and town
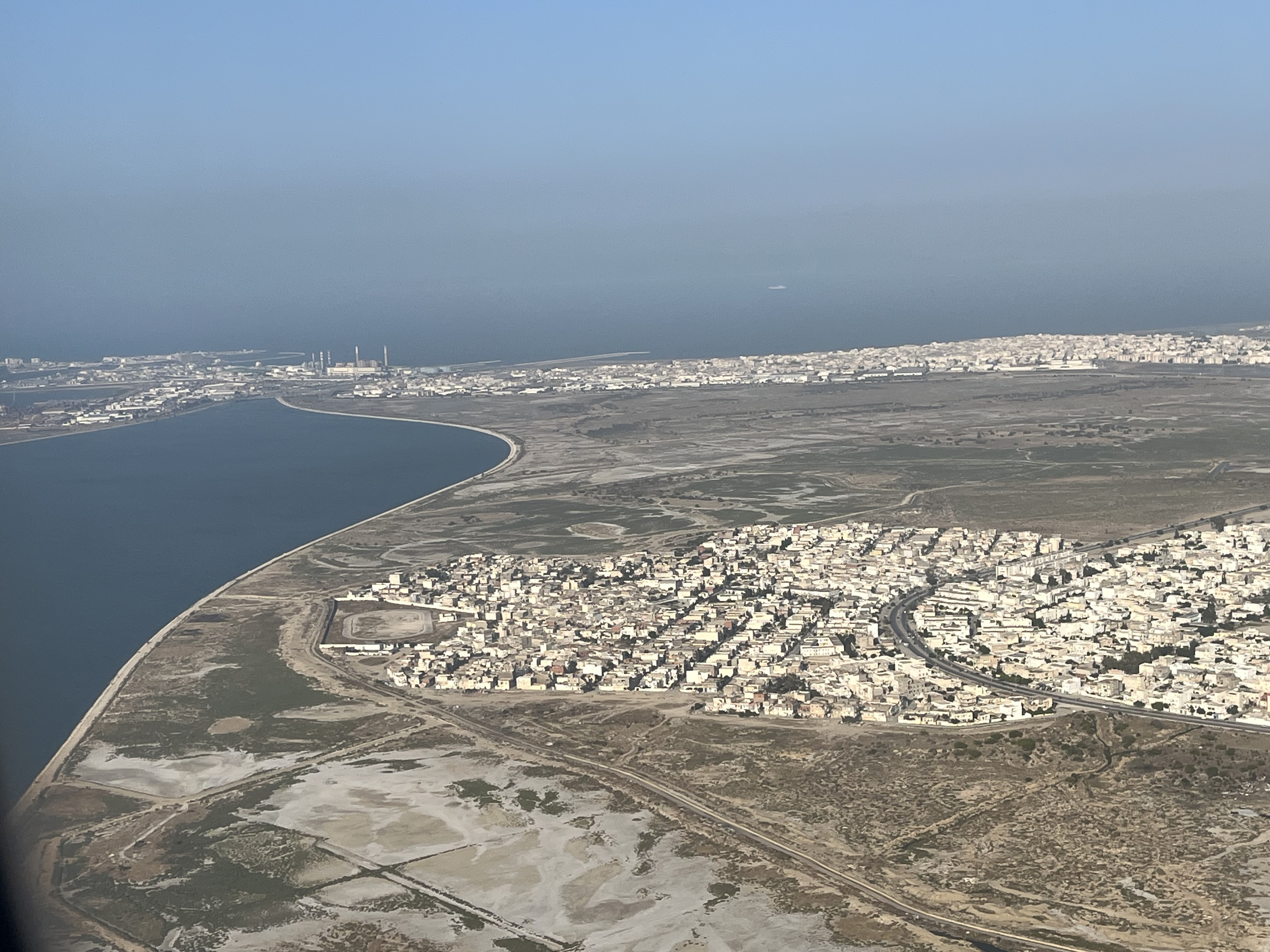
- Aerial view of Mégrine
- Interactive map of Mégrine
- Country: Tunisia
- Governorate: Ben Arous Governorate

Area
  - Total: 14.86 km^{2} (5.74 sq mi)

Population (2024)
  - Total: 25,863
  - Density: 1,740/km^{2} (4,508/sq mi)
- Census (RGPH 2024)
- Time zone: UTC+1 (CET)
- Website: http://www.commune-megrine.gov.tn/

Mégrine (Arabic: مقرين) is a town and commune in the Ben Arous Governorate, Tunisia. It has the head office of Monoprix, Tunisia.

== History ==
Mégrine was established following the subdivision of the Mégrine estate, an agricultural and viticultural operation managed by the Société Anonyme du Domaine de Mégrine. At the beginning of the 20th century, Count Foy, one of the representatives of the company, oversaw the continuation of the estate's operations until 1924, when, facing financial ruin, the estate was put up for sale. A group of Italians made purchase offers, which the Count accepted. However, the Tunisian state—through the Department of Agriculture—rejected the offers and acquired the estate in 1924.

The estate was then sold off in parcels: first as suburban lots intended for agricultural use starting in 1925, followed by urban and garden lots on other parts of the estate. These later formed the center of Mégrine and were eventually known as Mégrine-Coteaux. Workers from the estate settled near the lake. This area gradually developed with the arrival of settlers and the demographic growth of Tunis. It became one of the oldest inhabited parts of Mégrine and was later designated as District No. 1, renamed Cité Chaker after independence.

The modern commune was officially created on July 1, 1948 (effective January 1, 1949), by merging the historic Mégrine area with Cité Lescure (a worker housing nucleus built in 1929 by the Agriculture Department for European laborers).

== Geography ==
Mégrine is a residential suburb bordering the southern edge of the Lake of Tunis, in the northern part of Ben Arous Governorate. It benefits from its proximity to central Tunis (about 5 km south) and forms part of the continuous urban fabric of Greater Tunis. The terrain includes hilly areas (reflected in names like Mégrine-Coteaux, meaning "hillside"). The commune covers approximately 14.86 km².

== Population ==
The population of the commune of Mégrine was 25,863 at the 2024 census (RGPH 2024, reference date November 6, 2024), reflecting a slight decline from 26,720 in 2014 (annual change -0.31%).

2014 Census (Municipal)
Homes	Families	Males	Females	Total
8011	7154	13064	13656	26720

== Economy ==
Mégrine is primarily residential and commuter-based, with residents working in nearby Tunis. It hosts the headquarters of Monoprix Tunisia and includes a small industrial zone with light manufacturing (e.g., past textile/confection activities). Economic challenges have included occasional factory closures affecting local employment. The area's suburban location supports access to Greater Tunis services and jobs.

== Notable features ==
- Proximity to the Lake of Tunis and Greater Tunis amenities.
- Historic sites include remnants of the original Mégrine estate and Château de Mégrine (a former colonial-era structure with Maltese ties).
- Community initiatives exist, such as local language and empowerment programs.

== See also ==
- List of cities in Tunisia
