= Cana Airport =

Airport in Zou, Benin

Bohicon/Cana Airport
- IATA: none; ICAO: DBBC

Summary
- Airport type: Public
- Serves: Bohicon
- Location: Benin
- Elevation AMSL: 548 ft / 167 m
- Coordinates: 7°7′31.5″N 2°2′48.5″E

Map
- Location of Bohicon/Cana Airport in Benin

Runways
Direction	Length		Surface
Direction	m	ft	Surface
04/22	2,576	8,450	ASPHALT
- Source: Landings.com

Bohicon/Cana Airport (ICAO: DBBC) is a public-use airport located 3 nm (nautical miles) south-southwest of Bohicon, Zou, Benin.
