= Monoprix (Tunisia) =

Société Nouvelle Maison de la Ville de Tunis
- Trade name: Monoprix Tunisia
- Traded as: BVMT: MNP
- ISIN: TN0001000108
- Industry: Retail
- Founded: 8 August 1933
- Headquarters: Mégrine, Tunisia
- Area served: Tunisia
- Key people: Nabil Chataoui (President)
- Owner: Groupe Mabrouk (64.9%); Tunisia Retail Group Holding (16.5%)
- Website: monoprix.tn

Société Nouvelle Maison de la Ville de Tunis, or SNMVT Monoprix (مونوبري), is a chain of grocery stores in Tunisia, with its head office in Mégrine. They are operated by the Groupe Mabrouk, which in 2007 had a 38% marketshare in Tunisia. It is listed on the Bourse de Tunis since April 1995.

Historically the company had ties with the Zine al-Abidine Ben Ali government.

== See also ==
- Monoprix (French stores)
