= Groupe Mabrouk =

Tunisian retail company

Groupe Mabrouk (مجموعة المبروك) is a Tunisian retail company. It operates SNMVT Monoprix and Géant stores, under license from Groupe Casino. It is one of three major supermarket operators in Tunisia. In 2007 it had a 38% marketshare in Tunisia. In November 2023, Marwane Mabrouk, CEO of the group, was imprisoned as part of an investigation into suspicions of financial corruption in the management of a company confiscated by the State of Tunisia..
