= Integration Objects =

Software development firm

- Industry: IT; Software development System integration Automation; Consulting; Training
- Founded: 2002; 24 years ago
- Headquarters: Tunis, Tunisia; Houston, Texas
- Key people: Samy Achour, President and Founder
- Products: systems integration, knowledge management platforms, OPC software products, connectivity consulting
- Website: www.integrationobjects.com

Integration Objects is an industrial software company that develops software solutions for industrial connectivity, operational technology (OT), IT-OT integration, industrial internet of things (IIoT), supervisory control and data acquisition (SCADA), industrial cybersecurity, and industrial artificial intelligence (AI).

It develops OPC software products and knowledge management platforms for manufacturers primarily in the oil and gas, refining and petrochemicals, chemical, food and beverage, water and utilities, steel and pharmaceutical industries. It also provides consulting services.

Integration Objects is a member of the OPC Foundation, the International Society of Automation, Eclipse Foundation, Open Industry 4.0, and MIMOSA. It has also collaborated and partnered with other IT companies such as Emerson, Invensys, OSIsoft, Gensym, and ABB for large projects and its clients include ExxonMobil, Saudi Aramco and Solvay Chemicals.

== History ==
Integration Objects was founded in 2002 with a focus on industrial interoperability and data connectivity. The company's early products focused on OPC Classic technologies, providing secure communication solutions between industrial automation systems and software applications.

With the evolution of industrial communication standards, Integration Objects expanded its portfolio to support OPC Unified Architecture (OPC UA), industrial historians, MQTT communication, database integration, cloud connectivity, and web-based industrial visualization.

The company later developed the SIOTH® (Smart IoT Highway) platform, an industrial software platform designed to support industrial data integration, visualization, monitoring, cybersecurity, and analytics.

== Products ==
Integration Objects develops software products for industrial automation, connectivity, data management, and digital transformation.

Its product portfolio includes:

- SIOTH® (Smart IoT Highway), an industrial software platform that provides capabilities for IT/OT integration, industrial connectivity, SCADA, visualization, historian functionality, cybersecurity, and industrial AI applications.
- OPC UA Universal Server, OPC UA Server software for exposing industrial and enterprise data through OPC UA interfaces.
- OPC UA Wrapper, plug and play software designed to provide OPC UA connectivity for existing OPC Classic applications.
- OPCNet Broker®, an OPC tunneling product designed to facilitate and secure OPC Classic connectivity across distributed environments.
- OPC Easy Archiver, plug and play OPC Client software for collecting and storing industrial data in databases and files.
- OPC Server for Databases, software that enables database data to be accessed through OPC interfaces.
- MQTT Universal Broker, broker software for industrial MQTT communication and data exchange.
- OPC UA Client Toolkit and OPC UA Server Toolkit, software development tools for creating OPC UA client and server applications using .NET.
- OPC .NET Client Toolkit, a development toolkit for .NET-based OPC applications.

The company's software products support secure communication between industrial devices, programmable logic controllers (PLCs), distributed control systems (DCS), SCADA systems, historians, enterprise applications, and cloud platforms.

== Technology ==
Integration Objects develops software based on industrial communication standards and protocols, including:

- OPC Unified Architecture (OPC UA)
- OPC Classic
- MQTT
- Modbus
- DNP3
- IEC 60870-5-104
- SNMP
- BACnet
- Profinet
- EtherNet/IP

The company's technologies are used for industrial data acquisition, system integration, monitoring, data archiving, and secure communication between operational technology and information technology environments.

== SIOTH® Platform ==
SIOTH® (Smart IoT Highway) is an industrial software platform developed by Integration Objects for connecting and managing industrial data across OT, IT, and IIoT environments.

The platform includes components for industrial connectivity, unified visualization, SCADA, data historians, cybersecurity, and analytics. It supports integration between industrial systems, enterprise applications, edge devices, and cloud platforms.

== Industries ==
Integration Objects provides software solutions for industries including:

- Oil and gas
- Chemical and petrochemical
- Manufacturing
- Power generation and utilities
- Water and wastewater
- Mining and metals
- Food and beverage
- Pharmaceutical
- Transportation

== Standards and industry participation ==
Integration Objects participates in industrial automation and interoperability initiatives and has developed software based on standards maintained by organizations such as the OPC Foundation.

The company has also participated in industry organizations and events related to industrial automation, operational technology, and digital transformation.

== Research and development ==
Integration Objects' research and development activities focus on industrial interoperability, Industrial Internet of Things (IIoT), edge computing, industrial cybersecurity, data integration, and artificial intelligence applications for industrial environments.

The company develops software intended to support industrial digital transformation initiatives by enabling the collection, integration, and analysis of operational data.
