= Benin Armed Forces =

Military of Benin

- Forces Armées Béninoises
- Flag of the Benin Armed Forces
- Founded: 1960
- Service branches: Army; Navy; Air Force; Republican Guard

Leadership
- Commander-in-Chief: Romuald Wadagni
- Minister of Defence: Yarou Robert Theophile
- Chief of the Defence Staff: Fructueux Gbaguidi

Personnel
- Conscription: No
- Active personnel: 4,750

Expenditure
- Budget: $US73 million (2011)
- Percent of GDP: 1% (2011)

Industry
- Foreign suppliers: United States; Russia; France; China; South Africa; United Kingdom

Related articles
- Ranks: Military ranks of Benin

The Benin Armed Forces (French: Forces Armées Béninoises; FAB) constitutes the army, navy, air force, and republican guard of the Republic of Benin. For several years, the Belgian Armed Forces have had an active programme of co-operation with Benin, offering training and coaching, donating surplus military equipment, and conducting limited military exercises in the country.

== History ==
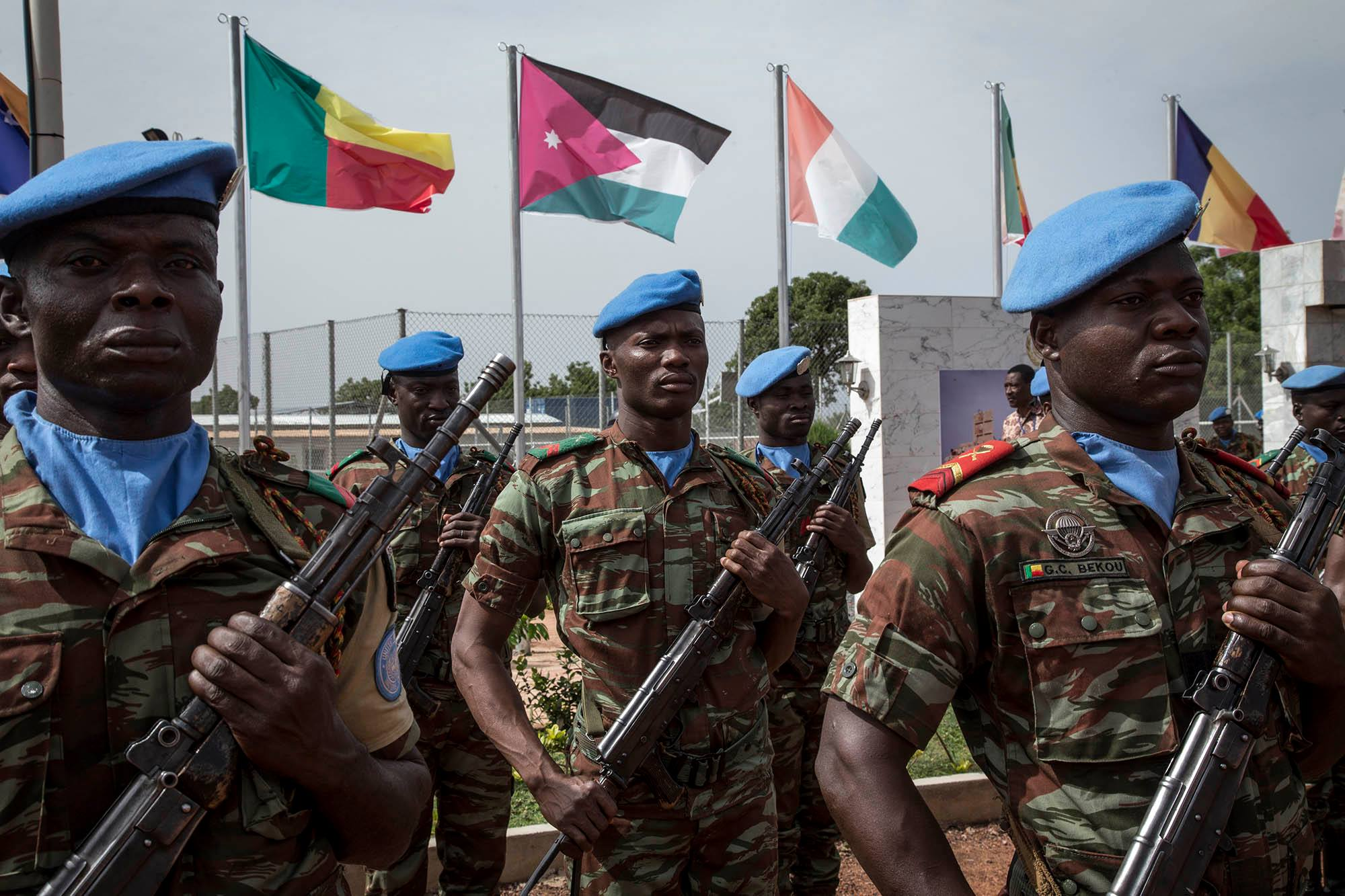
Beninese peacekeepers, part of the United Nations Multidimensional Integrated Stabilization Mission in Mali, 2018

The constitution of 11 December 1990 ordered the Benin Armed Forces to ensure effective, permanent, and efficient security coverage of the territory, as well as border vigilance.

The national gendarmerie no longer exists since 2018. It has been merged with the national police.

== Branches ==
=== Army ===
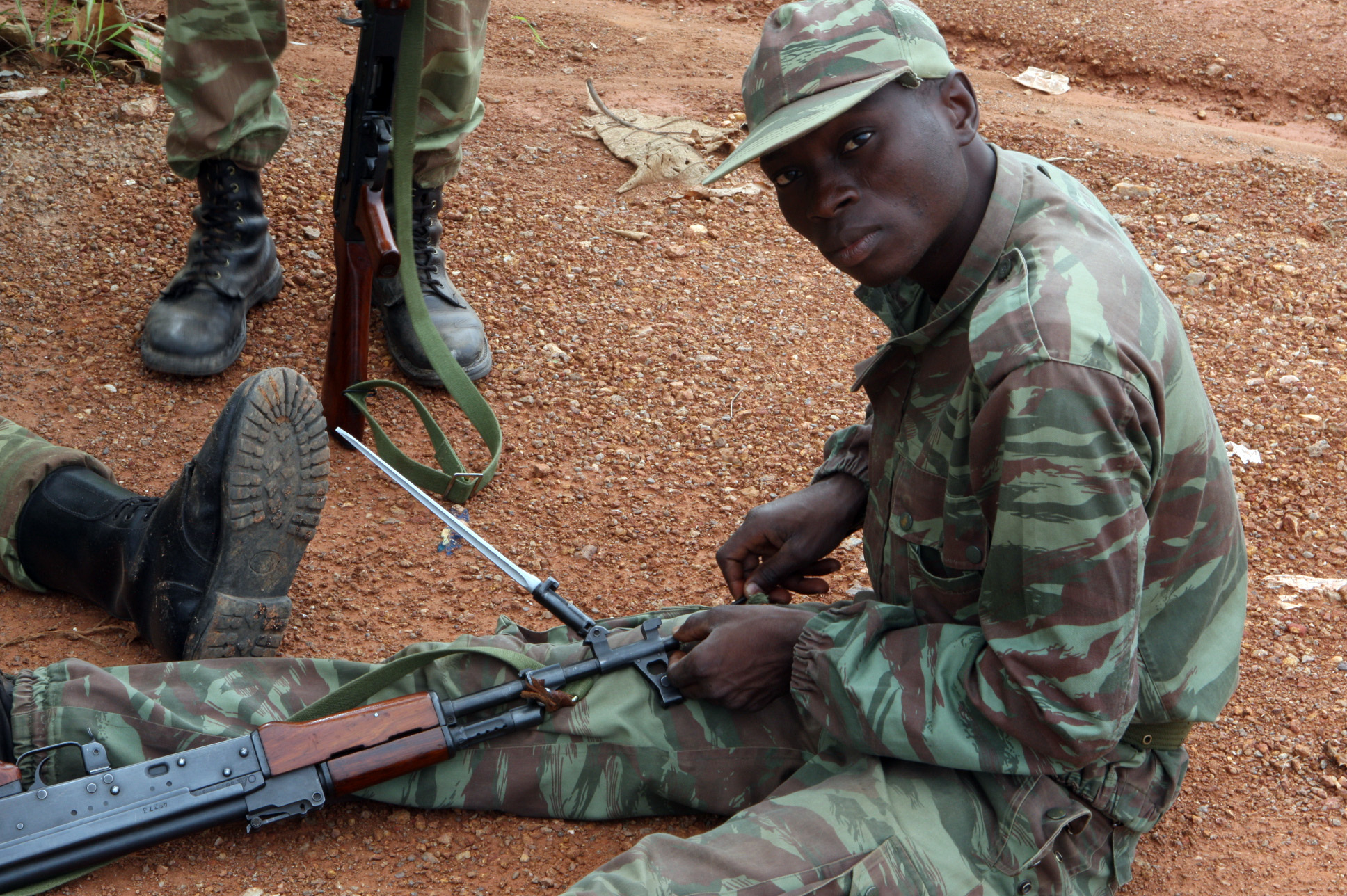
Beninese Army soldier on range at Bembèrèkè, 2012

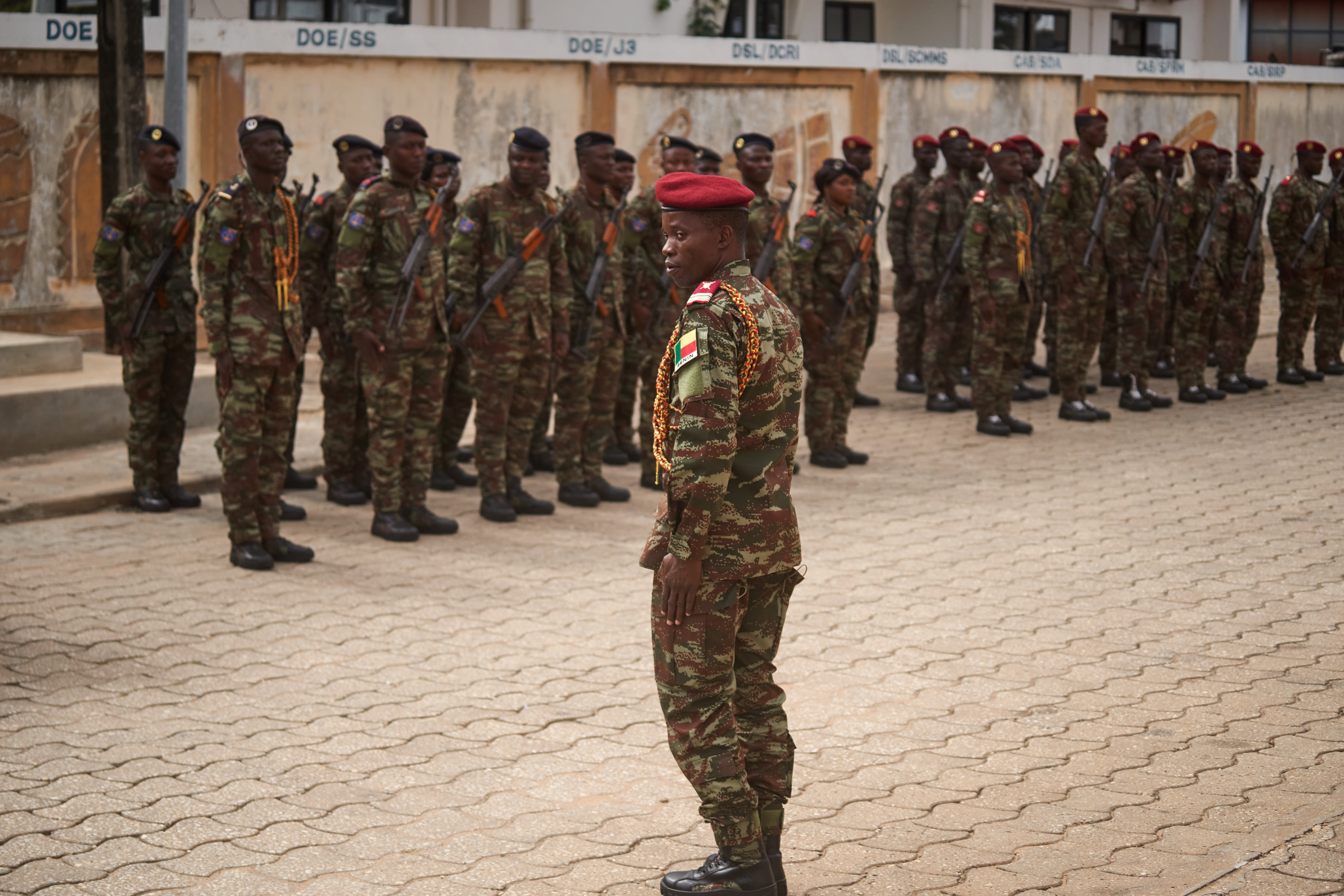
A Beninese military honor guard, 2025

As of 2012, the army had a strength of 4,300. It includes 1 armoured squadron, 3 infantry battalions, 1 commando/airborne battalion, 1 artillery battery, and 1 engineer battalion, and 1 National Fire Brigade. The army has the following units:

- 1st Parachute Commando Battalion
- 1st Motorized Intervention Battalion
- 1st Armoured Group
- National Group of Firefighters
- 1st Combined Arms Battalion
- 2nd Combined Arms Battalion
- 3rd Combined Arms Battalion
- 7th Combined Arms Battalion
- 8th Combined Arms Battalion
- 1st Mixed Artillery Battalion
- 1st Engineer Battalion
- 1st Signal Battalion
- 1st Materiel Battalion
- 1st Train Battalion
- Headquarters Group

=== Air Force ===
After achieving independence from France in 1960, the Benin Air Force was equipped with seven French-supplied Douglas C-47s, four MH.1521 Broussards and two Agusta-Bell 47Gs. Two F-27s entered service in 1978 for transport duties before being transferred to Air Benin. Also during the same era, two AN-26s were acquired. In late 1985, two Dornier Do-28s entered service to replace the C-47s. A single DHC-6 Twin Otter was acquired in 1989.

=== Navy ===
As of 2012, the navy had approximately 200 personnel. It operates two ex-Chinese patrol boats, which are designated the Matelot Brice Kpomasse class.

=== Republican Guard ===
The Republican Guard is responsible for the security of the President of the Republic, ministers, members of the government, institutions of the Republic, and their leader.

== Equipment ==
=== Small arms ===
Name	Image	Caliber	Type	Origin	Notes
Pistols
TT-30/33		7.62×25mm	Semi-automatic pistol	Soviet Union	
Submachine guns
MAT-49		9×19mm	SMG	France	
Rifles
AK		7.62×39mm	Assault rifle	Soviet Union	
AKM		7.62×39mm	Assault rifle	Soviet Union	
Type 56		7.62x39mm	Assault rifle	China	
Type 81		7.62×39mm	Assault rifle	China	
M16		5.56×45mm	Assault rifle	United States	
SKS		7.62×39mm	Semi-automatic rifle	Soviet Union	
MAS-49/56		7.5×54mm	Semi-automatic rifle	France	
Shotguns
Remington Model 1100		.410 bore	Semi-automatic shotgun	United States	
Machine guns
FM 24/29		7.5×54mm	LMG	France	
RP-46		7.62×54mmR	LMG	Soviet Union	
RPD		7.62×39mm	LMG	Soviet Union	
AA-52		7.62×51mm	GPMG	France	
M240G		7.62×51mm	GPMG	United States	
KPV		14.5×114mm	HMG	Soviet Union	
Browning M2		.50 BMG	HMG	United States	
Rocket propelled grenade launchers
RPG-7		40mm	RPG	Soviet Union	
Grenade launchers
LRAC F1		83mm	Shoulder-launched missile weapon	France	

=== Tanks ===
Name	Image	Type	Origin	Quantity	Notes
PT-76		Amphibious Light tank	Soviet Union	18	Delivered by Soviet Union from 1982

=== Scout cars ===
Name	Image	Type	Origin	Quantity	Notes
BRDM-2		Amphibious Scout car	Soviet Union	14	
MBTS Cayman		Scout car	Belarus	9	
Eland-90		Armored car Scout car	South Africa	3	
Panhard VBL		Scout car	France	10	Delivered by France from 1986
M8 Greyhound		Armored car Scout car	United States	7	

=== Armored personnel carriers ===
Name	Image	Type	Origin	Quantity	Notes
M113		Armoured personnel carrier	United States	22	
ACMAT Bastion		Armoured personnel carrier	France	2	
VAB		Armoured personnel carrier	France	15	

=== Mine-Resistant Ambush Protected ===
Name	Image	Type	Origin	Quantity	Notes
Casspir NG		MRAP	South Africa	10	

=== Artillery ===
Name	Image	Type	Origin	Quantity	Notes
Mortars
MO-81-61		Mortar	France	Unknown	
W-86		Mortar	China	Unknown	
Field artillery
L118		Howitzer	United Kingdom	12	
M101A1		Howitzer	United States	4	

=== Man-portable air-defense systems ===
Name	Image	Type	Origin	Quantity	Notes
9K32 Strela-2		MANPADS	Soviet Union		

== Bibliography ==
- International Institute for Strategic Studies (2024). "Chapter Eight: Sub-Saharan Africa". The Military Balance. 124 (1). Taylor & Francis: 458–531. doi:10.1080/04597222.2024.2298597. ISSN 0459-7222.
- Jones, Richard D.; Ness, Leland, eds. (2010). Jane's Infantry Weapons 2010-2011 (36th ed.). Janes Information Group. ISBN 978-0-7106-2908-1.
