= Karthago Airlines =

Tunisian airline

IATA	ICAO	Call sign
5R	KAJ	KARTHAGO
- Founded: 2001
- Ceased operations: 2010
- Operating bases: Djerba-Zarzis Airport; Tunis-Carthage International Airport
- Fleet size: 1
- Destinations: 3
- Parent company: Karthago Group
- Headquarters: Tunis, Tunisia
- Key people: Belhassen Trabelsi

Notes
- Merged into Nouvelair

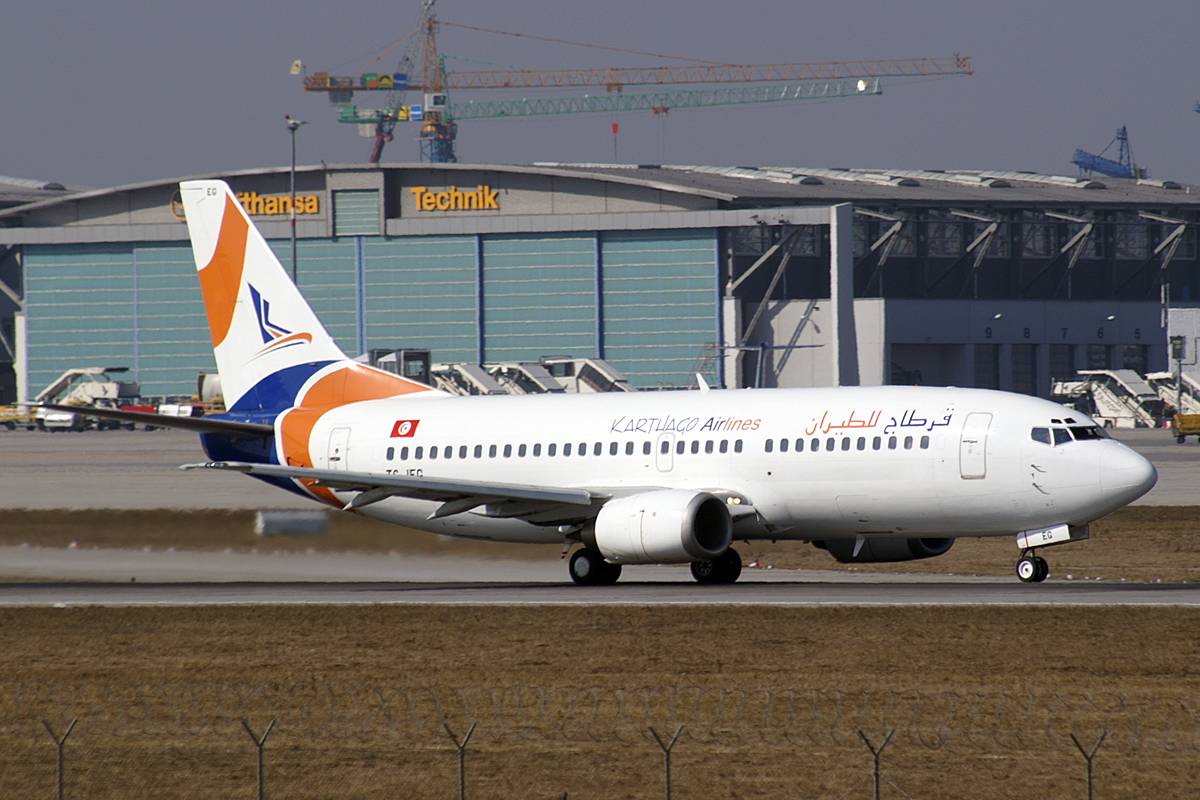
A Karthago Airlines Boeing 737-300 at Stuttgart Airport (2006).

Karthago Airlines was a privately owned airline based in Tunis, Tunisia, operating scheduled charter flights to Europe. Its main base was in Djerba-Zarzis Airport, but most of the flights were out of Tunis-Carthage International Airport. It was merged into Nouvelair Tunisia in January 2011.

== History ==
The airline was established in 2001 and was owned by the Karthago Group (58 percent) and banks, insurers and tour trade investors (42 percent).

== Destinations ==
For the winter season 2010/11, Karthago Airlines was contracted to serve the following destinations on a regular, scheduled basis:

- Denmark
  - Copenhagen - Copenhagen Airport
- Sweden
  - Stockholm - Stockholm-Arlanda Airport
- Tunisia
  - Tunis - Tunis-Carthage International Airport base
