= Syphax Airlines =

Airline of Tunisia

IATA	ICAO	Call sign
Y3	SYA	SYPHAX
- Founded: 2011; 2018 (restart)
- Ceased operations: 2023
- Hubs: Sfax–Thyna International Airport
- Secondary hubs: Tunis–Carthage International Airport
- Fleet size: 3
- Destinations: 14
- Headquarters: Sfax, Tunisia
- Key people: Mohamed Frikha
- Website: flysyphaxairlines.com

Syphax Airlines was a charter airline with its head office and main base at Sfax–Thyna International Airport in Sfax, Tunisia. Between 2011 and 2015, the airline operated as a scheduled carrier and served destinations in the Mediterranean.

== History ==
The airline was incorporated as a limited company in 2011 by businessman Mohamed Frikha, Founder and CEO of Telnet, with a capital of 10 million dinars ($6.3m). Originally the airline planned to operate services only from Sfax, but the Tunisian aviation authorities gave them permission to fly from all airports in Tunisia. The first scheduled services were launched on 29 April 2012 using two Airbus A319 aircraft. Despite growth in services and passenger numbers the airline had after-tax losses of 14.53m dinars ($9.2m) in the first year of operation.

In December 2012, an Airbus A330-200 lease contract was announced and the aircraft delivered in June 2013, eventually operating services to Montreal. These widebody operations came to an end in 2015 with the return of the aircraft to its lessor. On 15 January 2013 the airline ordered 3 Airbus A320neo and 3 A320ceo narrowbody aircraft, at a list price of some $600m and with delivery starting in 2015. These orders were cancelled in June and August 2015 respectively due to the airline's deteriorating financial situation.

In July 2015, Syphax Airlines suspended all operations stating financial difficulties. However, the airline announced a resumption of services by September 2015 after sourcing new funding.

In September 2018, it was announced the airline would restart operations in Spring 2019. Initially, the carrier would offer its two ex-Air Nostrum CRJ900ERs for wet-lease services during the Winter 2018/19 season, ahead of the launch of its own routes in March or April 2019. The carrier intends to connect Tunis, Djerba, and Sfax to destinations in North Africa and Europe, with Paris and Toulouse Blagnac floated as the first routes. The airline also intends to add narrowbody aircraft to further boost its network in the region and offer sixth-freedom services between Africa and Europe via Tunisia.

In January 2019, the airline was granted a new Air Operator's Certificate (AOC) by the Tunisian Ministry of Transport. The certificate was issued on 3 January 2019 and is signed by Habib Mekki, the director general of civil aviation at the ministry. Syphax's founder, Mohamed Frikha, previously stated the company planned to soft-launch as a wet-lease operator once it received its AOC. The initial phase would see the airline's two Bombardier CRJ900s flown on behalf of an external partner in Africa. The wet-lease contract will bring in revenue while the airline finalises its own traffic rights – a process that is expected to take about five months. Scheduled flights will then begin under the Syphax brand, with services planned from Tunis, Sfax and Djerba to Algeria, France, Italy and Spain.

In December 2023, the airline officially ceased operations and was declared bankrupt. Following the freezing of its accounts and the arrest of its founder, the company’s partner withdrew along with its fleet.

== Fleet ==
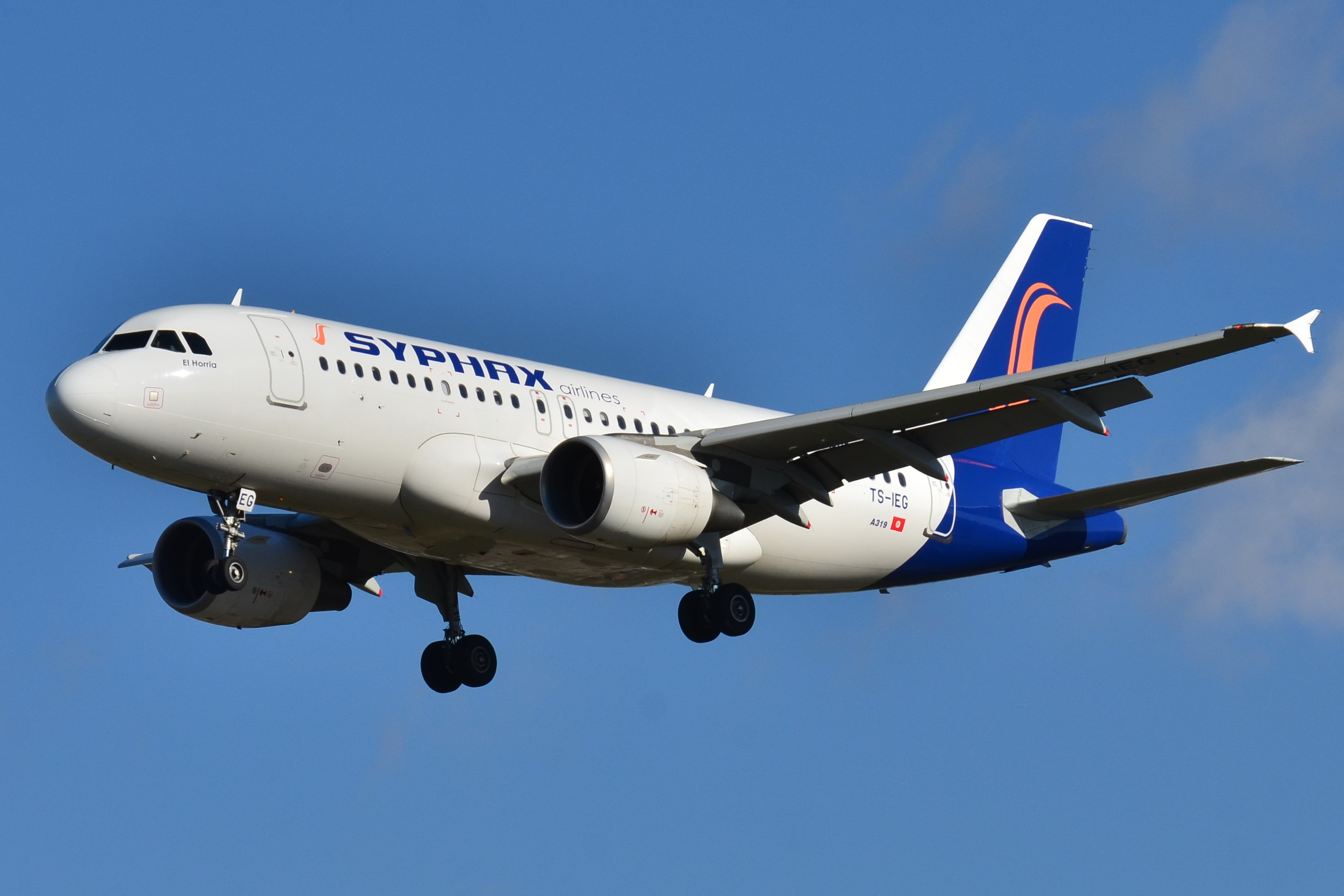
Syphax Airlines Airbus A319-100

As of October 2023, the Syphax Airlines fleet includes the following aircraft:

Syphax Airlines fleet
Aircraft	Total	Orders	Passengers			Notes
Aircraft	Total	Orders	C	Y	Total	Notes
Boeing 737-800	—	1	20	145	165	
Total	—	1				
