= Tunisavia =

Tunisian airline

IATA	ICAO	Call sign
TT	TAJ	TUNISAVIA
- Founded: 1974
- Hubs: Tunis-Carthage International Airport
- Fleet size: 11
- Headquarters: Tunis, Tunisia
- Website: www.tunisavia.com.tn

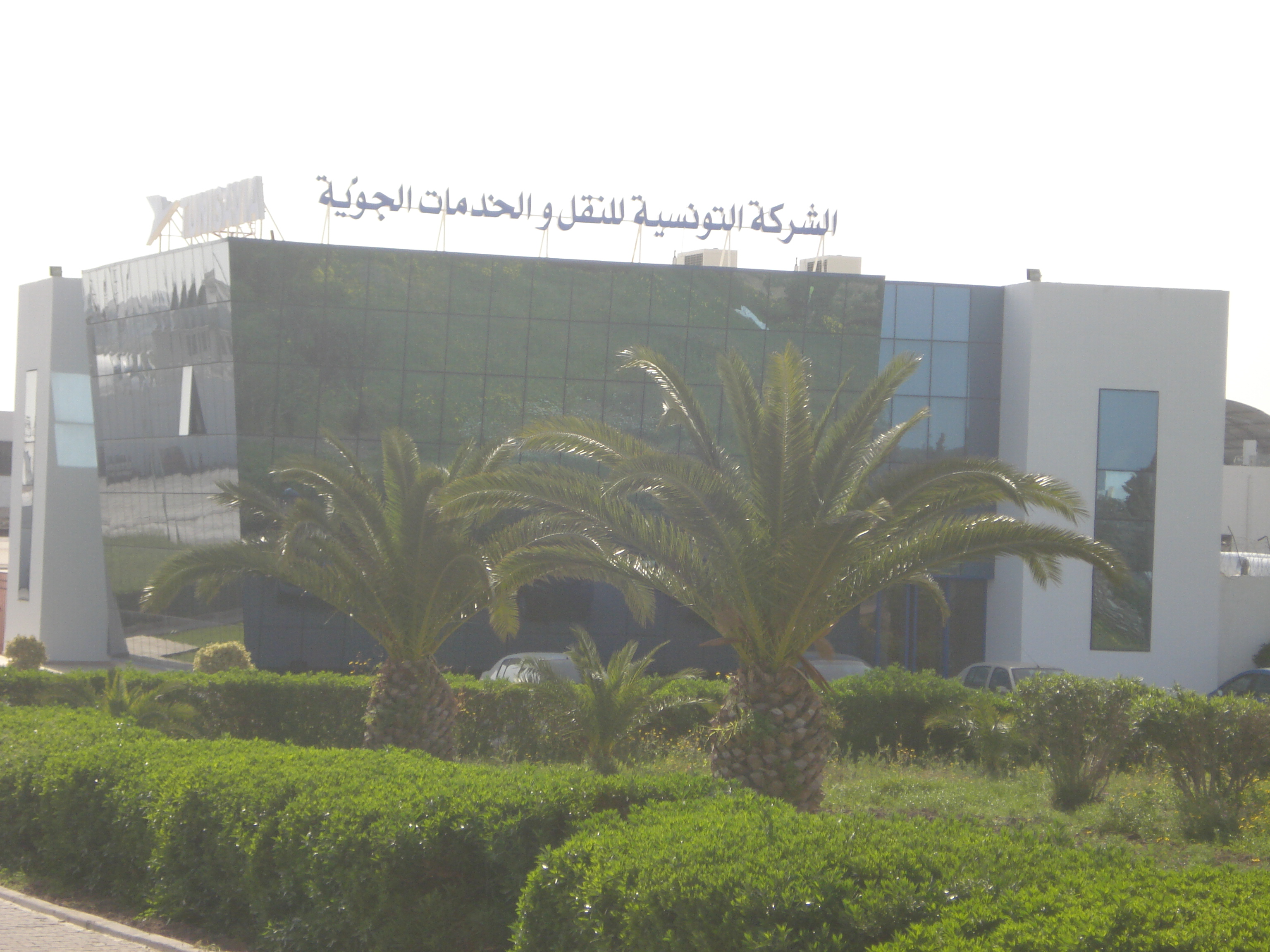
Headquarters of Tunisavia

Tunisavia is a charter airline based in Tunis, Tunisia. Its main base is Tunis-Carthage International Airport.

== History ==
Tunisavia was founded in 1974. It operates air support to oil and gas companies, medical evacuations, aerial works, business aviation, and airport handling.

== Fleet ==
=== Current fleet ===
The Tunisavia fleet includes the following aircraft (as of 17 September 2020):

Tunisavia fleet
Aircraft	Total	Orders	Passengers	Notes
de Havilland Canada DHC-6 Twin Otter	1	0	19	(as of August 2025)
Bombardier Challenger 600	2	0	between 8–10	property of the company and Nouvelair whose management was entrusted to Tunisavia
Total	4	0		

=== Helicopters ===
Tunisavia Helicopters fleet
Helicopters	Total	Orders	Passengers	Notes
Dauphin 365 N	2	0	11	
Dauphin 365 N3	5	0	11	
Total	7	0		

=== Former fleet ===
Tunisavia former fleet
Aircraft	Total	Orders	Passengers	Notes
Cessna Citation II	1	0		
Dassault Falcon 100	1	0		
Dassault Falcon 50	1	0		
de Havilland Canada DHC-6 Twin Otter	1	0		
Fokker F27 Friendship	5-6	0		3 F27's purchased from Air New Zealand, total figure operated unknown (3 Ex Air NZ airframes, ZK-NAA, ZK-NAB, ZK-NAF, and 2 confirmed Tunisian ones, TS-LVC, TS-LVB)
Total	9-10	0		
