= Indonesian Air Force =

Aerial service branch of the Indonesian National Armed Forces

- Tentara Nasional Indonesia Angkatan Udara
- Insignia of the Indonesian Air Force
- Founded: 9 April 1946; 80 years ago
- Country: Indonesia
- Type: Air force
- Role: Aerial warfare
- Size: 30,100 personnel (2023); 263 aircraft (2025)
- Part of: Indonesian National Armed Forces
- Headquarters: Cilangkap, Jakarta
- Mottos: Swa Bhuwana Paksa (Sanskrit, lit. 'Wings of the Motherland')
- Colours: Light blue
- March: Mars Swa Bhuwana Paksa
- Anniversaries: 9 April (foundation); 29 July 1947 (Air Force Service Day)
- Engagements: Indonesian National Revolution; Darul Islam rebellion; South Maluku rebellion; PRRI rebellion; Permesta rebellion; West New Guinea dispute; Indonesia-Malaysia Confrontation; Operation Trisula; Communist insurgency in Sarawak; Insurgency in Papua; Invasion of East Timor; Insurgency in East Timor; 1999 East Timorese crisis; Insurgency in Aceh; 2003 Bawean incident; Operation Madago Raya
- Website: www.tni-au.mil.id

Commanders
- Commander-in-Chief of the Armed Forces: President Prabowo Subianto
- Chief of Staff of the Air Force: Air Chief Marshal Mohamad Tony Harjono
- Deputy Chief of Staff of the Air Force: Air Marshal Tedi Rizalihadi
- Inspector General of the Air Force: Air Marshal Arif Mustofa
- Coordinator of the Air Force Advisory Staff: Air Marshal I Wayan Sulaba

Insignia
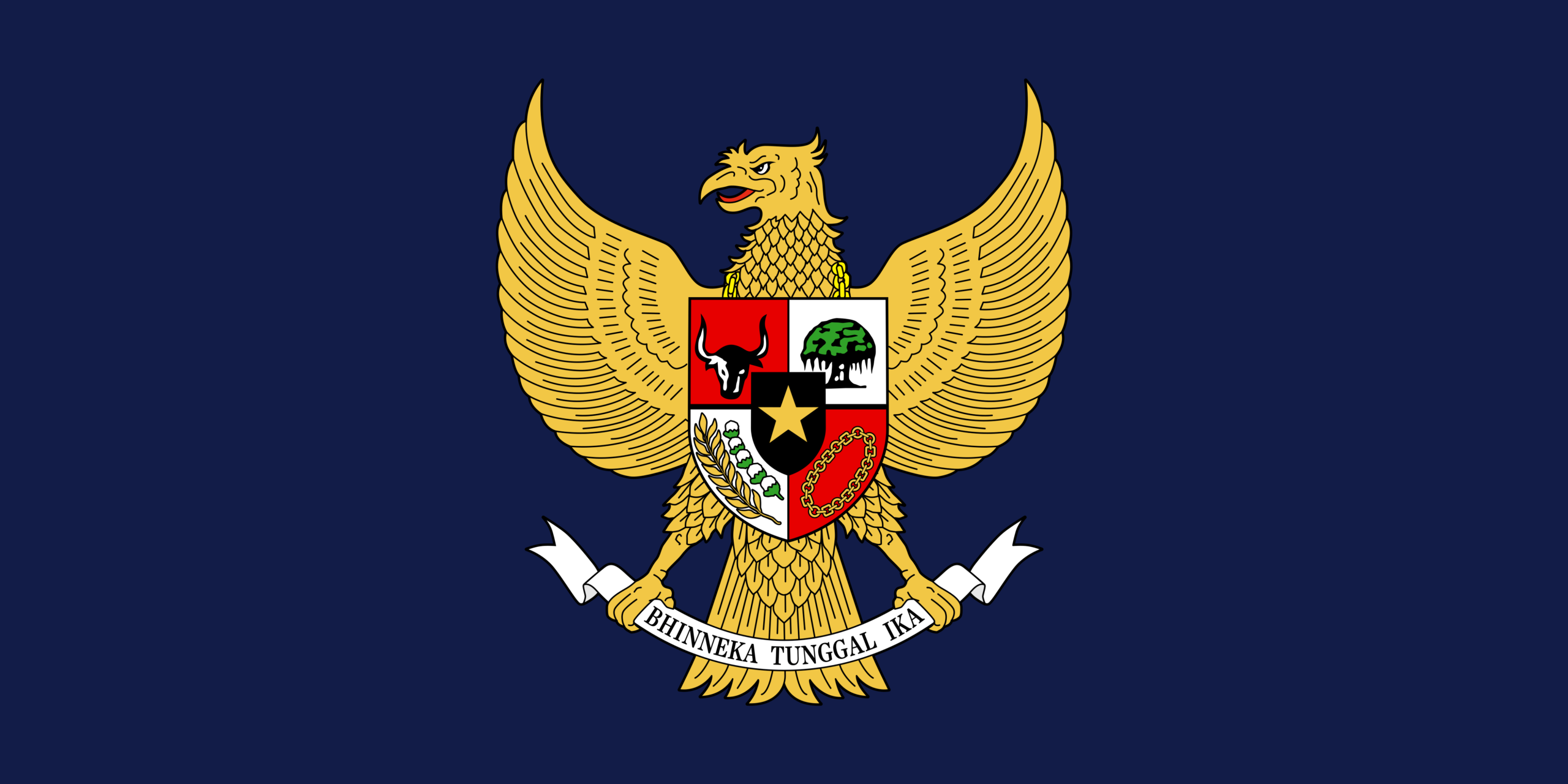
- Flag: Reverse

- Roundel

- Fin flash

- Wordmark

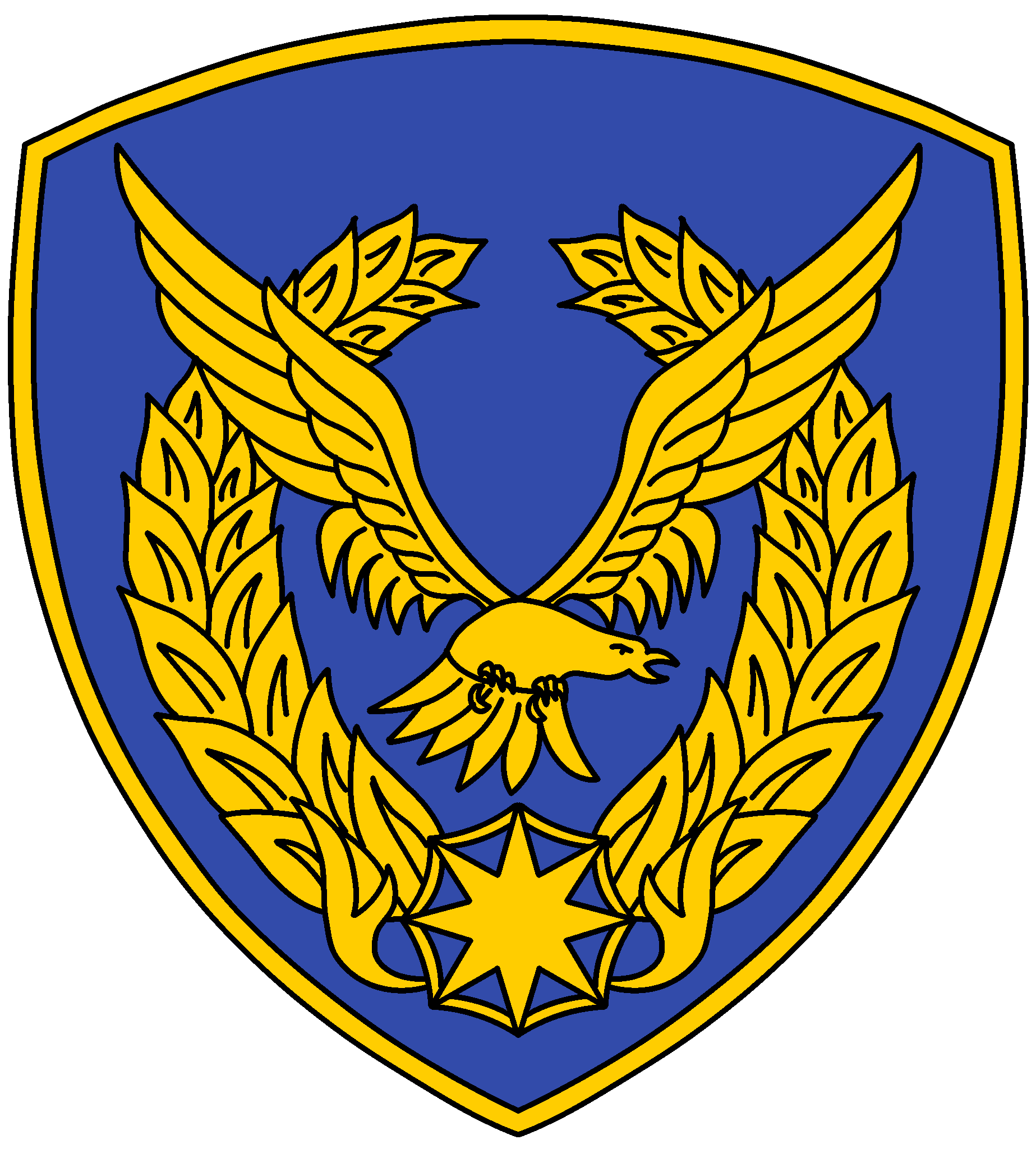
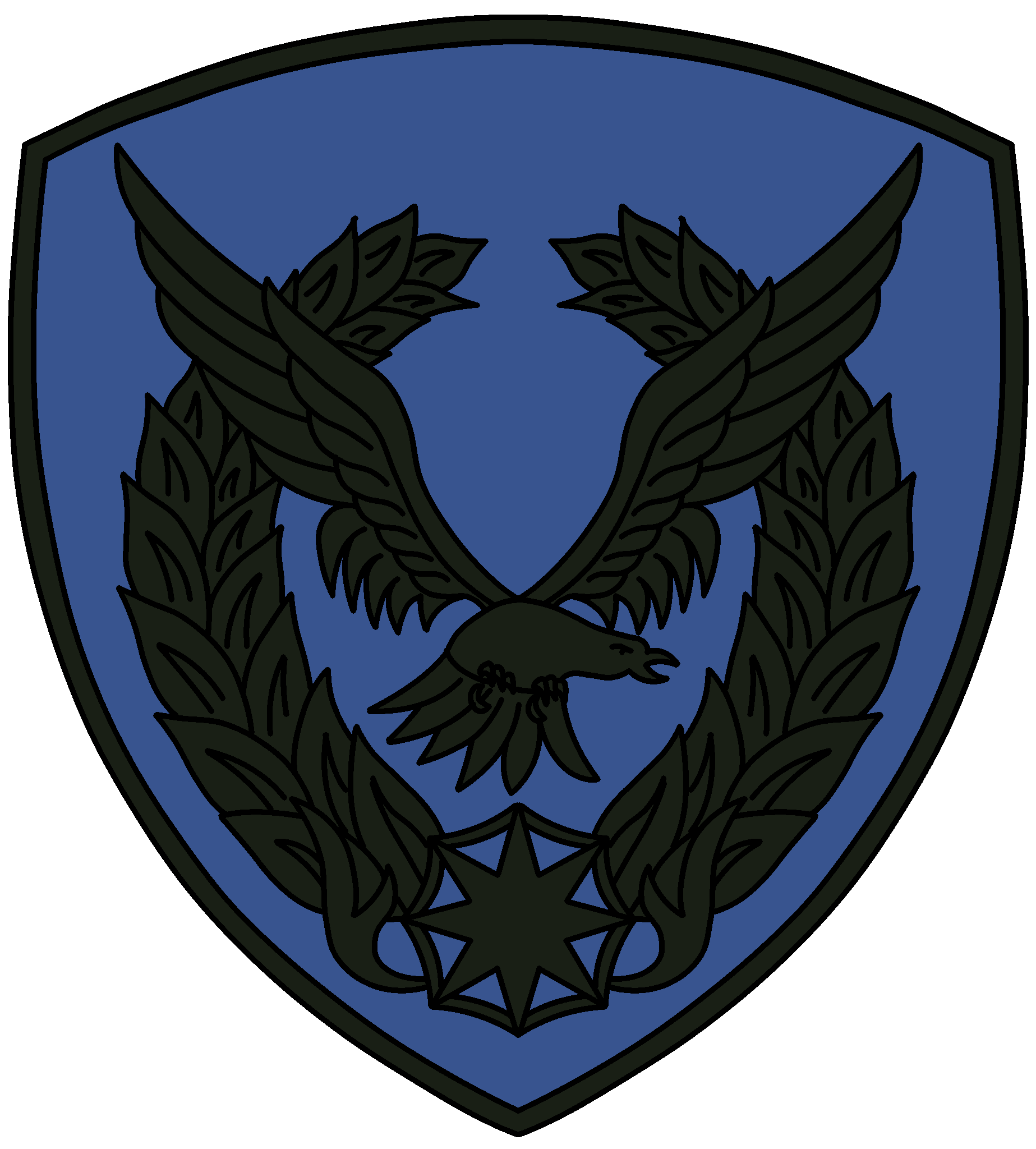
- Headquarters insignia

Aircraft flown
- Attack: Hawk 209, T-50i, EMB 314, Anka-S, CH-4B
- Fighter: Rafale F4, F-16 Block 20/25 Adv., Su-30MK/MK2, Su-27SK/SKM
- Helicopter: NAS 332, H225M, AW101, AW139, NBO 105, EC120B
- Patrol: 737-2X9 Surveiller, CN235 MPA, CN295 SM
- Reconnaissance: Anka-S, CH-4B, Aerostar TUAV, Wulung, Orbiter 2B
- Trainer: T-50i, Hawk 109, KT-1B, G 120TP, Cessna 182T, Cessna 172S SP, T-41D, UAV-D
- Transport: A400M MRTT, C-130B/H, L-100, C-130J-30, CN235, CN295, NC212, Falcon 8X, Boeing 737-200/400/500/800NG
- Tanker: A400M MRTT, KC-130B

The Indonesian Air Force (Indonesian: Tentara Nasional Indonesia Angkatan Udara, (TNI-AU), lit. 'Indonesian National Military Air Force', sometimes shortened as IDAF / IdAF) is the aerial branch of the Indonesian National Armed Forces. The Indonesian Air Force is headquartered in Jakarta, Indonesia, and is headed by the Chief of Staff of the Air Force (Kepala Staf Angkatan Udara – KSAU or KASAU). Its order of battle is split into three Air Operations Commands (Indonesian: Komando Operasi Udara). Most of its airbases are located on the island of Java. The Indonesian Air Force also has its ground force unit, called Air Force Quick Reaction Force Corps (Korpasgat). The corps is also known as the "Orange Berets" (Baret Jingga) due to the distinctive color of their service headgear.

The Indonesian Air Force has 30,100 personnel and equipped with 110 combat aircraft. The inventory includes 33 F-16 Fighting Falcons as the main fighters (from the United States) supplemented by five Su-27 and eleven Su-30MK's (from Russia), Hawk 200, KAI T-50 and Embraer EMB 314. The Indonesian Air Force also intends to purchase 50 KF-X fighter jets from South Korea. As of 2023, the Indonesian Air Force purchased 42 Rafale from France, along with C-130J transport aircraft and a Medium-altitude long-endurance unmanned aerial vehicle.

== History ==
=== War of Independence (1945–1949) ===
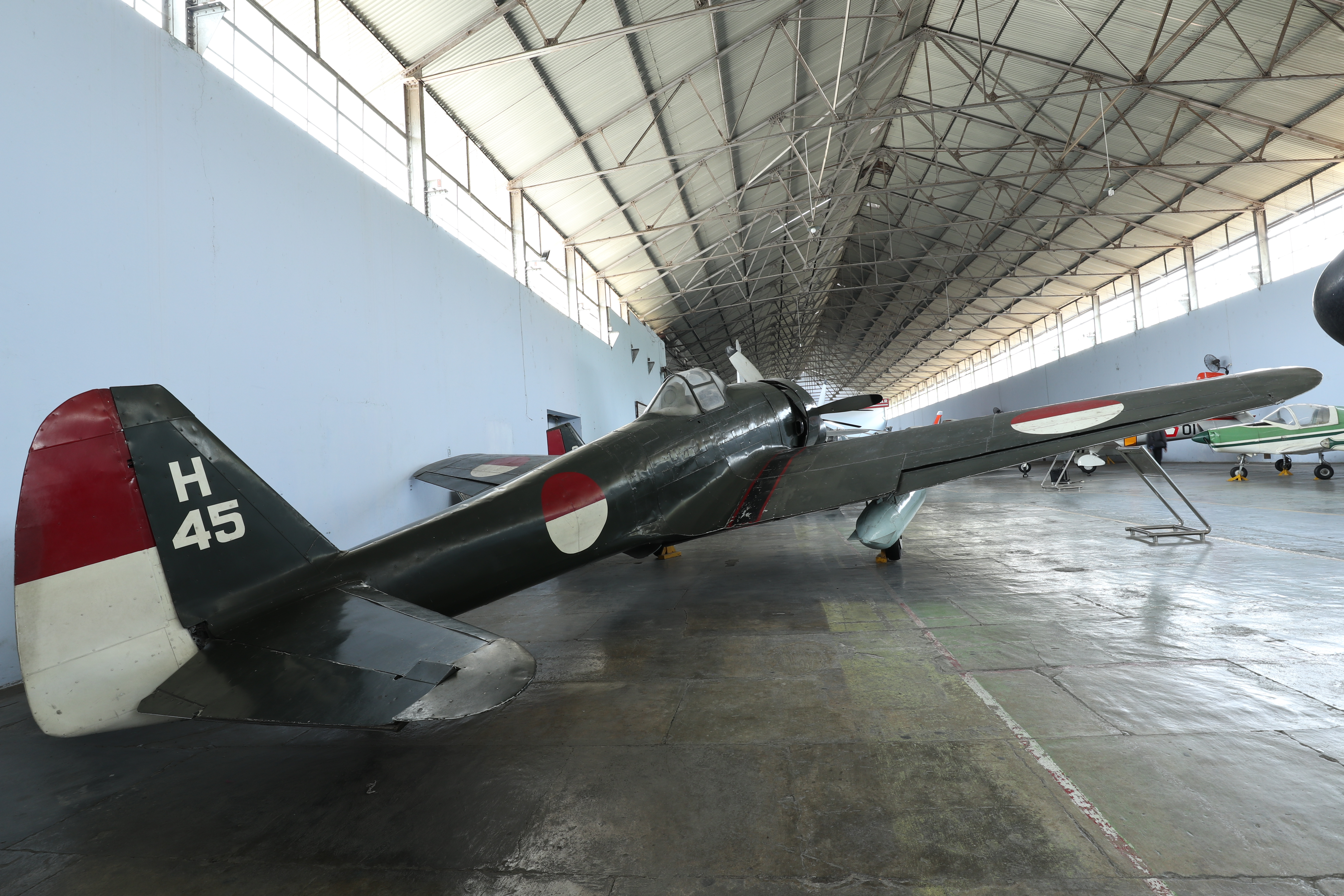
Nakajima Ki-43 "Oscar" with markings similar to those used by the Indonesians in the War of Independence. Note the early roundel and full fin flash.

Roundel history

(1946–1949)

(1950–9 April 1954)

(9 April 1954–present)

After Japan announced their surrender on 15 August 1945 at the end of World War II, Indonesian nationalist leader Sukarno declared Indonesian independence on 17 August 1945. Several days later on the 23 August, the Indonesian People's Security Agency (Badan Keamanan Rakyat) was formed to undertake security duties. The Air Component of this force, BKR Udara, (Note: contemporarily spelled as BKR Oedara) was also formed. The air arm would captured and use ex-Japanese planes scattered everywhere, especially in the island of Java. The most numerous of these aircraft were the Yokosuka K5Y1 "Willow" trainers, which was given the nickname Cureng by the Indonesians, and they were hastily used to train newly recruited cadets. The new roundel was created simply by painting white on the lower part of the Japanese Hinomaru, reflecting the red and white of the Indonesian flag.

In 1945, there was only one Indonesian holding a multi-engine pilot license from the pre-war Dutch Flying School, Flying Officer Agustinus Adisucipto. Adisucipto flew a Cureng with red and white markings from Maguwo airfield in Yogyakarta on 27 October 1945, becoming the first Indonesian pilot to fly an aircraft after the country's unilateral independence. In December 1945, a flight school was created at Maguwo airfield, commanded by Adisucipto. He was assisted by a few Japanese pilots who decided to stay in the country. The People's Security Agency was re-organized in October 1945, and again in January 1946 to form the nascent formal armed forces. This marked the birth of the Indonesian Air Force on 9 April 1946. Commodore Soerjadi Soerjadarma, a former bombardier and navigator in the Dutch colonial air force, was appointed as its first chief-of-staff.

Throughout 1946 and early 1947, the Indonesian Air Force carried out liaison duties between cities in Java and Sumatra, and its pilot cadets performed cross-country flights. Training facilities spread across various airfields for technicians, military police, radio operators, and airbase defense were also created during this time. On 23 April 1946, three Air Force Tachikawa Ki-55 Cukiu transported Indonesian delegation from Yogyakarta to Jakarta for a negotiation with the Allies on resolving the issue of Allied prisoner-of-war repatriation.

However, tensions rose as the Dutch tried to re-claim their former colony and launched an offensive on 21 July 1947, destroying most of the Indonesian Air Force planes on the ground. Some planes survived and were hidden in remote bases. On 29 July 1947, three surviving aircraft, comprising two Yokosuka K5Y1 Cureng and a Mitsubishi Ki-51 "Guntei" (the fourth aircraft, a Nakajima Ki-43 Hayabusa flown by Air Cadet Bambang Saptoadji, should also have been involved in the raid as an escort, but as of when it was launched, the aircraft was not airworthy due to engine troubles) conducted air raids before dawn on the Dutch Army positions in Semarang, Salatiga and Ambarawa, dropping incendiary bombs. It was the first combat mission of the Indonesian Air Force. Tactically, these raids did not have any effect on the Dutch positions, but psychologically, it was a great success as it proved that the Indonesian Air Force still existed. The Dutch had previously claimed the destruction of Indonesian Air Force in their assault before and did not expected any attack from the sky.

The first airborne mission took place on 17 October 1947, when a fourteen men guerillas led by Major Tjilik Riwut was airdropped by a C-47 around Kotawaringin in southern Kalimantan. Out of the original fourteen, one of them did not jump, another went missing, three were killed in firefight, and the other were captured by Dutch forces, the last of them were captured on 7 December. Although it was an unsuccessful mission, the 17 October was celebrated as the founding day of Korpasgat, the Air Force's infantry and special forces corps.

=== Sukarno era (1950–1967) ===
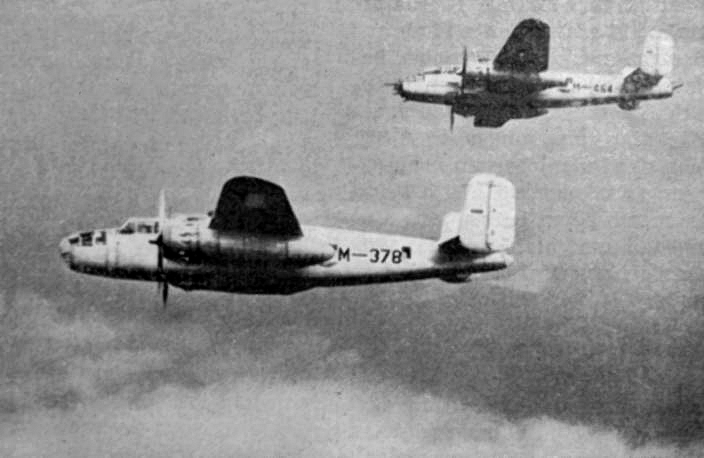
B-25 Mitchell bombers of the AURI in the 1950s

Under pressure from the United Nations, the Dutch finally agreed to acknowledge Indonesian independence. Following the 1949 Round Table Conference, sovereignty was officially transferred to the United States of Indonesia. The Dutch armed forces left (but remained in West Papua until 1963), and the aeroplanes were handed over to the Indonesians. These comprised, among others, North American P-51 Mustang, North American B-25 Mitchell, North American T-6 Texan, Douglas A-26 Invader, Douglas C-47 Dakota and Consolidated PBY-5A Catalina, which served as the main forces of the Indonesian Air Force for the following decade. During this era, Indonesia received its first jet aircraft; De Havilland DH-115 Vampire. It was also during this era that the national roundels were changed to the red and white pentagon (which was supposed to signify Indonesia's national ideology of "Panca Sila", or the "Five Principles", created by Sukarno in 1945).

Political instability meant that the Indonesian Air Force saw action against several regional rebellions in Indonesia such as PRRI, Permesta, Darul Islam-Tentara Islam Indonesia (DI/TII) and the Republic of South Maluku separatists.

Several Indonesian pilots scored their first kills, including Captain Ignatius Dewanto with his North American P-51 Mustang, who in 1958 shot down a Permesta Douglas B-26 Invader over Ambon. Its pilot, Allen Pope, an American CIA agent, was captured and tried in Jakarta, thus revealing the significant involvement of the CIA's "Operation Haik" in the rebellion.

The most famous Indonesian fighter pilot in this era was Rusmin Nurjadin, who became Chief of Staff of the Air Force from 1966 to 1969. Nurjadin commanded MiG-21 squadrons in 1962–65 and founded an acrobatic team in 1962 that flew the MiG-17F/PF Fresco over some cities in Indonesia. Small numbers of Indonesian Air Force pilots gained their reputation as aces in this era.

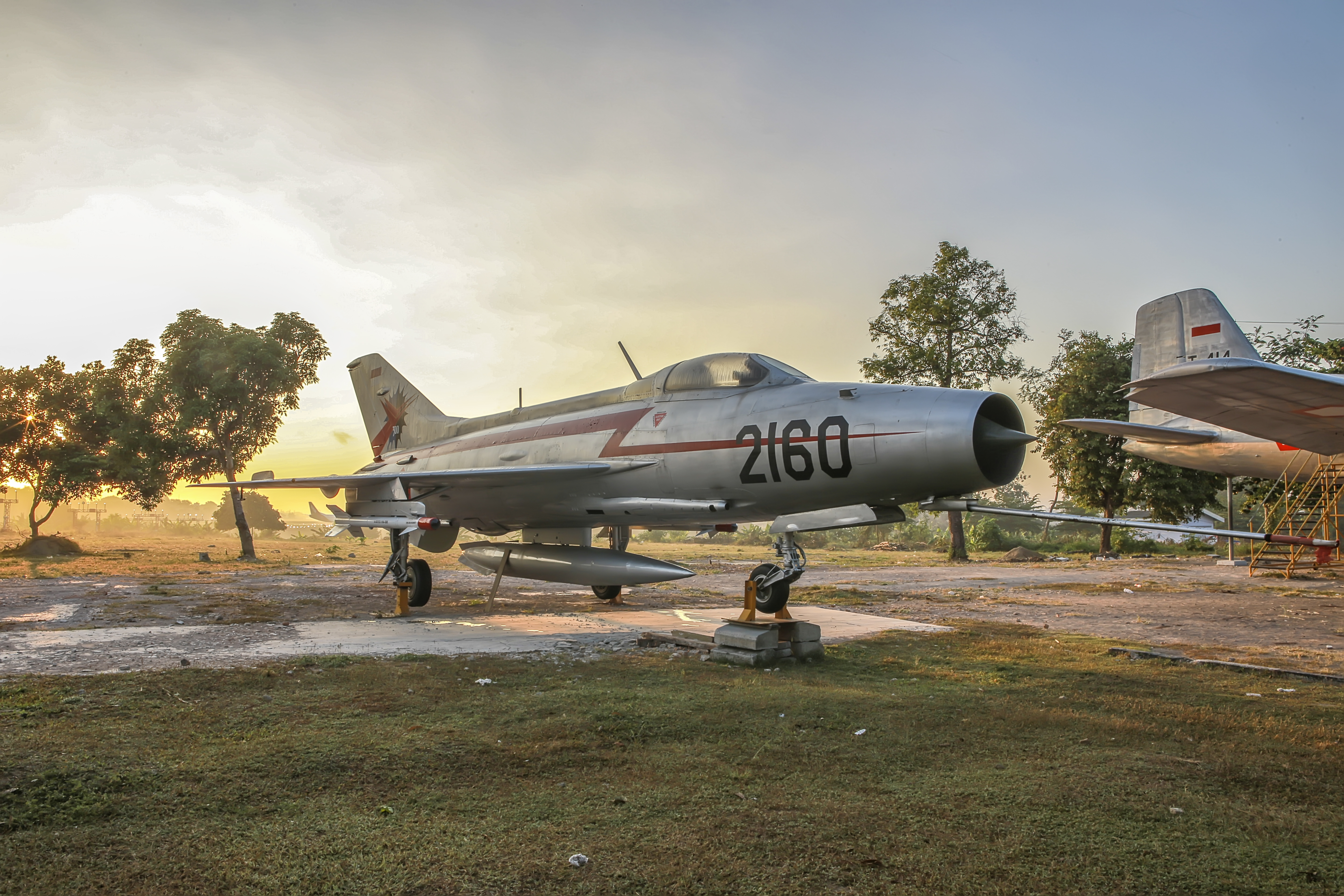
Indonesian Air Force MiG-21 in the Yogyakarta Air Force Museum

The need to prop up to what became Operation Trikora in Netherlands New Guinea and the rise of the Communist Party of Indonesia drew Indonesia closer to the Eastern Bloc. Several Soviet-built aircraft began to arrive in the early 1960s including the MiG-15UTI from Czechoslovakia, MiG-17F/PF, MiG-19S and MiG-21F-13, in addition to Ilyushin Il-28, Mil Mi-4, Mil Mi-6, Antonov An-12 and Avia 14 also from Czechoslovakia. Indonesia also received Lavochkin La-11, as well as Tupolev Tu-2 from China, intended to replace the B-25, but they never reached operational status. These aircraft served along with the remaining American aircraft such as North American B-25 Mitchell, Douglas A-26 Invader, Douglas C-47 Dakota and North American P-51 Mustang. It was during this period that the Indonesian Air Force became the first Air Force in Southeast Asia which acquired the capability of strategic bombing by acquiring the new Tupolev Tu-16 in 1961, before the acquisition of Ilyushin Il-28 by Vietnam People's Air Force. Around 25 Tu-16KS were delivered complete with AS-1 air-surface missiles. One crashed at the end of 1962. To add with all these purchases was the first ever surface to air defence missile operated by Southeast Asians, the Soviet-designed S-75 Dvina, which were acquired in 1961.

This era also marked the last confrontation with the Dutch in Papua, before the Dutch, again under pressure of the United Nations, left in 1963. Several missions of Taiwan-based Lockheed U-2s from 35th Squadron flew over Maluku (Moluccas) and reported to Dutch military that there was a strong possibility that the Dutch would lose their air superiority over Papua if they continued the war. During Operation Trikora, the air force was deployed as follows:

- 7 P-51Ds based at Laha airbase, Ambon. One aircraft piloted by Second Lieutenant (AF) Prasetyo lost due to engine failure during the ferry flight from Makassar to Ambon. Prasetyo died after bailing out from the aircraft, landing in high-tide seas and could not be rescued by the Air Force's PBY-5 Catalina due to the extreme weather after his accident.
- 40 MiG-17F/PF aircraft on three airfields: Morotai (in northern Maluku), Amahai (in Seram) and Letfuan (in Kai Islands, located in the southwest of Papua). The aircraft had been stationed at Morotai before Operation Trikora for actions against PRRI-Permesta and the Republic of South Maluku separatists. The primary role of these aircraft were to provide air cover for the airlift and logistics aircraft during the early infiltration to Papua. If the war broke out, these MiG-17F/PF would provide the air cover for Tu-16 anti-shipping missions and Il-28 bombing missions, also for intercepting Dutch Hawker Hunters based in Numfor, Biak.

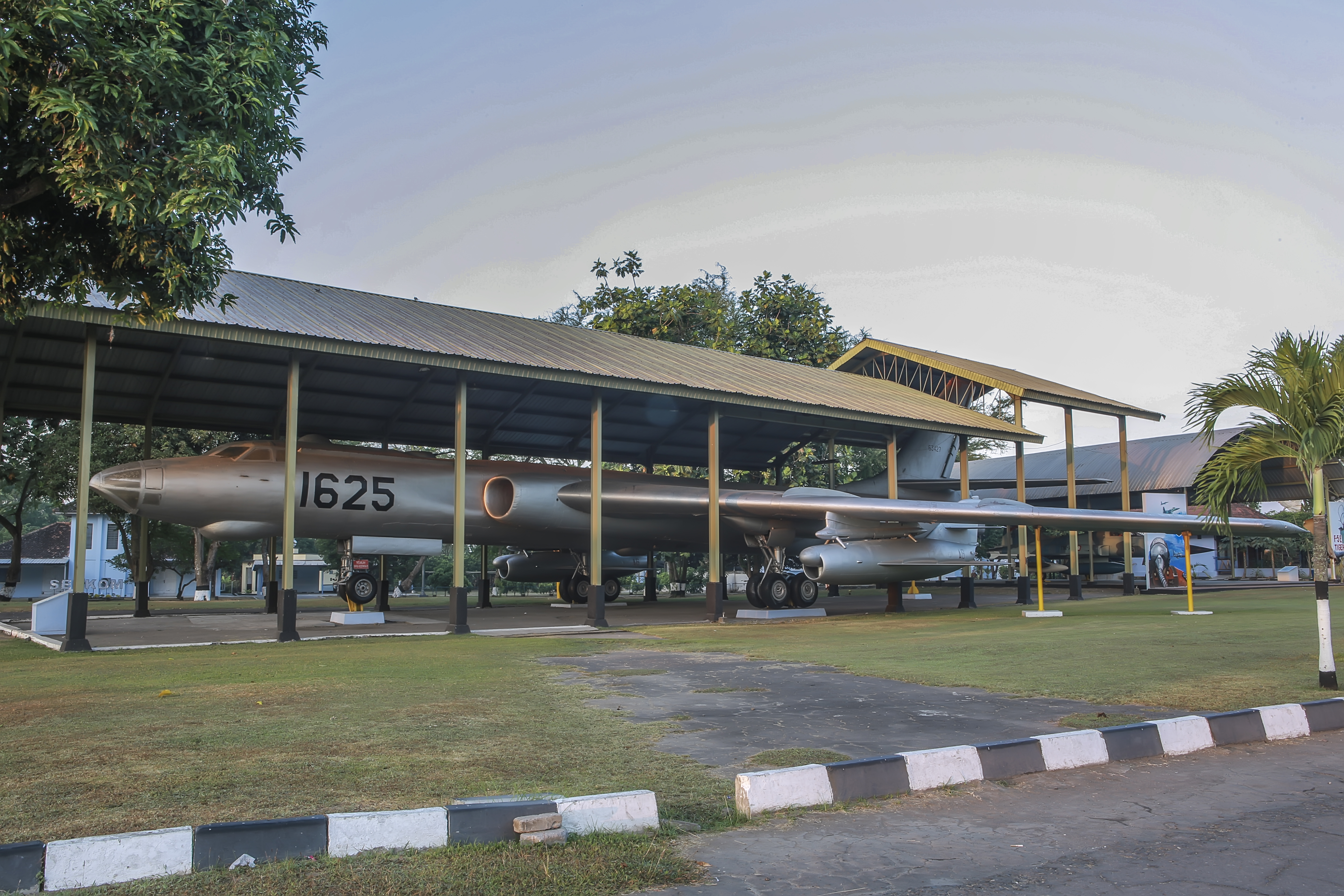
Indonesian Air Force Tu-16KS Strategic Bomber in Dirgantara Mandala Museum

- 4 B-25 Mitchells and two A-26 Invaders at Letfuan airbase. Their primary role was for transport and providing air cover for the airlift, until this role was assumed by the P-51Ds and MiG-17F/PFs. Dutch Lockheed P2V Neptunes were known as the strongest rival for these Letfuan-based units.
- 18 Il-28s stationed first at Laha airbase, but then moved to Amahai airbase, due to the shortness of runway at Laha for the landing of the aircraft.
- 26 Tu-16s stationed in Iswahyudi Air Force Base near Ngawi, East Java in 41st and 42nd Squadron. Six aircraft were scrambled to Morotai airbase for the operation. These units were to threaten the Dutch naval fleet in Papua including HNLMS Karel Doorman (R81), the only aircraft carrier of the Dutch naval fleet.
- 24 Douglas C-47 Dakotas stationed at three airfields; Laha, Amahai and Letfuan. During an operation at Papua, one aircraft piloted by Captain (AF) Djalaludin Tantu and co-pilot Second Lieutenant (AF) Sukandar, was downed by a Dutch P2V. All crews bailed out safely from the aircraft, but were then captured by the Dutch forces.
- 10 Lockheed C-130 Hercules stationed at Halim Perdanakusuma airbase at Jakarta. Despite the warning from United States to not use the aircraft for the operation, it soon scrambled over the Papua for the airlift mission, due to the loss of C-47s, to Dutch Hawker Hunters and P2V Neptunes. The C-130's high altitude flying capability made it less vulnerable to interception.
- 6 Douglas DC-3s and one Convair 240, under Wing Garuda 011. The aircraft were modified from civilian use for airlift operations.
- 6 anti-submarine Fairey Gannet AS.4s, several PBY-5 Catalinas and two Grumman HU-16 Albatross (UF-1 variant). These aircraft belonged to the Indonesian Naval Aviation, but supporting the air forces for the Operation. Aircraft were stationed in Liang airbase at Seram, then moved to Morotai airbase. One Gannet AS.4 was lost due to an accident when it crashed into a mountain in Seram island, killing three crew members.
- Several Bell 47s, Mil Mi-4 and Mil Mi-6 helicopters were planned to be used for the operation, but were not ready during the early phase of infiltration of the operation.

Indonesian MiG pilots received training to fly their fighter aircraft in Egypt before the infiltration campaign. During the infiltration of the airlift campaign, the air forces' special forces, Pasukan Gerak Tjepat (PGT) (now known as Korpasgat) landed in Klamono-Sorong, Papua.

Also during this period, the Indonesian Air Force also took part in the confrontation against Malaysia (which was backed by the United Kingdom) along the border of Kalimantan, the Malacca Strait and near the Singapore maritime border, wherein Air Force aircraft faced their counterparts in the Royal Air Force and the young Royal Malaysian Air Force.

=== New Order era (1967–1998) ===
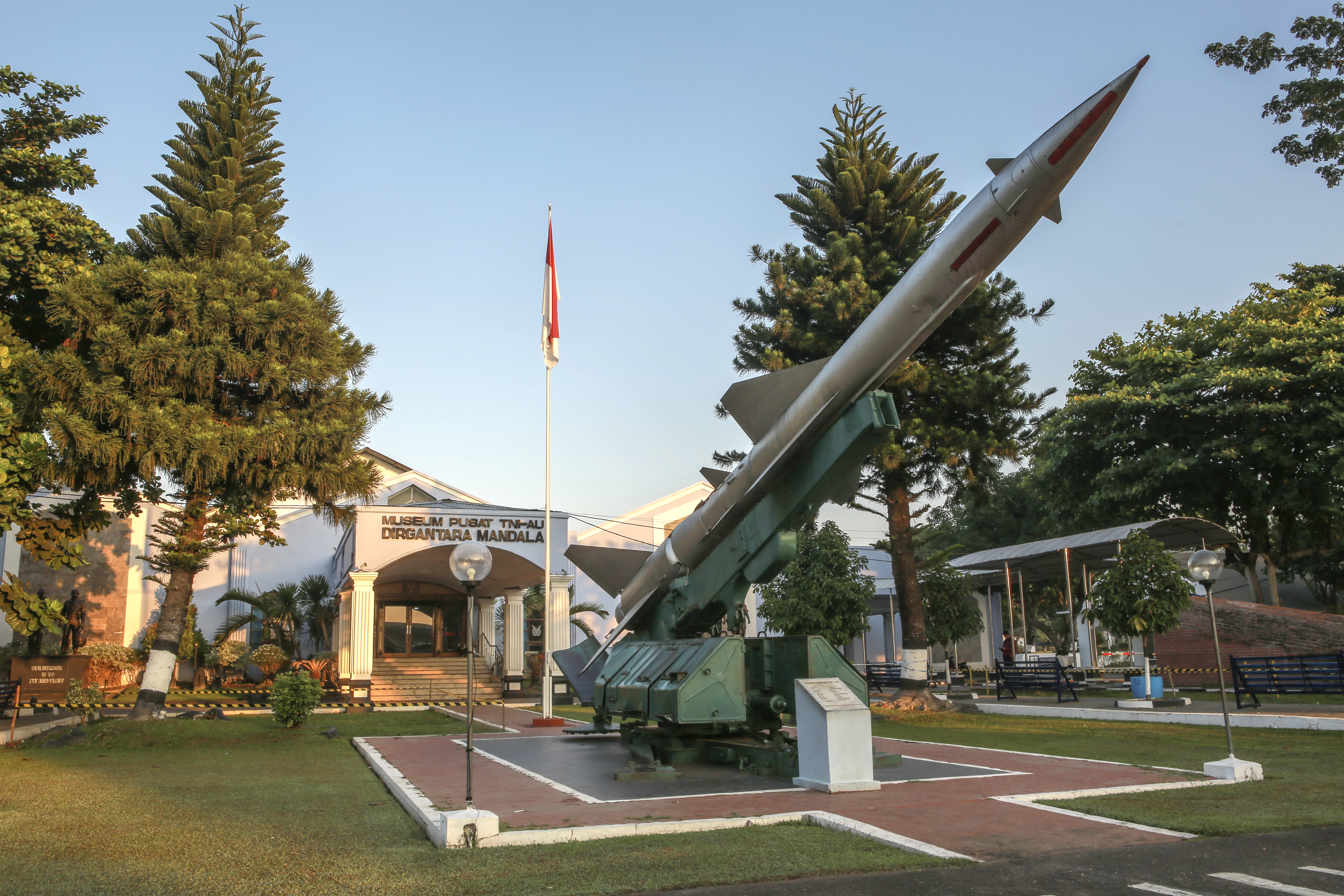
Indonesian S-75 Dvina (SA-2) Surface-to-air missile system

The coup attempt led by the 30 September Movement in 1965 changed everything and a new anti-communist regime from the Army, led by Major General Suharto, took power. The Chief of Staff of the Air Force, Air Marshall Omar Dani was removed from his position and court-martialed for his purported involvement in the coup. Ties with the Eastern bloc countries were cut, and thus support and spare parts for the planes became short. Unlike other branches of the Indonesian Armed Forces, the Air Force was broadly not implicated in the Indonesian mass killings of 1965–1966, due to the purported leftist sympathies of its members. By August 1968 the situation was critical, and in early 1970, the Chief of Staff of the Air Force, Suwoto Sukandar, said that the spare parts situation meant that only 15–20 percent of aircraft were airworthy. The MiG force made its farewell flight with a flypast of Jakarta in 1970. Several of the relatively new MiG-19s were sold to Pakistan. By October 1970, only one Tu-16 was still flying, but after an in-flight engine failure, it too was grounded. But despite the problems, the Air Force still served with distinction in fighting militant remnants of the CPI in Java's provinces, particularly in Central and East Java.

With Suharto's assumption of the presidency and the office of Commander in Chief in 1967, the focus shifted to fighting the communist PGRS/Paraku insurgency. The Air Force launched Operation Lightning Strike (Indonesian: Operasi Samber Kilat) to support ground troops eradicate Sarawak communists that were present in West Kalimantan and along Indonesia-Malaysia border by dropping troops to the target area, dropping logistical assistance, VIP transportation, medical evacuation and recon flights. The Air Force deployed Air Squadron 6 and 7 which were equipped with Mi-4, Bell 204B and UH-34D helicopters to the operation.

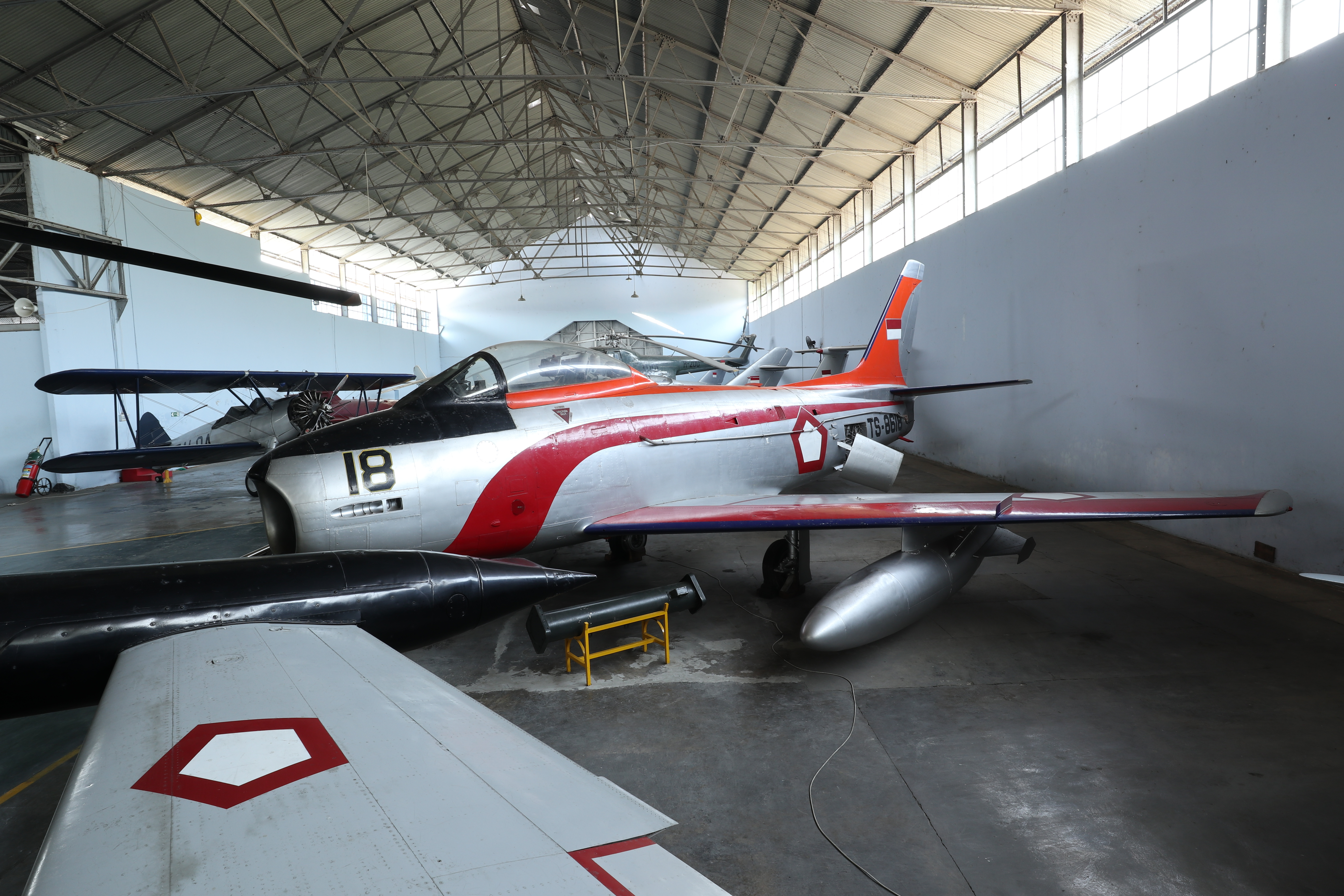
An Australian-built CAC Sabre Mk.32, as used by the Indonesian Air Force.

The Air Force began to be re-equipped by receiving former Royal Australian Air Force (RAAF) CAC Sabres – an Australian re-design of the F-86 Sabre – to replace the MiG-21s. The Sabre was used by the TNI-AU until 1982. In 1973, the United States supplied military assistance including T-33 trainers and UH-34D helicopters in exchange for four old MiG-21F-13s. Pakistan Air Force took over the responsibility to train Indonesian pilots in the Sabre and in logistical aspects of the Air Force. Over the next three years, the US supplied 16 North American Rockwell OV-10 Broncos counter-insurgency aircraft and F-5E/F Tiger II fighters, in exchange for which the Indonesian Air Force handed over the majority of its remaining MiG-21F-13s, which were used to form a US Air Force Aggressor squadron. Indonesia also purchased BAE Hawk Mk 53s from the United Kingdom in the 1970s.

The Indonesian Air Force took part in the 1975 Indonesian invasion of East Timor.

=== Reform era (1998–present) ===
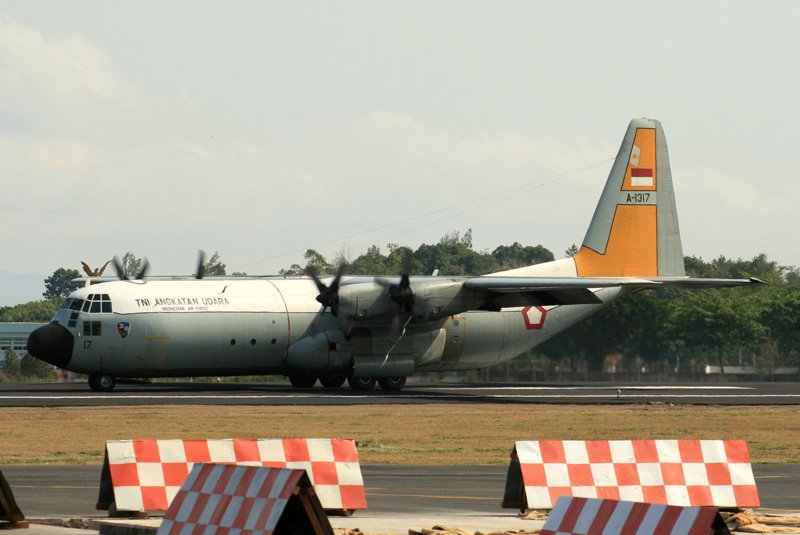
An Indonesian Air Force Lockheed C-130H-30 at Adisucipto International Airport

In 1999, the Indonesian military staged a military intervention in East Timor following an independence referendum. The result was that more than 1,500 civilians were killed and 70 percent of Dili's infrastructure razed. As the Indonesian military withdraws from East Timor, the Air Force sent a flight of BAE Hawk 109/209s to the El Tari Airport in Kupang, West Timor to cover the withdrawal. On two occasions in September 1999, the Hawks were sent to intercept Australian military aircraft that were intruding Indonesian airspace.

In response to the crisis, the United States and the European Union both imposed arms embargoes. Although the European Union chose not to renew its ban in 2000, the United States did not lift its embargo until November 2005. During this embargo, the Indonesian government turned to Russia to supply them with arms including fighters, helicopters, missiles, radars and other equipment.

In 2002, the Indonesian Air Force conducted operations against separatists, such as the Free Aceh Movement (Gerakan Aceh Merdeka (GAM)) and Free Papua Movement (Organisasi Papua Merdeka (OPM)). In the conflict with GAM in Aceh, the Indonesian Air Force utilised OV-10Fs for counter-insurgency actions along with BAe Hawk 53 and 209.

The 51st Air Squadron, which at the time operated the Aeronautics Defense Aerostar unmanned aerial vehicles, provided aerial reconnaissance for the manhunt of Santoso (alias Abu Wardah) and several other members of the East Indonesia Mujahideen in the highlands of Poso Regency, Central Sulawesi during the Operation Tinombala in July 2016.

On 27 September 2024, Indonesian Air Force is planning to establish a Space Unit to secure national airspace, though it will take time due to high costs and complex preparations. The Air Force is focused on regulatory, organizational, and resource preparation, recognizing the strategic importance of space in national defense. The National Air Operation Command Space Unit (Satuan Antariksa Koopsudnas) was established on 29 January 2026.

== Procurement and modernization programs ==
=== 1980s–1990s ===
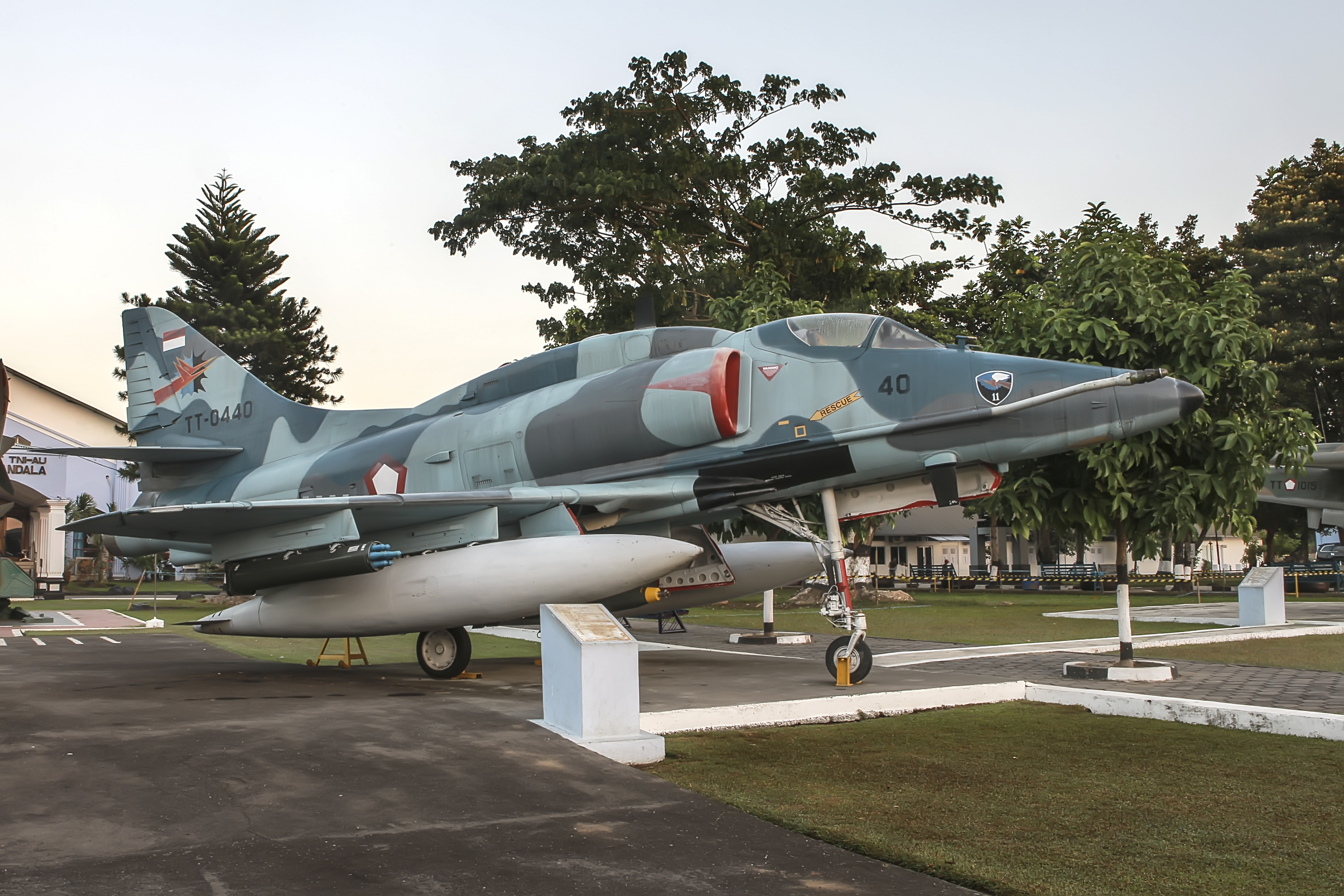
A-4E Skyhawk of the Indonesian Air Force

In the early 1980s, the Air Force, needing modern strike aircraft, organised Operation Alpha to clandestinely acquire ex-Israeli Air Force A-4 Skyhawks. Air Force personnel were sent in secret by different routes and eventually Indonesia received 32 aircraft.

In 1982, Indonesia purchased 16 Northrop F-5E/F Tiger II from the United States to replace their Sabres under the Peace Komodo I and II. These were upgraded in Belgium from 1995.

During 1986–88, there was a competition for the contract to provide a new fighter bomber, between the General Dynamics F-16 and Dassault Mirage 2000. Indonesia eventually ordered 12 F-16A/B Fighting Falcon Block 15 OCU as a new fighter in 1989. The Indonesian Air Force had originally planned to acquire 60 F-16s to cover and defend its 12 million square kilometres of territory. A total of 10 F-16A and F-16B are still in service with Indonesian Air Force: 2 planes crashed in two different accidents. A follow-up order for 9 more F-16A Block-15 OCU was cancelled in favour of 24 Su-30KI, but this order was also cancelled due to the 1997 Asian financial crisis. This requirement reflected the scale of Indonesia’s archipelagic territory, as its sovereignty under the United Nations Convention on the Law of the Sea extends to the airspace above its archipelagic waters and territorial sea.

The Indonesian Air Force ordered eight BAE Hawk Mk 109s and 32 Mk 209s in 1993. The last of these was delivered by January 1997.

=== 2000s ===
In 2002, Indonesian F-16s underwent Falcon UP program in the Netherlands with Koolhaas Alphen bv, and Daedalus Aviation Group. In that same year, the Air Force received two Sukhoi Su-27s and two Sukhoi Su-30s from Russia. The fighters were partly paid for in Indonesian palm oil. The purchase, however, did not include any weaponry. Seven South Korean KT-1B basic trainers were also purchased.

By 2005 the Air Force was experiencing a logistical crisis. The A-4s were phased out of service in 2004, and to respond to the decreasing quantity of aircraft in service, in 2006, the Indonesian Air Force ordered three Sukhoi Su-27SKM and three Su-30MK2 to complete a full squadron. It was also made public that the four aircraft procured in 2003 were inactive and awaiting an upgrade of their communication systems, as they were incompatible with the Indonesian systems in use. The additional aircraft were ordered with systems complying with the Indonesian and international standards and would also include new weaponry for all variants. A further 12 KT-1b trainers were also ordered in 2006.

Until 2008, the Indonesian Air Force had only purchased four types of missiles: KS-1 Komet, Vympel K-13, AIM-9 Sidewinder and AGM-65 Maverick. Starting from 2008, it started receiving more advanced Russian made Vympel R-73 and R-77 air-to-air missiles for its new Su-27 and Su-30 fighters. Also, a limited number of Kh-29, Kh-31 and Kh-59 air-to-ground missiles were delivered for the Su-30s.

Local weapons are being developed such as P-100 air-to-ground bomb manufactured by PT Dahana and PT Sari Bahari Malang, East Java. P-100 has been successfully tested in Su-27 and Su-30 for ground attack missions. Large-scale production has received certification from Ministry of Defence.

=== Minimum Essential Force (2010–2024) ===
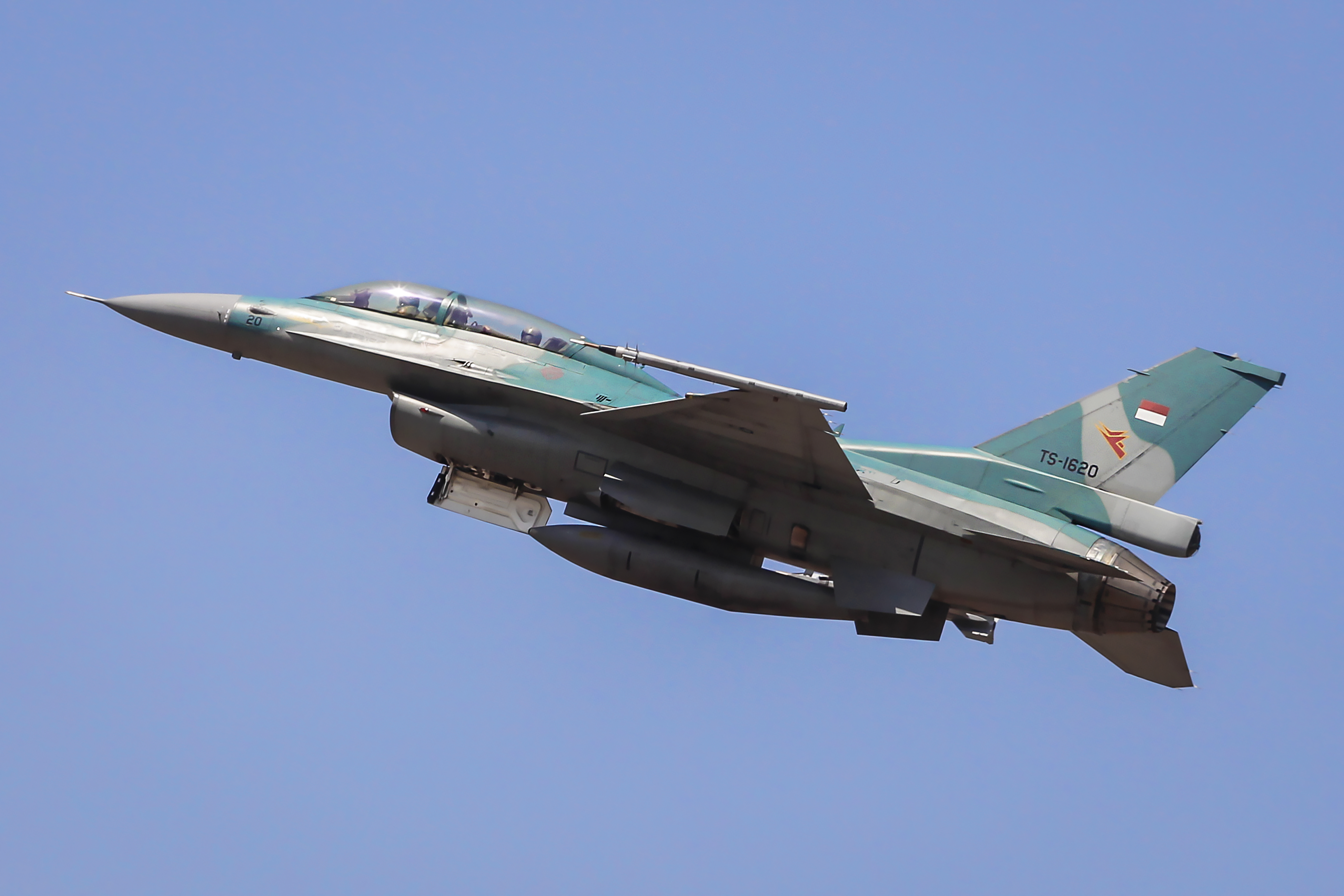
Indonesian Air Force F-16D

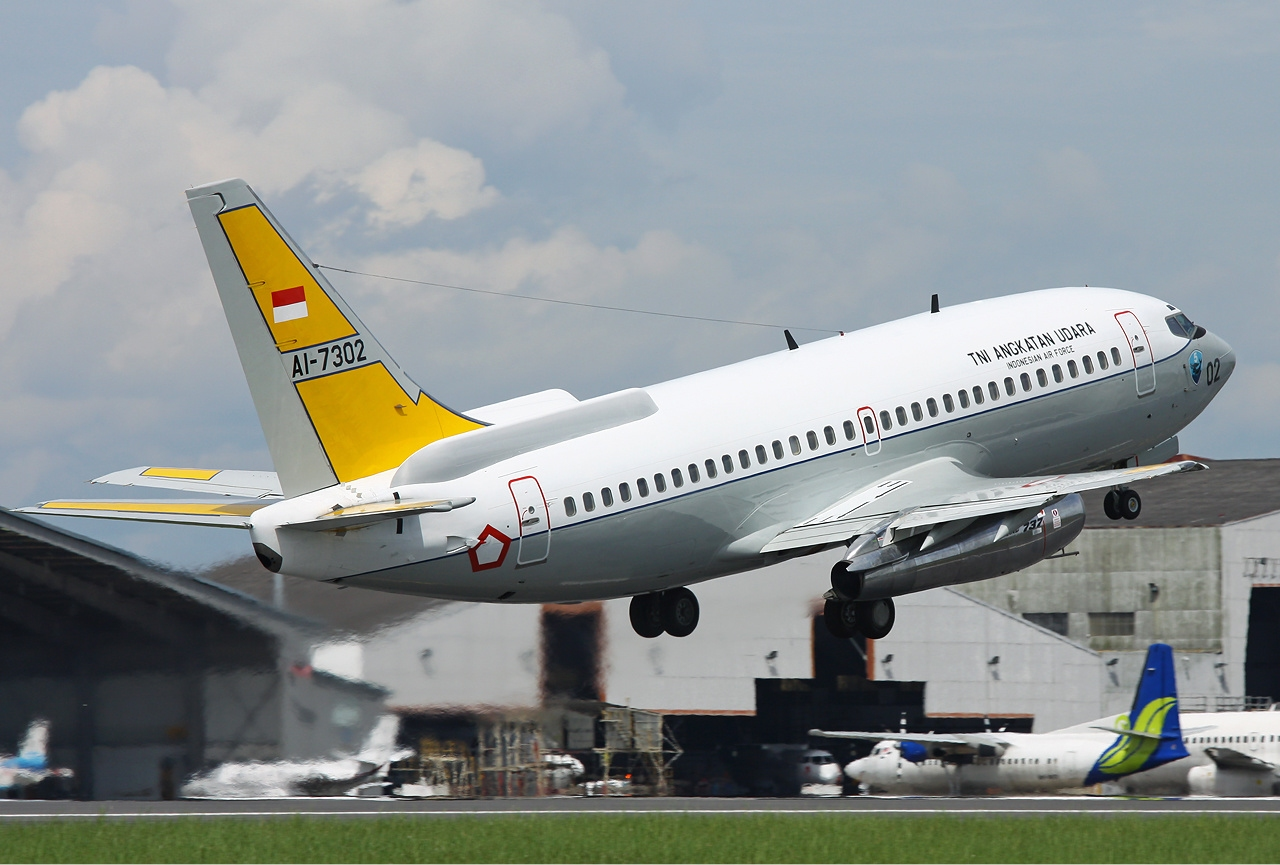
TNI-AU Boeing 737-2X9 in 2011

During the visit of US President Barack Obama on 9–10 November 2010, the TNI-AU was offered 24 ex-USAF F-16 Block 25 aircraft as part of the Peace Bima-Sena II agreement. In October 2011, the House of Representatives approved the grant. The jets would be upgraded similar to the then latest Block 50/52 variant. The TNI-AU is also progressing with the reactivation of all 10 units of F-16 Block 15 OCU, which resulted in the reactivation of TS-1606, TS-1609 and TS-1612 recently. To replace the Fokker F-27s, the TNI-AU ordered nine Spanish CASA C-295 in joint production with PT. Dirgantara Indonesia. New unmanned aerial vehicles were also purchased to strengthen TNI-AU aerial observation and were based at Supadio Air Force Base, Pontianak, Kalimantan Barat.

Starting in 2010, Minister of Defence Purnomo Yusgiantoro stated that TNI-AU will gradually purchase a total of 180 Su-27s and Su-30s to complete the needs of 10 squadrons. India also offered TNI-AU Indian-Russian made BrahMos missiles to equip its Su-27s and Su-30s.

Indonesia signed a memorandum of understanding to participate in the South Korean KF-X programme in July 2010 and the terms of agreement was signed in 2011. Indonesia agreed to finance 20 percent of the project and would receive 50 jets in return, while South Korea would get 200 jets. A Defence ministry spokesman claimed that the jet would be more capable than the F-16 but less capable than the F-35. The project was started in 2009 and the first prototype is expected to roll out in the second half of 2020. But payment problems and technical difficulties had caused several delays and postponement of the KAI KF-X project. Indonesia has also signed an MOU with China to produce C-705 anti-ship missiles which will arm the Sukhoi jets.

In April 2011, Indonesia confirmed that it will buy 16 supersonic KAI T-50 Golden Eagle trainer jets from South Korea for up to US$400 million after an evaluation of the Yakovlev Yak-130, Guizhou JL-9/FTC-2000 Mountain Eagle and Aero L-159 Alca. The T-50 would replace the BAE Hawk MK-53 trainer jets. Deliveries were completed by January 2014 and were commissioned on 13 February 2014.

In June 2011, Indonesia signed the final contract for 8 Super Tucano as the replacement for the OV-10 Bronco in the counter-insurgency role with a second contract for a further 8 aircraft in July 2012. The first four units arrived in March 2012 with deliveries complete by 2014.

In August 2011, Indonesia announced that it would acquire 18 Grob G120TP for its basic trainer requirements which would likely replace the FFA AS-202 Bravo and Beechcraft T-34 Mentor trainers.

On 29 December 2011 Indonesia committed to purchase 6 Su-30MK2 jet fighters in a US$470 million procurement contract signed by the Defence Ministry and Russia's JSC Rosoboronexport. Deliveries were set to reportedly start after 2013.

In January 2012, the Australian and Indonesian governments agreed to the transfer of four used C-130H Hercules aircraft from the Royal Australian Air Force to the Indonesian Air Force in 2012, which was approved by the US as the Hercules' producer.

In January 2014, Defence Minister Purnomo Yusgiantoro said that he hoped to start the replacement of the F-5 fighters under the upcoming 2015 to 2020 strategic plan. The Indonesian Air Force shortlisted five candidates for the replacement, comprising the Sukhoi Su-35S, Saab JAS 39 Gripen, Dassault Rafale, Eurofighter Typhoon, and F-16C/D Block 60.

In September 2014, Head of Indonesian National Armed Forces Public Relations and Media Office (Kapuspen TNI), Major General (TNI) Mochamad Fuad Basya explained the Minimum Essential Forces (MEF) Plan of TNI-AU consist of: 11 Fighter Squadrons, 6 Transport Squadrons, 2 VIP/VVIP Squadrons, 2 Patrol Squadrons, 4 Helicopter Squadrons, 2 Training Squadrons and 2 UAV Squadrons.

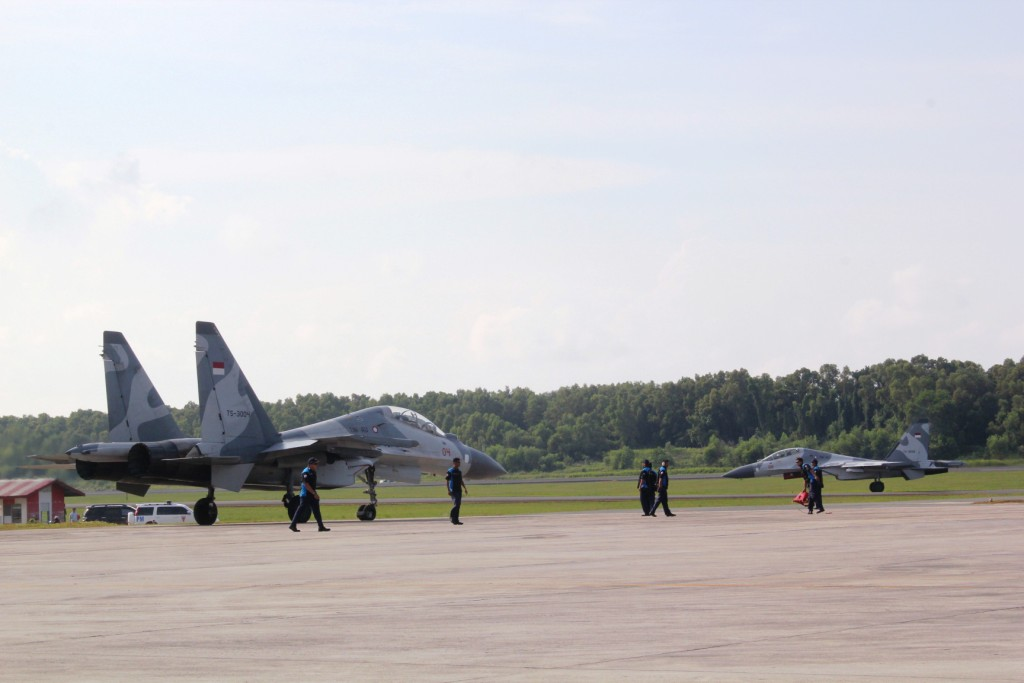
Indonesian Air Force Sukhoi Su-30MK2 at Sultan Hasanuddin International Airport

In September 2015, Defence Minister Ryamizard Ryacudu said that Indonesia had chosen the Su-35 Flanker-E to replace the F-5 Tiger II. Although in recent times, the deal to purchase Su-35 is in limbo due to Russia's refusal to give transfer of technology to Indonesia owing its small number of orders in addition to Indonesian concerns over price.

In January 2017, Indonesia approved for the acquisition of 5 Airbus A400M Atlas multi-role aircraft worth US$2 billion, as part of the plans to boost the country's military capabilities. They are to be acquired in both transport and utility configurations and will be operated by the Indonesian Air Force (TNI-AU) Aviation Squadrons 31 and 32. In November 2021, Indonesian ministry of defence officially orders two Airbus A400M in multirole tanker and transport configuration.

On 12 May 2017, Defence Minister Ryamizard Ryacudu confirmed that the Indonesian Air Force (TNI-AU) will sign contract to buy 10 Su-35s. Russia will open the factory for Sukhoi Spare Parts in Indonesia as part of the contract. On 28 November 2017, the Defence Minister confirmed that the Air Force (TNI-AU) had completed the procurement process of the aircraft.

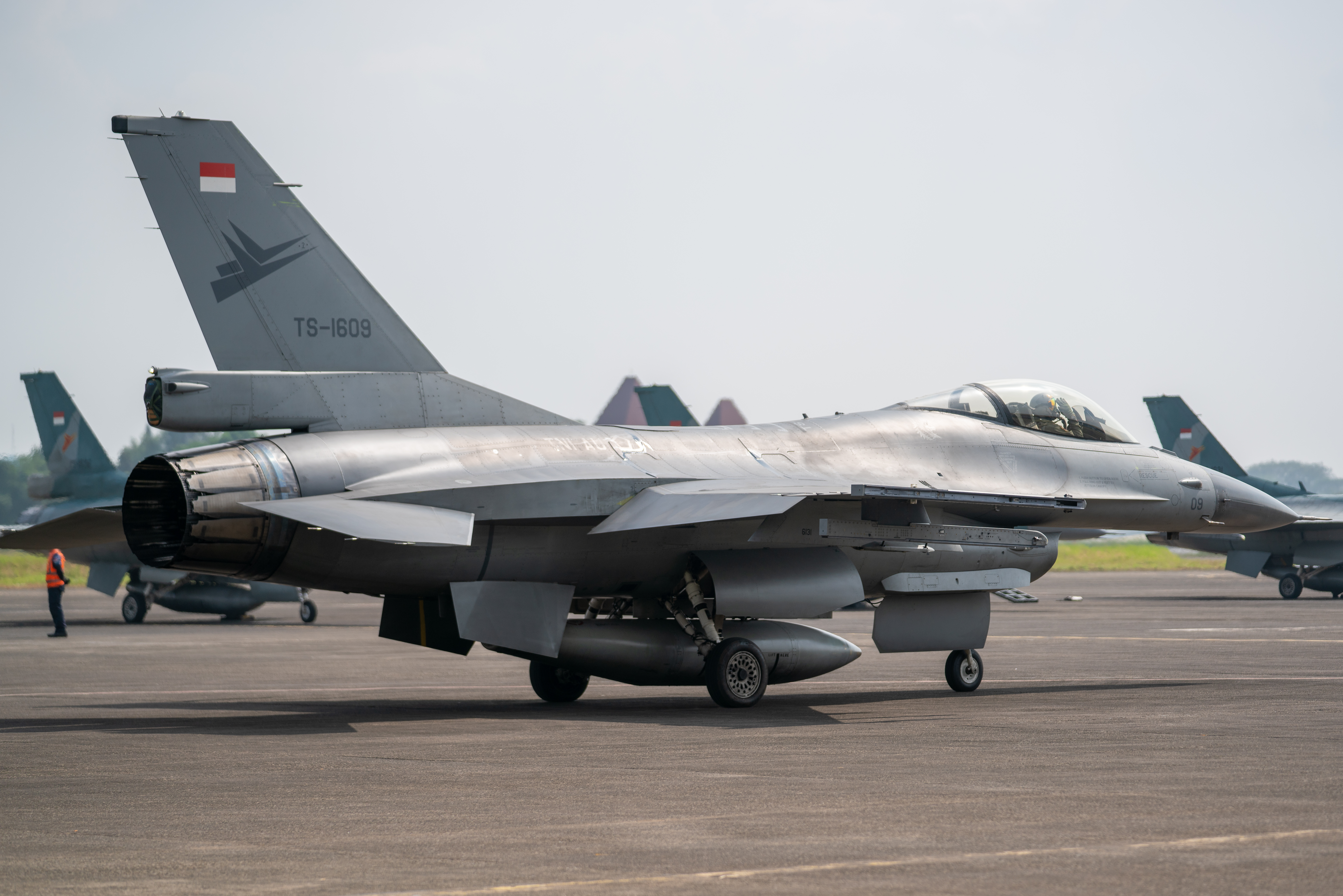
TS-1609, Indonesia Air Force F-16AM (Falcon STAR eMLU)

In October 2019 the Chief of Staff of the Indonesian Air Force Yuyu Sutisna said the Indonesian Air Force will purchase at least 2 Squadrons (32 aircraft) of F-16V Block 70/72 for the last phase of the 'Minimum Essential Force' program (MEF Fase 3 2020–2024) to replace the older BAE Systems Hawk. Since 2017 the Indonesian Air Force with Lockheed Martin and Indonesian Aerospace is also upgrading their existing F-16A/B with the Falcon STAR eMLU upgrade program that include new avionics, new armament capability that could carry AMRAAM, and JDAM, new aircraft airframe that will last longer, Sniper ATP, LITENING, and Bird Slicer IFF. The upgrade is being carried out by Indonesian companies supervised by Lockheed Martin in Skadron Teknik 042.

In January 2020, the Indonesian Minister of Defence, Prabowo Subianto during a bilateral meeting in France and met with his French counterpart Florence Parly, it was reported that the Ministry is interested on French military equipment including 48 Dassault Rafales, four Scorpène-class submarines and two Gowind-class corvettes.

On 12 March 2020, Bloomberg reported that Indonesia had cancelled the Su-35 deal due to diplomatic pressure from the United States. Indonesia instead opted to negotiate the purchase of F-35 aircraft. This was later denied and Russia ensured that the cooperation would continue, although there were still a number of things to discuss. On 8 July 2020 however, the Russian Ambassador to Indonesia, Lyudmila Vorobieva stated that Indonesia's plan to buy 11 Sukhoi Su-35 fighter jets from Russia is still continuing.

On 20 July 2020, a letter written by defence minister Prabowo Subianto to his Austrian counterpart Klaudia Tanner, was published by Indonesian news outlets expressing interest in acquiring Austria's Luftstreitkräfte entire fleet of Eurofighter Typhoon jets.

On 18 February 2021, the Chief of Staff of the Air Force Air Chief Marshal Fadjar Prasetyo announced in the annual Air Force Leadership Meeting that the Indonesian Air Force plans to buy 36 Dassault Rafales and 8 F-15EX Strike Eagle, of which 6 F-15EX are expected to arrive in 2022, along with C-130J Super Hercules and Medium-altitude long-endurance unmanned aerial vehicle. The Air Chief Marshal also stated that the Air Force will modernize its various fleet of combat aircraft, whose implementation will begin in 2021.

In November 2021, Airbus confirmed that the Indonesian Ministry of Defence had signed a deal with Airbus for 2 A400Ms configured for MRTT role, with an option, in the form of a letter of intent, for four additional aircraft.

On 22 December 2021 during a Press Tour and Media Gathering, the Air Chief Marshall Fadjar Prasetyo confirmed that the Su-35 purchase will not go ahead. Regarding the planned purchase of the Sukhoi Su-35, Fadjar said it would be abandoned.

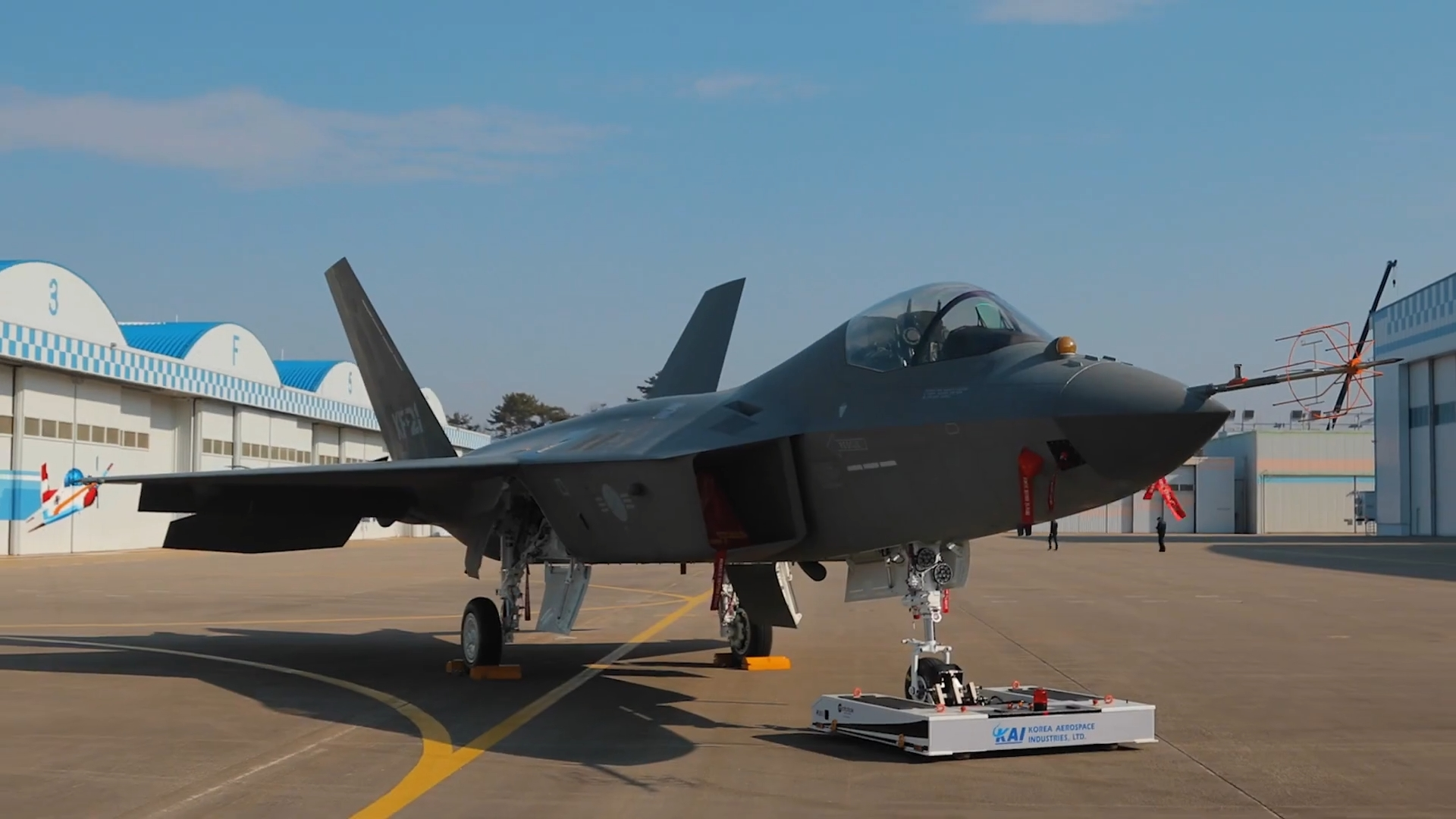
Prototype of the KAI KF-21 Air superiority fighter

Indonesia has ambitious plans for a homemade future 4.5 generation jet fighter with South Korea's KAI and Indonesia's IAe, the KF-X/IF-X. On November 11, 2021, it was reported that South Korea and Indonesia had reached an agreement on the payment which Indonesia would have to make for their joint fighter jet project after concerns that Jakarta would default on the deal. Under the renegotiated agreement, Indonesia will have to pay 1.6 trillion won ($1.35 billion) of the 8.1 trillion-won project.

On 10 February 2022, Dassault Aviation stated that Indonesia has officially signed an order for 42 Dassault Rafale F4s, concluding two years of negotiations with 6 aircraft for Batch I. Hours later the State Department of the United States approved Indonesia to purchase up to 36 F-15ID aircraft, the would-be Indonesian variant of the F-15EX.

On 20 April 2022, PT Len Industri and Thales Group signed a strategic partnership agreement for further collaboration on a wide array of defence-related topics including radars, military satellites, electronic warfare, UAVs and combat management systems.

On 17 May 2022, PT Len Industri signed an agreement with Thales Group to jointly produce 13 GCI radars. Thales will be partnering with state-owned defence electronics firm PT Len Industri to supply Ground Master 403 (GM403) air surveillance radars and SkyView command-and-control (C2) system to Indonesia. On 18 June 2023 in a joint statement by Thales and PT Len it is revealed that Indonesia is ordering the Ground Master 400 Alpha (GM400α) variant.

Indonesia has considered acquiring 12 used Mirage 2000-5s from Qatar. In November 2022, the Ministry of Finance of Indonesia has approved foreign loans to fund several Indonesian Air Force procurement programs, including the ex-Qatari Mirage 2000-5 proposal. In January 2024, the spokesperson for the Minister of Defence disclosed the planned procurement of Mirage 2000s has been postponed, citing fiscal limitations. On 9 February 2024, spokesperson for the Minister of Defence confirmed the plan to acquire Mirages have been cancelled. The Air Force also conducts aerial reconnaissance over Indonesia's maritime territory and outer islands, including the country's three designated archipelagic sea lanes, supporting surveillance of activities such as illegal fishing, smuggling and unauthorized border crossings.

=== Optimum Essential Force (2024–present) ===
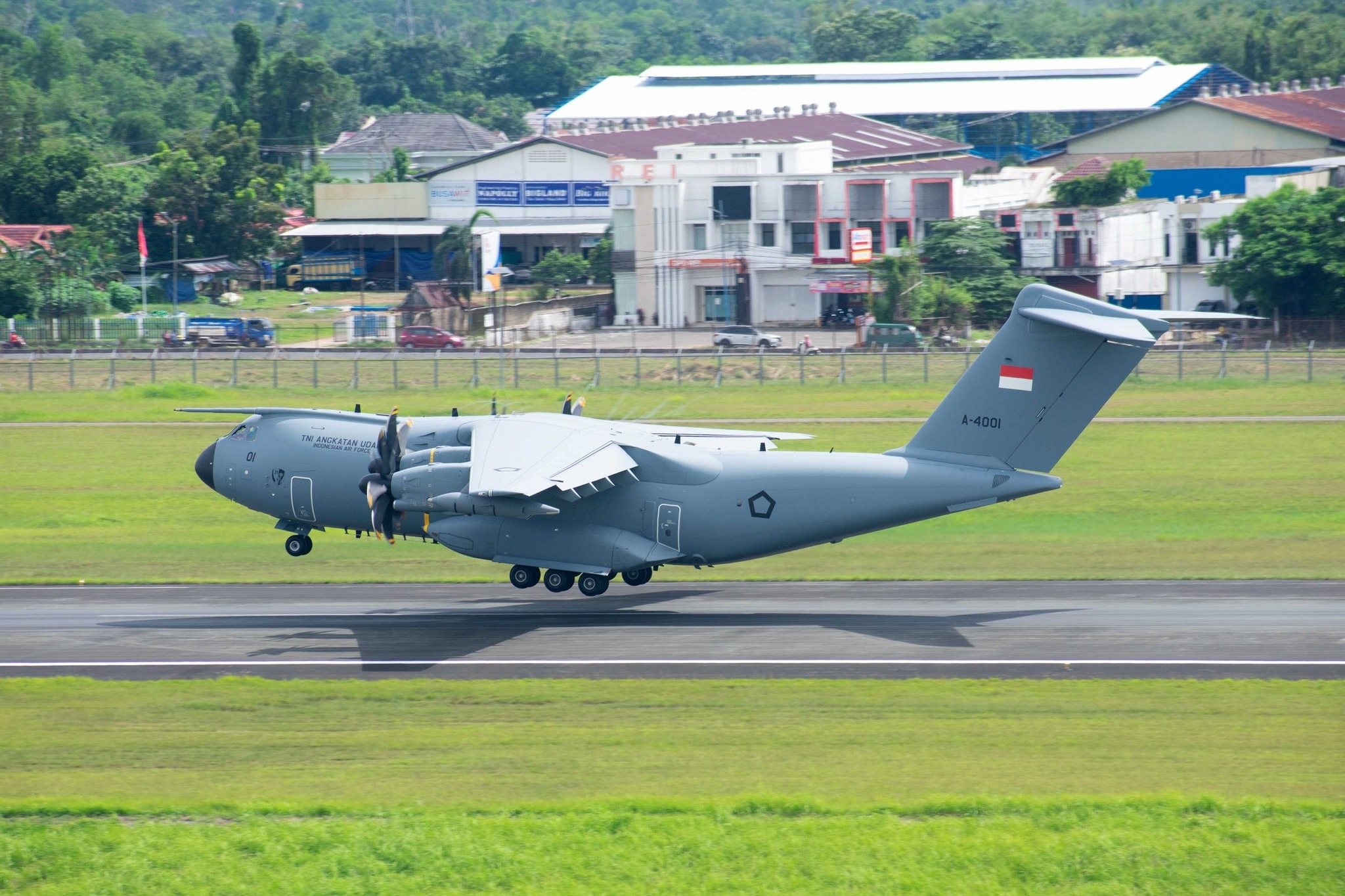
Indonesian Air Force A400M Atlas at Sjamsudin Noor Air Force Base

During Indo Defense Expo 2025, Indonesia signed a memorandum of understanding with TAI for 48 TF Kaan aircraft valued at $10 billion. Indonesia signed a purchase contract for the TF Kaan on 26 July.

The first three Dassault Rafales were delivered on 23 January 2026. Another three would be delivered in April 2026.

== Organization ==
The Indonesian Air Force is structured into the following in accordance with Presidential decree No. 84/2025:

=== Leadership Elements ===
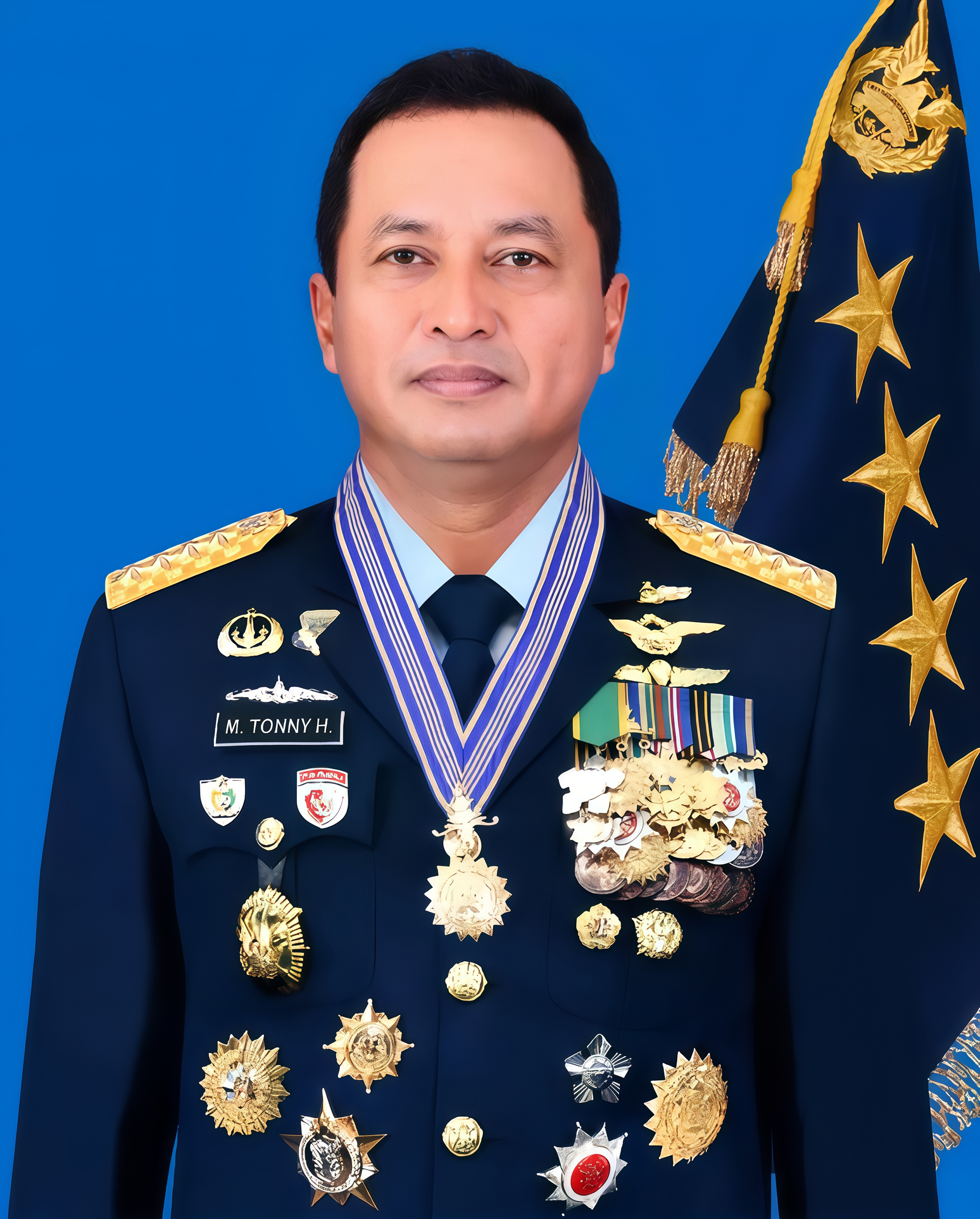
The current Chief of Staff of the Air Force, Air Chief Marshal Mohamad Tony Harjono

- Chief of Staff of the Air Force (Kepala Staf Angkatan Udara), position held by a four-star Air Chief Marshal.
- Deputy Chief of Staff of the Air Force (Wakil Kepala Staf Angkatan Udara), position held by a three-star Air Marshal.

=== Leadership Support Element ===
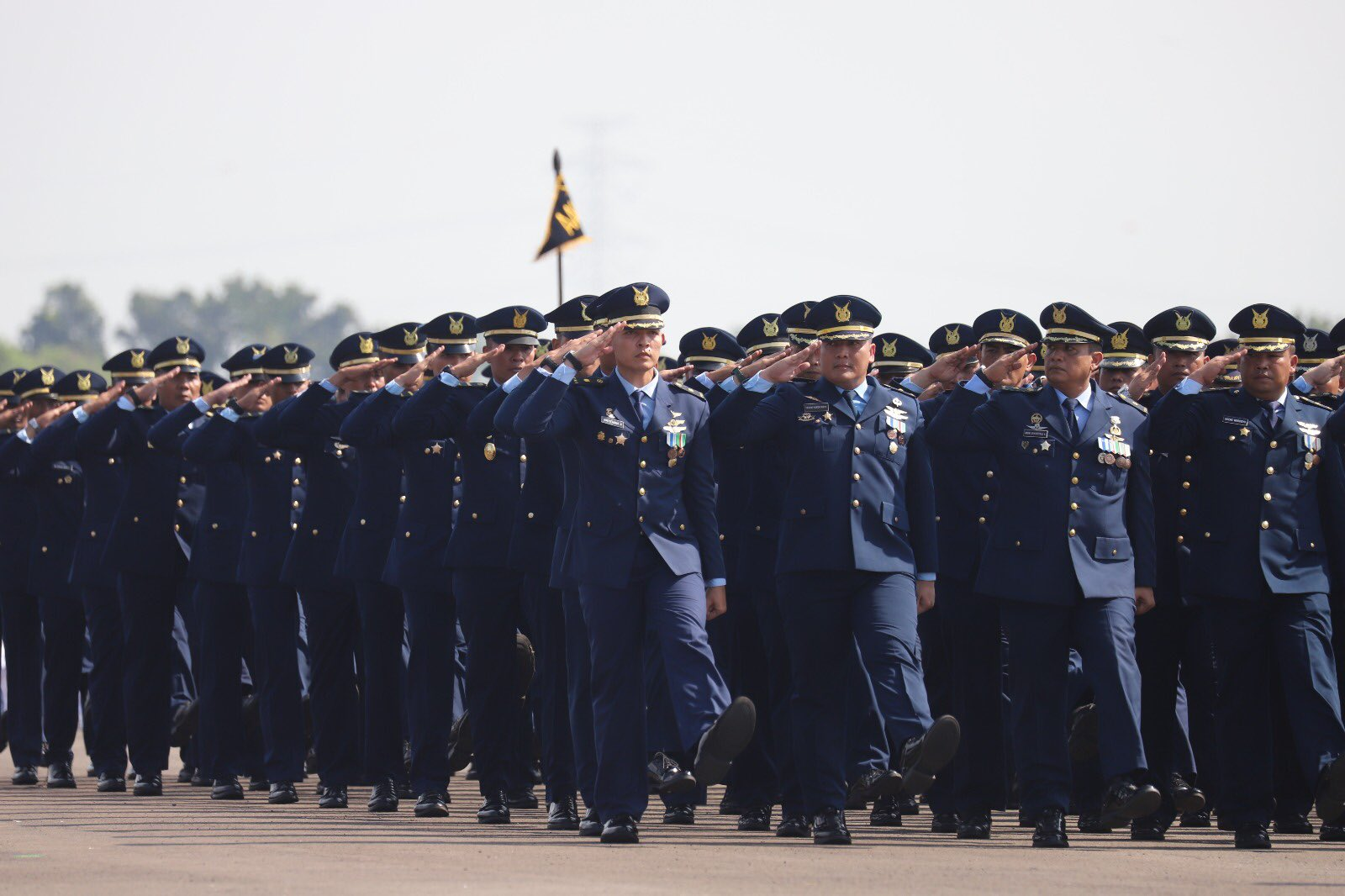
Indonesian Air Force officers

1. Inspectorate General of the Air Force (Inspektorat Jenderal Angkatan Udara), position held by a three-star Air Marshal.
2. Advisory Staff to the Air Force Chief of Staff (Staf Ahli Kepala Staf Angkatan Udara);
3. Air Force Planning and Budgeting Staff (Staf Perencanaan dan Anggaran TNI Angkatan Udara);
4. Air Force Intelligence Staff (Staf Intelijen TNI Angkatan Udara);
5. Air Force Operations Staff (Staf Operasi TNI Angkatan Udara);
6. Air Force Personnel Staff (Staf Personalia TNI Angkatan Udara);
7. Air Force Logistics Staff (Staf Logistik TNI Angkatan Udara);
8. Air Force Territorial Staff (Staf Teritorial TNI Angkatan Udara); and
9. Air Force Communications and Electronics Staff (Staf Komunikasi dan Elektronika TNI Angkatan Udara).

=== Service element ===
- Air Force Headquarters and HQ Detachment (Detasemen Markas Besar TNI Angkatan Udara), position held by 1-star Air Commodore.

=== Central Executive Agencies under Air Force Headquarters ===
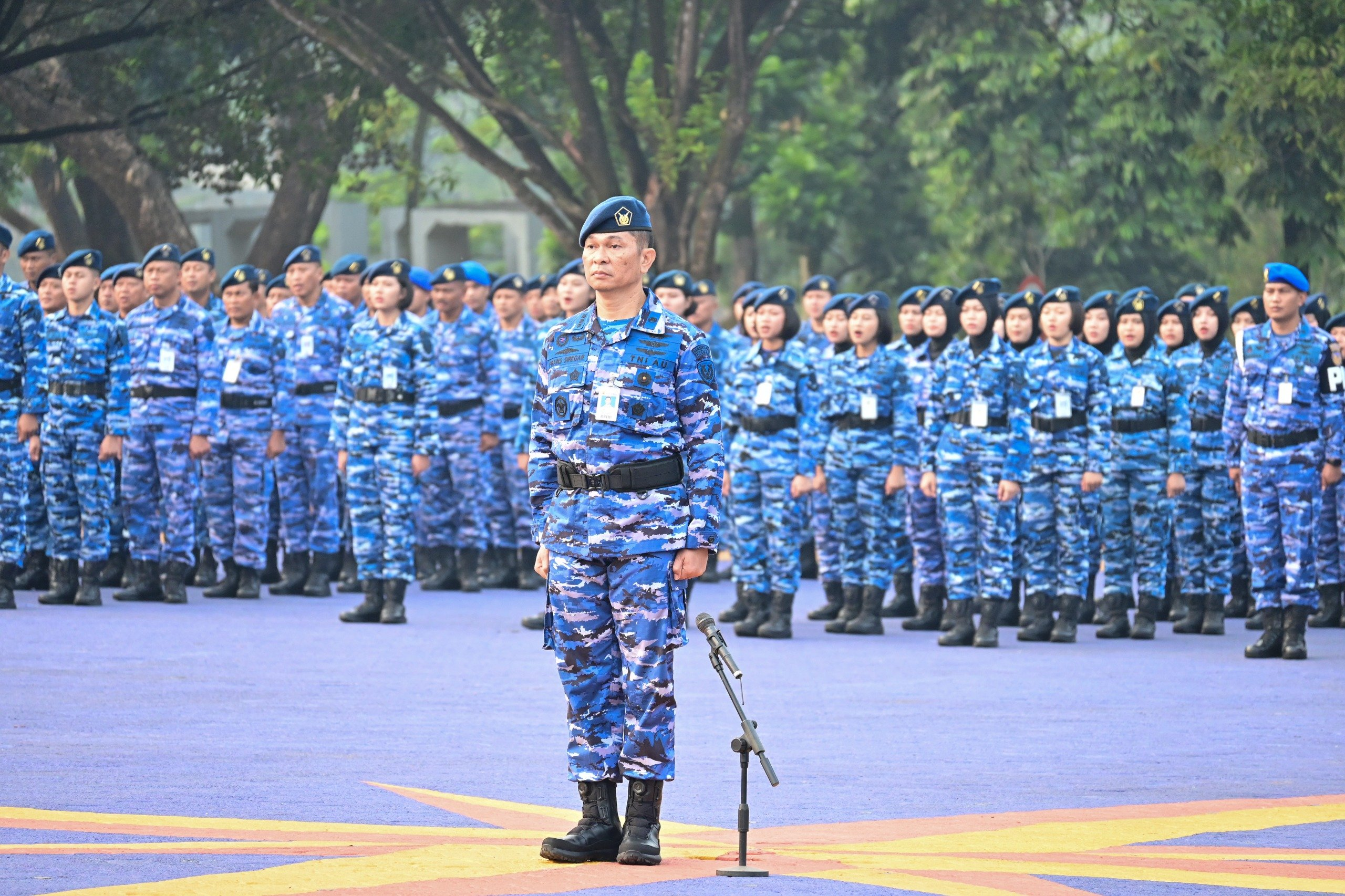
Indonesian Air Force members, wearing the Air Force "PDL SBP" or Swa Bhuwana Paksa camouflage.

Centers

1. Air Force Airworthiness, Aviation Safety and Occupational Center (Pusat Kelaikan, Keselamatan Terbang dan Kerja TNI Angkatan Udara), led by 2-star Air Vice Marshall;
2. Air Force Military Police Center (Pusat Polisi Militer TNI Angkatan Udara), led by 2-star Air Vice Marshall;
3. Air Force Medical Center (Pusat Kesehatan TNI Angkatan Udara), led by 2-star Air Vice Marshall. It directly oversee Suhardi Hardjolukito Central Air Force Hospital and R. Poerwanto Air Force Oral and Dental Health Institute, while other Air Force hospitals are controlled by various territorial units;
4. Air Force Geospatial Center (Pusat Geospasial TNI Angkatan Udara), led by 2-star Air Vice Marshall;
5. Air Force Materiel Logistics Center (Pusat Pembekalan Materiel TNI Angkatan Udara), led by 1-star Air Commodore;
6. Air Force Territorial Center (Pusat Teritorial TNI Angkatan Udara), led by 1-star Air Commodore; and
7. Air Force State-owned Properties Center (Pusat Barang Milik Negara TNI Angkatan Udara), led by 1-star Air Commodore.

Academies

1. Indonesian Air Force Academy (Akademi TNI Angkatan Udara), led by an Academy Governor, holding the rank of 2-star Air Vice Marshal; and
2. Air Force Staff and Command College (Sekolah Staf dan Komando TNI Angkatan Udara), led by a Staff and Command College Commandant, with the rank of 2-star Air Vice Marshal.

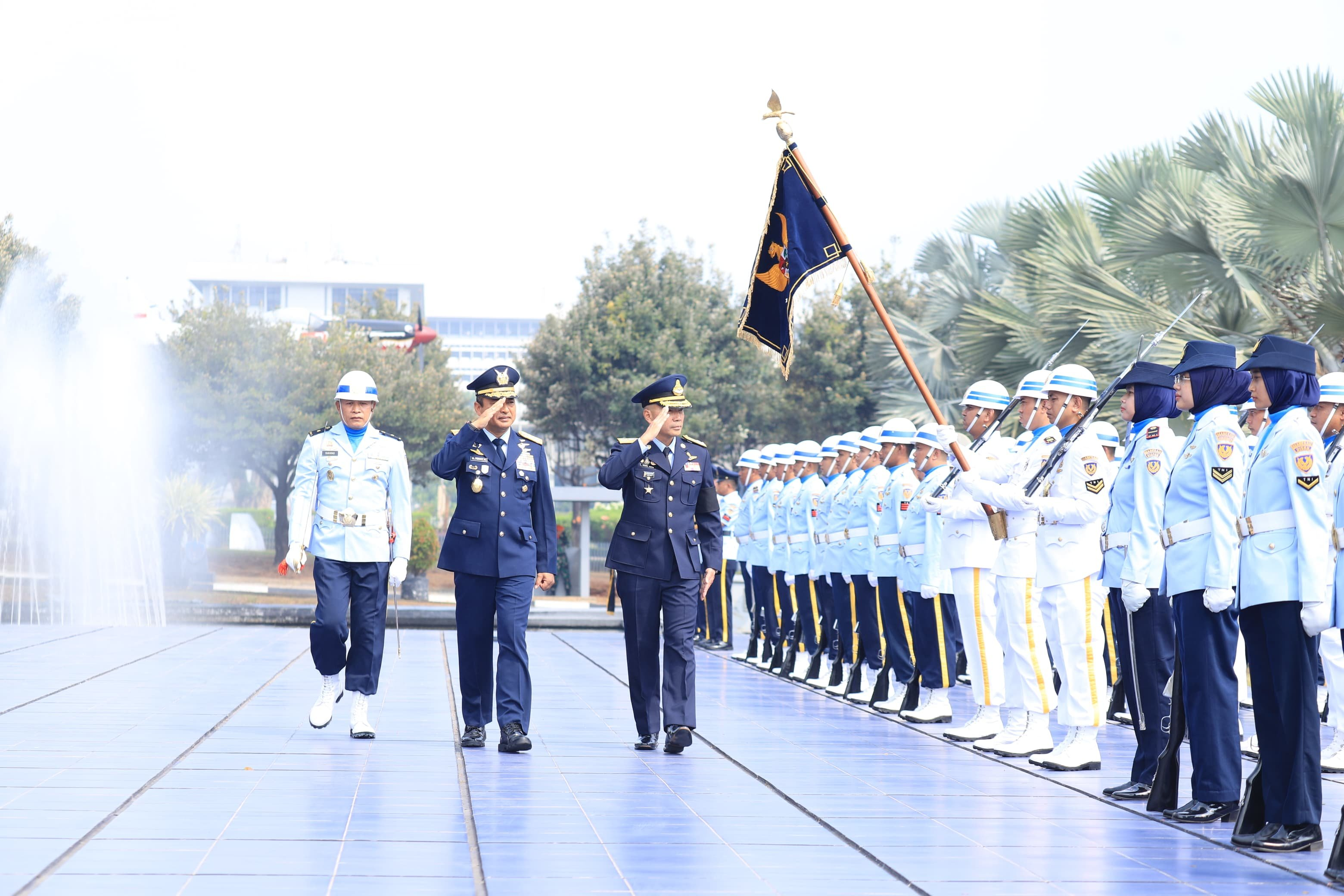
Indonesian Air Force honor guards during a visit by Commander-in-Chief of the RTAF in 2026

Services

1. Air Force Finance Service (Dinas Keuangan TNI Angkatan Udara), led by 1-star Air Commodore;
2. Air Force Information and Data Processing Service (Dinas Informasi dan Pengolahan Data TNI Angkatan Udara), led by 1-star Air Commodore;
3. Air Force Research and Development Service (Dinas Penelitian dan Pengembangan TNI Angkatan Udara), led by 1-star Air Commodore;
4. Air Force Security and Cypher Service (Dinas Pengamanan dan Sandi);
5. Air Force Public Relations Service (Dinas Penerangan), led by 1-star Air Commodore;
6. Air Force Operational Development Service (Dinas Pengembangan Operasional), led by 1-star Air Commodore;
7. Air Force Justice Service (Dinas Hukum), led by 1-star Air Commodore;
8. Air Force Personnel Administration Service (Dinas Administrasi Personel), led by 1-star Air Commodore;
9. Air Force Education Service (Dinas Pendidikan), led by 1-star Air Commodore;
10. Air Force Personnel Maintenance Service (Dinas Perawatan Personel), led by 1-star Air Commodore;
11. Air Force Psychology Service (Dinas Psikologi), led by 1-star Air Commodore;
12. Air Force Materiel Service (Dinas Materiel), led by 1-star Air Commodore;
13. Air Force Aeronautics Service (Dinas Aeronautika), led by 1-star Air Commodore;
14. Air Force Communications and Electronics Service (Dinas Komunikasi dan Elektronika), led by 1-star Air Commodore;
15. Air Force Construction Service (Dinas Konstruksi), led by 1-star Air Commodore;
16. Air Force Fixed Assets Management Service (Dinas Barang Tidak Bergerak), led by 1-star Air Commodore;
17. Air Force Procurement Service (Dinas Pengadaan), led by 1-star Air Commodore;
18. Air Force Operations and Training Service (Dinas Operasi dan Latihan), led by 1-star Air Commodore;
19. Air Force Mental Guidance and Chaplaincy Service (Dinas Pembinaan Mental TNI Angkatan Udara), led by 1-star Air Commodore;
20. Air Force Physical Fitness Service (Dinas Pembinaan Jasmani TNI Angkatan Udara), led by 1-star Air Commodore;
21. Air Force Historical Heritage Center (Dinas Sejarah TNI Angkatan Udara), led by 1-star Air Commodore;
22. Saryanto Space and Aviation Medical Agency (Lembaga Kesehatan Penerbangan dan Ruang Angkasa Saryanto), led by 1-star Air Commodore; and
23. Air Force Cyber Unit (Satuan Siber TNI Angkatan Udara), led by 1-star Air Commodore.
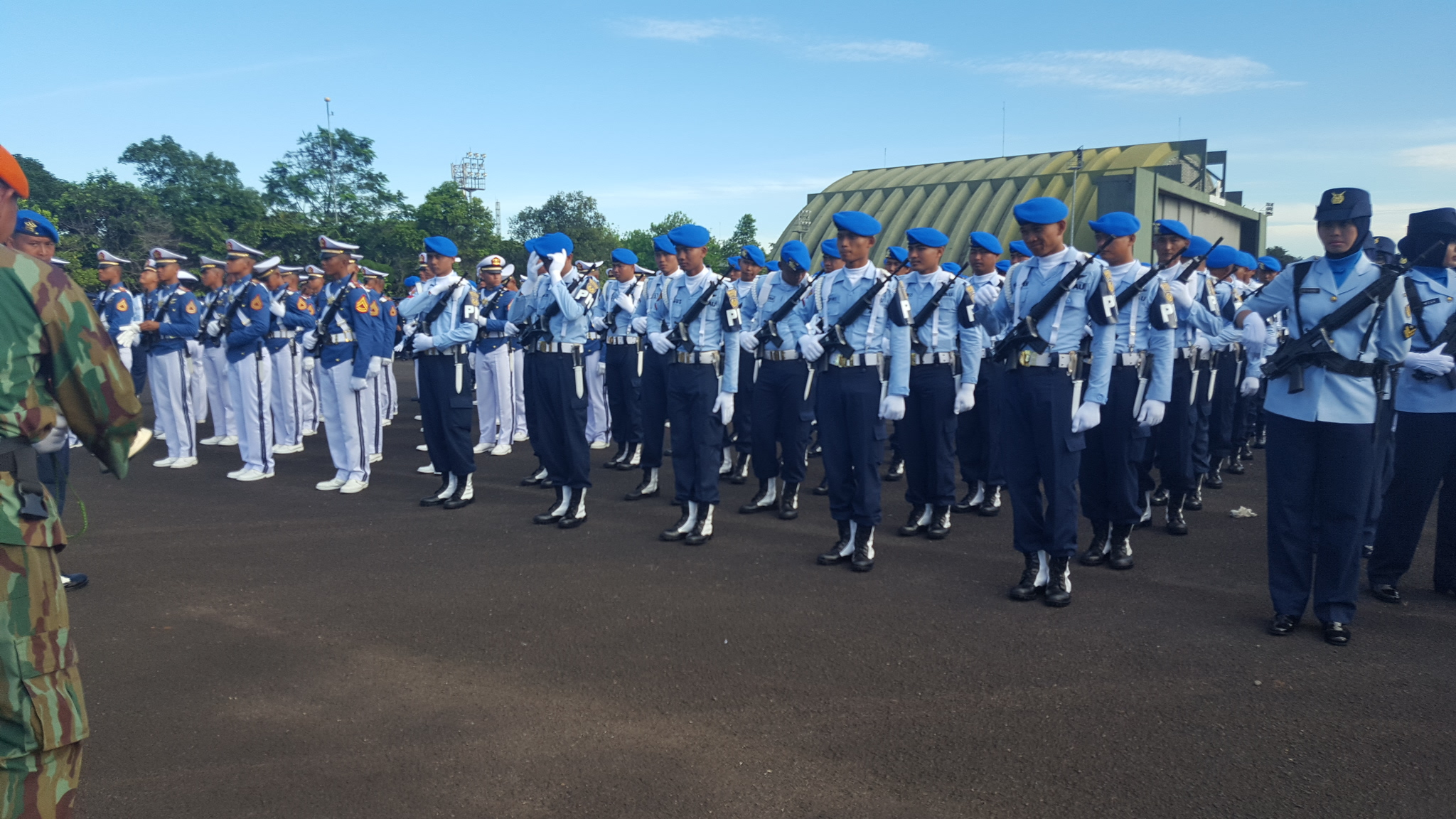
  Air Force Academy cadets (left), Air Force Military Police (center), and Air Force female personnel (right)
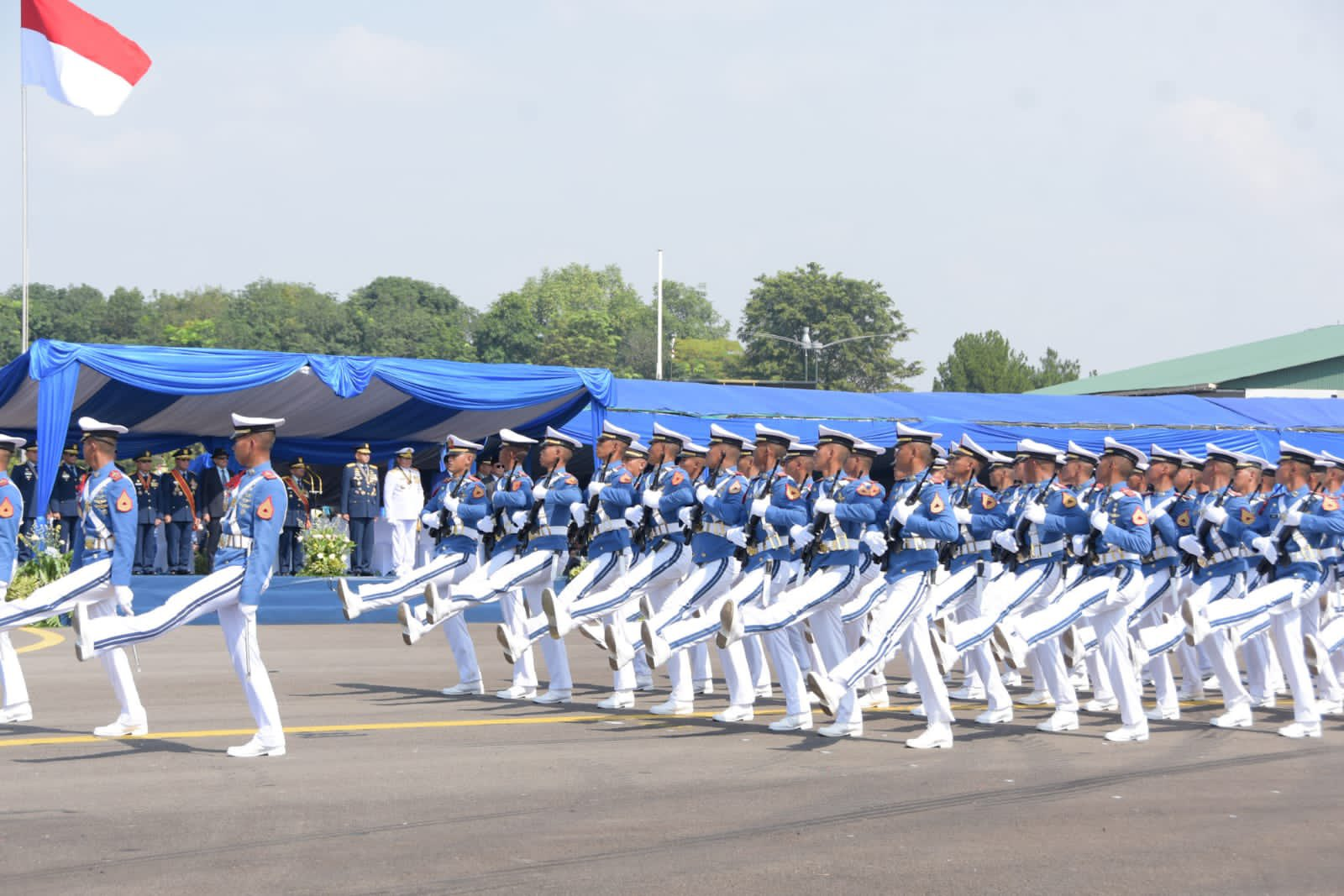
  Indonesian Air Force Academy cadets during a parade procession for the 77th Anniversary of the Indonesian Air Force

=== Principal Commands ===
1. National Air Operation Command (Komando Operasi Udara Nasional), headquartered in Halim Perdanakusuma Air Force Base, Jakarta Timur. The command oversees Air Force bases under the territorial Air Force Regional Commands, as well as radar units and air wings under Air Force Operations Command.
  - 1st Air Force Regional Command (Komando Daerah TNI Angkatan Udara 1) oversees Air Force bases in western Indonesia;
  - 2nd Air Force Regional Command (Komando Daerah TNI Angkatan Udara 2) oversees Air Force bases in central Indonesia;
  - 3rd Air Force Regional Command (Komando Daerah TNI Angkatan Udara 3) oversees Air Force bases in eastern Indonesia; and
  - Air Force Operations Command (Komando Operasi TNI Angkatan Udara):
    - 1st Sector Command (Medan) oversees radar units in Sumatra;
    - 2nd Sector Command (Makassar) oversees radar units in Borneo and Celebes;
    - 3rd Sector Command (Biak Numfor) oversees radar units in Papua and the Mollucas;
    - 4th Sector Command (Jakarta) oversees radar units in Java;
    - 1st Group (Transport)
      - 11th Air Wing (Halim Perdanakusuma AFB, Jakarta)
      - 12th Air Wing (Abdul Rachman Saleh AFB, Malang)
      - 13th Air Wing (Manuhua AFB, Biak)
    - 2nd Group (Helicopter)
      - 21st Air Wing (Atang Sendjaja AFB, Bogor)
      - 22nd Air Wing (Suryadarma AFB, Subang)
      - 23rd Air Wing (Silas Papare AFB, Jayapura)
    - 3rd Group (Combat)
      - 31st Air Wing (Roesmin Nurjadin AFB, Pekanbaru)
      - 32nd Air Wing (Iswahjudi AFB, Madiun)
      - 33rd Air Wing (Sultan Hasanuddin AFB, Makassar)
    - 4th Group (Special)
      - 41st Air Wing (UCAV) (Supadio AFB, Pontianak)
      - 42nd Air Wing (C4ISR) (Sultan Hasanuddin AFB, Makassar)
  - National Air Operation Command Space Unit (Satuan Antariksa Koopsudnas);
2. Quick Reaction Forces Corps (Korps Pasukan Gerak Cepat), also known as Korpasgat, is a corps-level Air Force special infantry forces, led by 3-star Air Marshall. It is the counterpart to Navy's Marine Corps and Army's Kostrad;
3. Indonesian Air Force Training, Education and Doctrine Development Command (Komando Pembinaan Doktrin, Pendidikan, dan Latihan TNI Angkatan Udara), led by 3-star Air Marshall:
  - 100th Training Wing/Flight (Wing Pendidikan 100/Terbang) in Adisutjipto Air Force Base, Yogyakarta;
  - 200th Training Wing/Electronics (Wing Pendidikan 200/Elektronika);
  - 300th Training Wing/Engineering (Wing Pendidikan 300/Teknik) in Suryadarma Air Force Base, Subang and Husein Sastranegara Air Force Base, Bandung;
  - 400th Training Wing/First Education, Formation and Vocational (Wing Pendidikan 400/Pendidikan Pertama, Pembentukan dan Kejuruan);
  - 500th Training Wing/General (Wing Pendidikan 500/Umum) in Halim Perdanakusuma Air Force Base, Jakarta and Atang Senjaya Air Force Base, Bogor;
  - 600th Training Wing/Provisions (Wing Pendidikan 600/Pembekalan);
  - 700th Training Wing/Air Defence (Wing Pendidikan 700/Pertahanan Udara); and
  - 800th Training Wing/Quick Reaction Forces (Wing Pendidikan 800/Pasukan Gerak Cepat).
4. Indonesian Air Force Materiel Maintenance Command (Komando Pemeliharaan Materiel TNI Angkatan Udara), led by 2-star Air Vice Marshall:
  - 10th Air Force Maintenance Depot in Husein Sastranegara Air Force Base, Bandung;
  - 20th Air Force Maintenance Depot in Iswahyudi Air Force Base, Madiun;
  - 30th Air Force Maintenance Depot in Abdul Rachman Saleh Air Force Base, Malang;
  - 40th Air Force Maintenance Depot in Sulaiman Airbase (id), Bandung;
  - 50th Air Force Maintenance Depot in Adi Soemarmo Air Force Base, Surakarta;
  - 60th Air Force Maintenance Depot in Iswahyudi Air Force Base, Madiun;
  - 70th Air Force Maintenance Depot in Sulaiman Airbase (id), Bandung;
  - 80th Air Force Maintenance Depot in Iswahyudi Air Force Base, Madiun; and
  - 90th Air Force Maintenance Depot in Suryadarma Air Force Base, Subang.

== Service branches ==
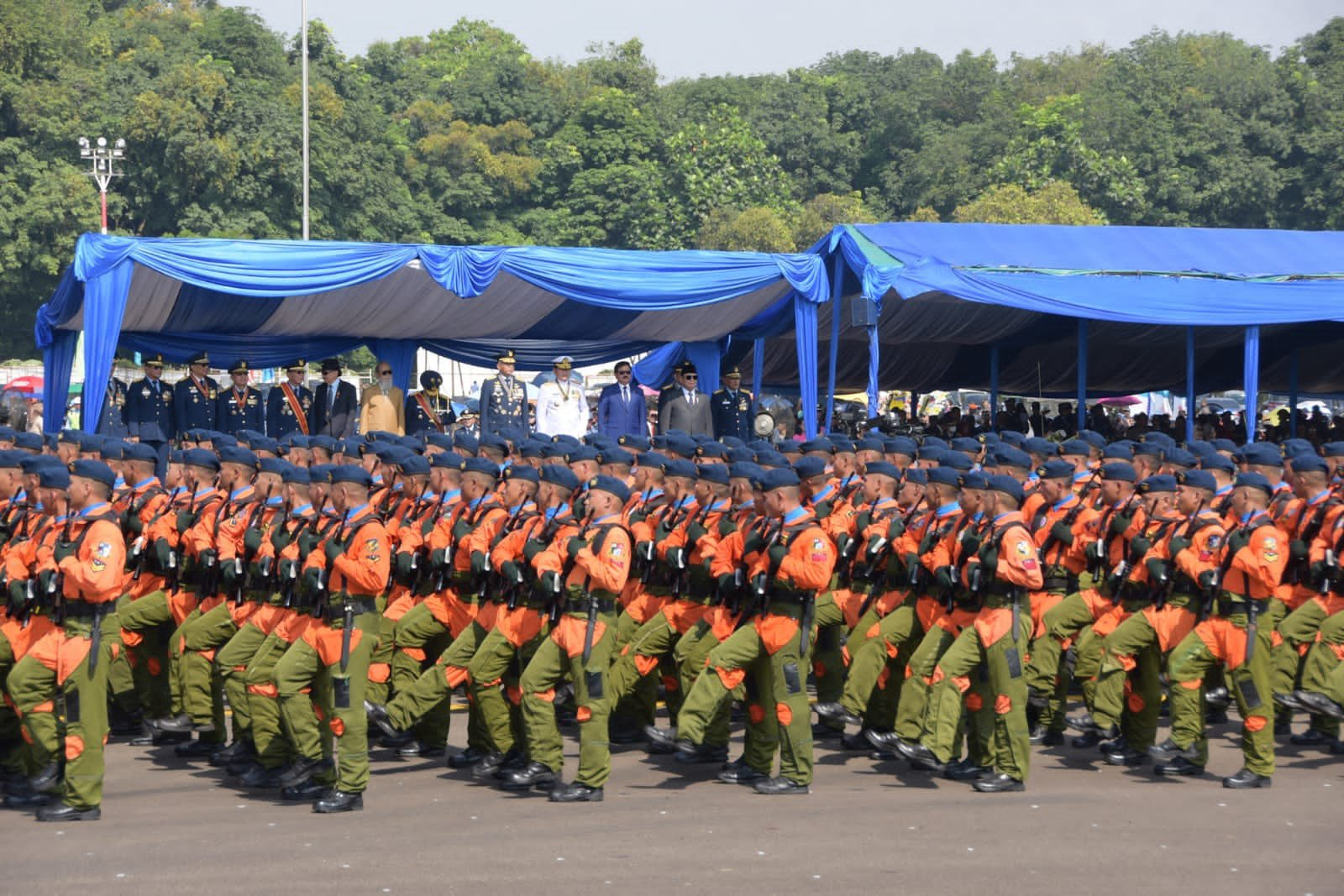
Indonesian Air Force air crews, their Air Squadron SSI patches can be seen on the left arm

Combat branches

1. Pilot Corps (Korps Penerbang) (PNB), such as Fighter Pilot, Transport Pilot, and Helicopter Pilot, all officers only.
2. Quick Reaction Force Command Corps (Korps Komando Pasukan Gerak Cepat) (PAS), air force infantry and special forces corps, wears orange beret.

Support branches

1. Navigator Corps (Korps Navigator) (NAV), all officers only.
2. Aviation Engineering Corps (Korps Teknik) (TEK). NCOs and enlists are further subdivided into following specialties:
  - Aviation Engineering (Teknik Pesawat Terbang);
  - Aviation Weaponry Engineering (Teknik Senjata); and
  - Support Engineering (Teknik Sarana Bantuan).
3. Electronics Corps (Korps Elektronika) (LEK). NCOs and enlists are further subdivided into following specialties:
  - Avionics (Avionik);
  - Radar System (Radar);
  - Simulator System (Simulasi);
  - Communication System (Komunikasi);
  - Air Traffic Control (Pengatur Lalu Lintas Udara); and
  - Informatics (Informatika / IT) formerly known as Electronic Data Processing (Pengolahan Data Elektronik).
4. Administration Corps (Korps Administrasi) (ADM). NCOs and enlists are further subdivided into following specialties:
  - Personnel Administration (Administrasi Personel);
  - Secretariat Administration (Administrasi Sekretariat); and
  - Finance Administration (Administrasi Keuangan).
5. Supply Corps (Korps Perbekalan) (KAL).
6. Military Police Corps (Korps Polisi Militer) (POM), all personnel wear light blue berets or MP helmets.
7. Medical Corps (Korps Kesehatan) (KES). NCOs and enlists are further subdivided into following specialties:
  - Medicine (Kedokteran);
  - Psychology (Psikologi);
  - Nursing (Perawat); and
  - Dentistry (Kedokteran Gigi).
8. Legal Corps (Korps Hukum) (KUM).
9. Special Service Corps (Korps Dinas Khusus) (SUS). All personnels are further subdivided into following specialties:
  - Intelligence (Intelijen);
  - Military Band (Musik);
  - Public Relations and Media (Penerangan);
  - Facilities and Instruments (Fasilitas dan Instrumen);
  - Chaplaincy (Pembinaan Mental);
  - Foreign Languages (Bahasa Asing);
  - Meteorology (Meteorologi); and
  - Physical Fitness and Sports (Jasmani).

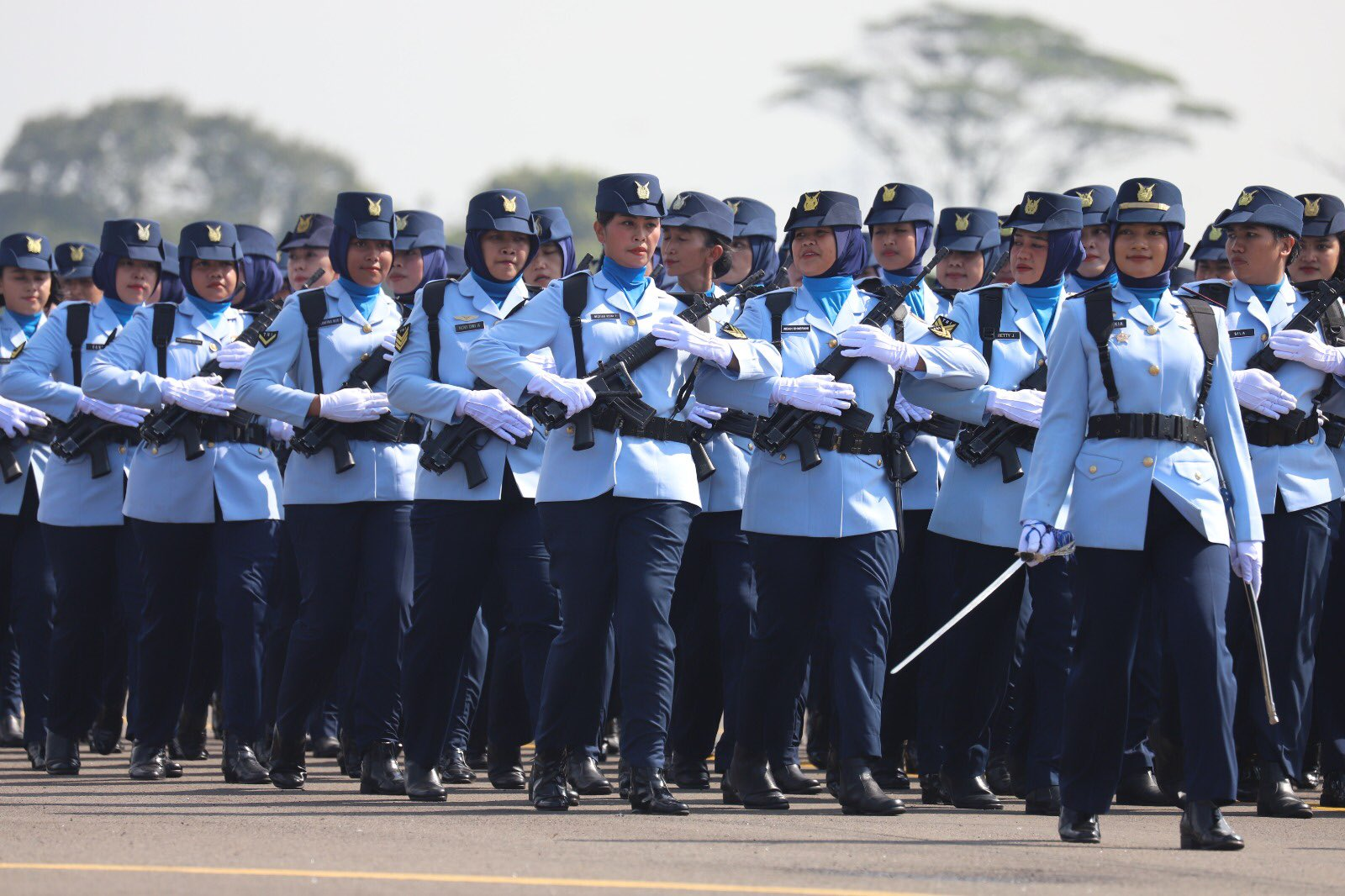
Air Force Women (Wara) personnel

Air Force Women (Wanita Angkatan Udara) (W) - Wara is not a separate corps, its membership is integrated into the corps/branches that apply in the Air Force environment, the same as other male military members. All personnel wear crusher caps save Korpasgat who wear orange berets and military policewomen who wear as specified above.

== Air Force bases and squadrons ==
Indonesian Air Force air force bases consist of three types (A/B/C) and placed under National Air Operations Command as follows:

- 1st Air Force Regional Command, consist of 5 type A Air Force Bases, 8 type B Air Force Bases, and 7 type C Air Force Bases.
- 2nd Air Force Regional Command, consist of 5 type A Air Force Bases, 5 type B Air Force Bases, and 2 type C Air Force Bases.
- 3rd Air Force Regional Command, consist of 2 type A Air Force Bases, 2 type B Air Force Bases, and 3 type C Air Force Bases.

== Equipment of the Air Force ==
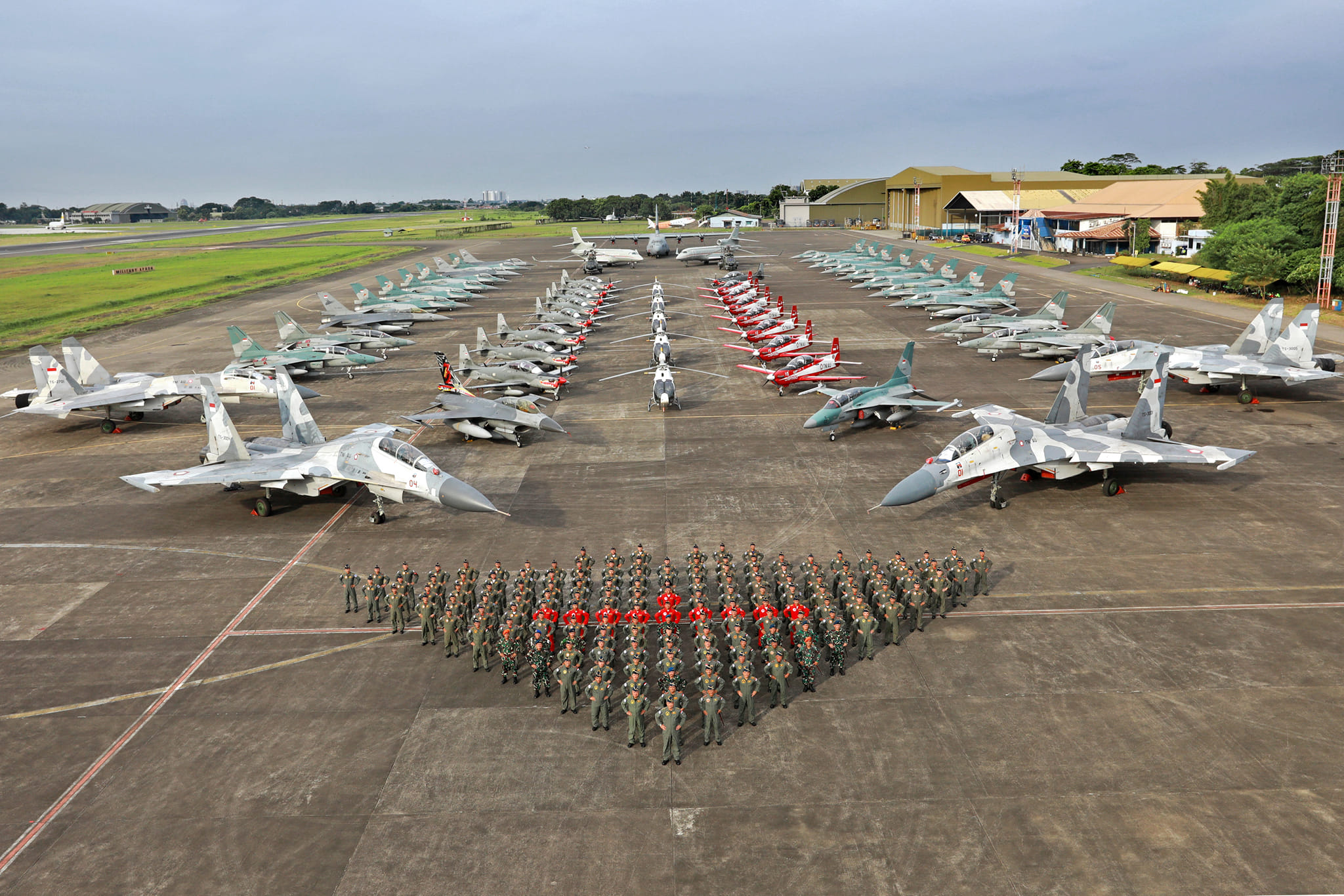
Indonesian Air Force equipment during the 77th Anniversary Parade in Halim Perdanakusuma AFB

Indonesian Air Force tail numbering systems uses one or two letters based on the aircraft's roles, followed by two numbers of the aircraft model, and two numbers of the serial number of the aircraft. Indonesian Air Force tail numbering is structured into the following in accordance with Decree of the Chief of Staff of the Air Force Number 05/III/1979 regarding the Assignment of Aircraft Registration Numbers:

- A – Angkut (Transport)
  - 07 for Dassault Falcon 7X
  - 08 for Dassault Falcon 8X
  - 13 for Lockheed C-130
  - 21 for NC212
  - 23 for CN235
  - 29 for CN295
  - 40 for Airbus A400M
  - 73 for Boeing 737
- AI – Angkut Intai (Transport Recon)
  - 23 for CN235
  - 73 for Boeing 737
- H – Helikopter (Helicopter)
  - 22 for Airbus Helicopters H225M (Late)
  - 32 for AS332
- HL – Helikopter Latih (Helicopter Trainer)
  - 12 for EC120
- HR – Helikopter Rescue (Rescue Helicopter)
  - 13 for AW139
  - 15 for Bo 105
  - 26 for Bell 206 (retired)
  - 36 for AS365
- HT – Helikopter Tempur (Combat Helicopter)
  - 33 for SA330
  - 72 for Eurocopter EC725 (Early)
- L – Latih (Trainer)
  - 17 for Cessna 172S SP
  - 18 for Cessna 182T
- LD – Latih Dasar (Basic Trainer)
  - 12 for Grob G 120TP
- LK – Latih Khusus (Special Trainer)
  - 26 for SF.260 (retired)
- LL – Latih Lanjut (Advance Trainer)
  - 01 for KAI KT-1B (previously LD)
- LM – Latih Mula (Early Trainer)
  - 20 for AS-202 (retired; replaced by G 120TP)
- T – Tempur (Fighter)
  - 03 for Dassault Rafale
  - 27 for Sukhoi Su-27 (Late)
  - 30 for Sukhoi Su-30 (Late)
  - 50 for T-50i (Late)
- TB – Tempur Bom (Fighter Bomber)
- TI – Tempur Intai (Fighter Recon)
- TL – Tempur Latih (Fighter Trainer)
  - 01 for BAE Hawk 109
- TS – Tempur Sergap (Fighter Intercept)
  - 16 for General Dynamics F-16
  - 27 for Sukhoi Su-27 (Early)
  - 30 for Sukhoi Su-30 (Early)
- TT – Tempur Tembak (Fighter Attack) or Tempur Taktis (Tactical Fighter)
  - 02 for BAE Hawk 209
  - 31 for Embraer EMB 314
  - 50 for KAI T-50i (Early)

== Rank structure ==
Command and Staff rank
An example of a Second lieutenant rank (left) with red band indicating a command rank. While (right) without red band indicating a staff rank.

In the Air Force, as well as in other armed forces branches in Indonesia, the rank consists of officer known as in Indonesian: "Perwira", NCO "Bintara" and enlisted "Tamtama".

The proper title to address of rank on official document are as follows, all high-ranking officers (Marshal) use their rank followed by "(TNI)", while other officers use their rank followed by respective branch/corps abbreviation. For example, an Air Force colonel from Flying Corps use the title "Kolonel (PNB)", while an Air Force Marshal from Flying Corps use the title "Marsekal (TNI)". Enlisted airmen are not required to put their respective branch/corps specialty.

Note: Indonesia is not a member of NATO, so there is not an official equivalence between the Indonesian military ranks and those defined by NATO. The displayed parallel is approximate and for illustration purposes only.

Note: The red banding on the rank insignia denotes the personnel holding a command position which is agnostic of rank.

=== Officers ===
Rank group	General/Flag/Air officers					Senior officers			Junior officers
Indonesian Air Force
Indonesian Air Force	Marsekal besar	Marsekal	Marsekal madya	Marsekal muda	Marsekal pertama	Kolonel	Letnan kolonel	Mayor	Kapten	Letnan satu	Letnan dua

=== Enlisted personnel ===
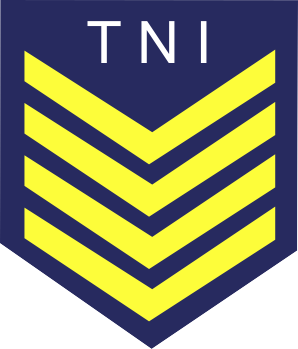
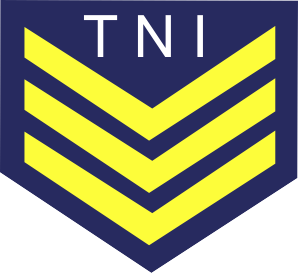
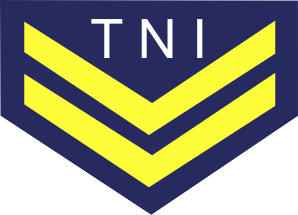
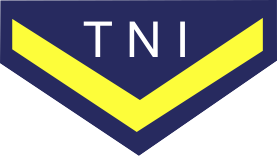
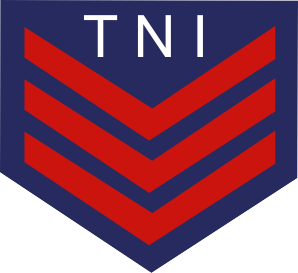
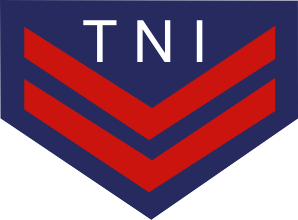
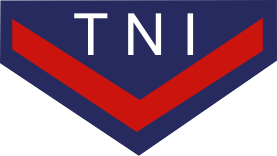
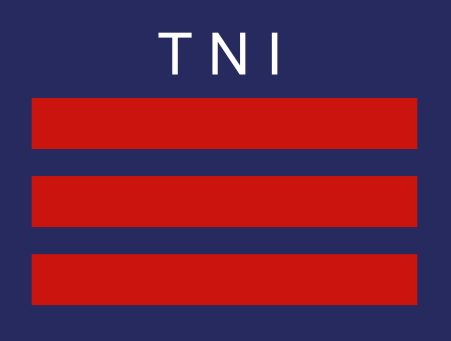
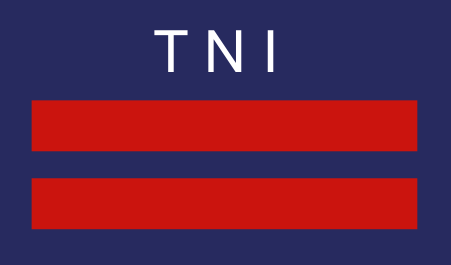
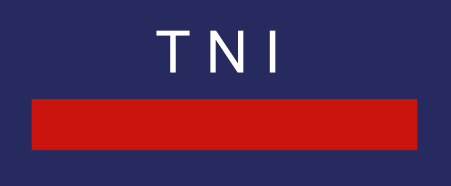
Rank group	Senior NCOs						Junior NCOs			Enlisted
Indonesian Air Force
Indonesian Air Force	Pembantu letnan satu	Pembantu letnan dua	Sersan mayor	Sersan kepala	Sersan satu	Sersan dua	Kopral kepala	Kopral satu	Kopral dua	Prajurit kepala	Prajurit satu	Prajurit dua

== Notable incidents ==
- A MiG-17 F-1112 strafed several strategic locations in Jakarta and Bogor on 9 March 1960. The fighter aircraft then crash landed in a paddy field in Garut. The aircraft was piloted by Lt. Daniel Maukar, an Air Force pilot affiliated with Permesta. He was tasked to strafe BPM fuel tanks at Tanjung Priok harbor, before attempting to assassinate President Sukarno by strafing Merdeka Palace and Bogor Palace. The incident is called the Maukar Incident.
- A Lockheed L-100-30 Hercules A-1322 crashed on 20 November 1985, killing all 10 crew on board. The aircraft crashed into Mount Sibayak. The aircraft was conducting routine air patrol over Sumatra.
- A Lockheed C-130 Hercules A-1324 crashed in Jakarta on 5 October 1991, killing 132 people comprising 119 passengers, 11 crew, and 2 people on ground. Only 1 survivor.
- An F-16 TS-1604, crashed in Tulungagung on 15 June 1992, but the pilot ejected safely
- An F-16 TS-1607, crashed at Halim Perdana Kusuma AB, on 10 March 1997, killing the pilot Cpt. Dwi Sasongko, who was with the "Elang Biru" acrobatic team, due to ejection seat failure.
- A Hawk Mk 53 T-5311 piloted by Maj. Syahbudin Nur Hutasuhut and Cpt. Masrial and another Hawk T-5310 piloted by Cpt. Andis Solichin and Cpt. Weko Nartomo from the 15 Air Squadron crashed in a mid-air collision during an acrobatic exercise at the Iswahjudi Air Force Base on March 28, 2002. All four pilots were killed.
- A Fokker F-27 A-2703 crashed on 6 April 2009, killing all 24 occupants comprising 6 crew, an instructor and 17 special forces trainees on board.
- A Lockheed L-100-30 Hercules, Model 382G-57C, A-1325, c/n 4917 crashed on 20 May 2009, killing at least 97 people and injuring 15 others, including some on the ground. The aircraft was carrying 98 passengers and 14 crew at the time and was travelling from Halim Perdanakusuma International Airport in Jakarta to West Papua via Sulawesi. Officials have stated that the plane crashed at about 6:30 a.m. around 5–7 kilometres from Iswahyudi Air Force Base. An official statement has not been released.
- A Fokker 27 A-2708 crashed on 21 June 2012, 10 people were killed, including all 7 crew on board the aircraft and 3 people on the ground. The aircraft crashed into a complex of military housing near Halim Perdanakusuma International Airport, and eight buildings were damaged or destroyed. The aircraft was conducting a routine training exercise.
- An F-16 TS-1643, was destroyed on 16 April 2015 when hydraulic brake failure caused the plane to catch fire and burnt the jet completely at Halim Perdana Kusuma AB. The pilot Lt. Col. Firman Dwi Cahyono escaped with burns.
- An F-16 TS-1609 crashed on 24 June 2015 when its nose landing gear collapsed upon landing at Iswahyudi AB, Madiun, East Java.
- On 30 June 2015, a Lockheed C-130B Hercules A-1310 crashed near a residential neighbourhood with 12 crew and 109 passengers on board shortly after taking off from Medan, killing all aboard, along with 22 people on the ground.
- 20 December 2015: An Indonesian Airforce T-50i Golden Eagle fighter plane registered as TT-5007 had crashed in a flight demonstration during airshow in Adisutjipto Air Force Base in Yogyakarta, killing its two pilots, Lt. Col. Marda Sarjono and Cpt. Dwi Cahyadi.
- On 18 December 2016 a Lockheed C-130H A-1334 crashed while landing at Wamena Airport, killing all 13 passengers and crew aboard.
- An F-16 TS-1603 skidded off the runway in during landing at the Roesmin Nurjadin Airbase, Pekanbaru, Sumatra on 14 March 2017 and slammed into the tarmac. The pilots, Maj. Andri Setiawan and 1st Lt. Marko Henderson, escaped injury.
- A Hawk 200 registered as TT-0209, crashed on 15 June 2020 around 5 kilometres from Roesmin Nurjadin Airbase, Pekanbaru. No casualties reported on this incident yet.
- A KAI T-50i TT-5006 skidded off the runway during takeoff at Iswahyudi Airbase, Magetan, East Java on 10 August 2020. The aircraft were piloted by Maj. Luluk Teguh Prabowo as instructor and 2nd Lt. Muhammad Zacky as flight cadet, both of them were injured. The aircraft were heavily damaged as the result. The instructor pilot later died on 2 September 2020.
- A KAI T-50i TT-5009 lost contact around Blora, Central Java on 18 July 2022. The aircraft was piloted by 1st Lt. Allan Safitra Indra Wahyudi, the flight was routine night exercise. Around 19:25 (+7 GMT) Local Time the aircraft lost contact around Blora, Madiun area and it was soon confirmed that the aircraft had crashed and the pilot had died in the accident.
- Two Super Tucano TT-3103 and TT-3111 crashed on 16 November 2023 in Pasuruan, East Java, near Abdul Rachman Saleh AFB of which serves as homebase for the Super Tucanos. All four crews died in the crash, including Commander of the 2nd Air Wing, and Commander of the 21st Air Squadron.

== See also ==
- Indonesian Air Force Academy
- Indonesian Army
- Indonesian Navy

== Bibliography ==
- Aero-News Network. "Indonesian Air Force Grounds OV-10 Bronco Fleet" 25 July 2007
- Angkasa (Sky) magazine, Gramedia, Jakarta No. 7 Year XVII April 2008
- Crouch, Harold (2007) The Army and Politics in Indonesia, Equinox, Jakarta ISBN 979-3780-50-9
- Davies, Steve (2008) Red Eagles: America's Secret MiGs Osprey Publishing ISBN 9781846039706
- Indonesian Air Force (1977). Catur Windu TNI-AU 1945-1977: Sejarah Bergambar [32 Years of Indonesian Air Force 1945-1977: An Illustrated History] (in Indonesian). Jakarta: Dinas Sejarah TNI Angkatan Udara.
- Indonesian Embassy, Ottawa: US to help RI in repair/refurbishing 15 of 24 RI's C-130 transport
- Green, William & Swanborough, Gordon (n.d.). "Pentagon Over the Islands: The Thirty-Year History of Indonesian Military Aviation". Air Enthusiast Quarterly (2): 154–162. ISSN 0143-5450.
- Grodin, Yefim & Rigmat, Vladimir (2004) Tupelov Tu-16 Badger , Aerofax, London ISBN 1-85780-177-6
- Poerwoko, F. Djoko (2001) My Home My Base: Perjalanan Sejarah Pangkalan Udara Iswahjudi 1939–2000, Publisher – Iswahjudi Air Force Base, No ISBN
- Scramble Magazine. "Indonesian Air Arms Overview"
- Willis, David (Ed). Aerospace Encyclopedia of the World's Air Forces. Aerospace Publishing, London, 1999 ISBN 1-86184-045-4
