= Crédit Foncier d'Algérie et de Tunisie =

French bank

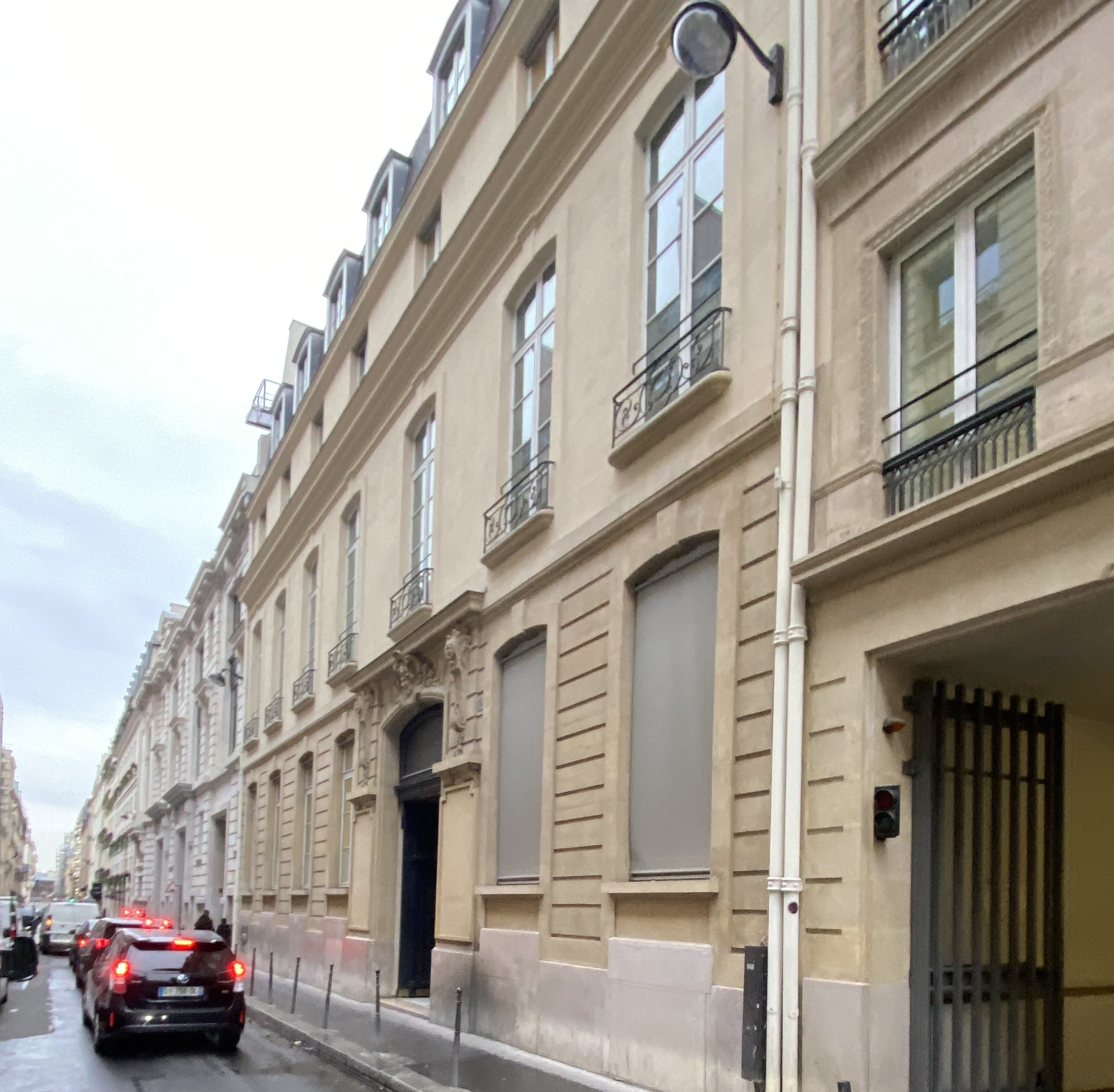
- Building at 43, rue Cambon in Paris, head office of the CFAA (1905-1909), CFAT (1909-1963) and SCDB (1963-1997)
- Industry: Financial services
- Founded: 1880
- Defunct: 1997
- Fate: Absorbed
- Successor: Société Générale
- Headquarters: Paris, France
- Area served: Algeria, Greece, Morocco, Spain, France, Gibraltar, the Kingdom of Italy, and Tunisia
- Products: Banking services

The Crédit Foncier d'Algérie et de Tunisie (CFAT (French pronunciation: [kʁedi fɔ̃sje dalʒeʁi e də tynizi], lit. 'Land Credit [Bank] of Algeria and Tunisia') was a French colonial bank.

It was originally founded in 1880 as the Crédit Foncier et Agricole d'Algérie (CFAA), lit. 'Land and Agricultural Credit [Bank] of Algeria'), an Algerian affiliate of Crédit Foncier de France, and took its name CFAT in 1909 following expansion to Tunisia.

In 1963, following Algerian independence, it renamed itself as Société Centrale de Banque (SCDB). It was acquired by Société Générale in 1971 and eventually absorbed by it in 1997. Its former overseas operations have become part of Banque Nationale d'Algérie in Algeria, Amen Bank in Tunisia, Société Générale in Morocco, and Fransabank in Lebanon.

== History ==
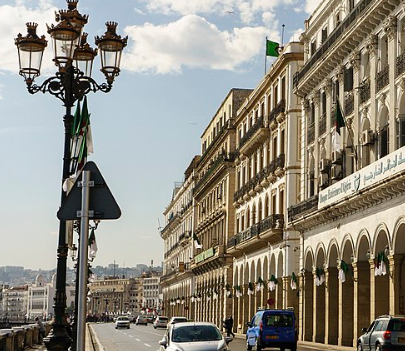
Building at 8, in the formerly boulevard de la République) in Algiers (center), Algerian head office of the CFAA/CFAT from 1886 to 1966 and later head office of the Banque Nationale d'Algérie

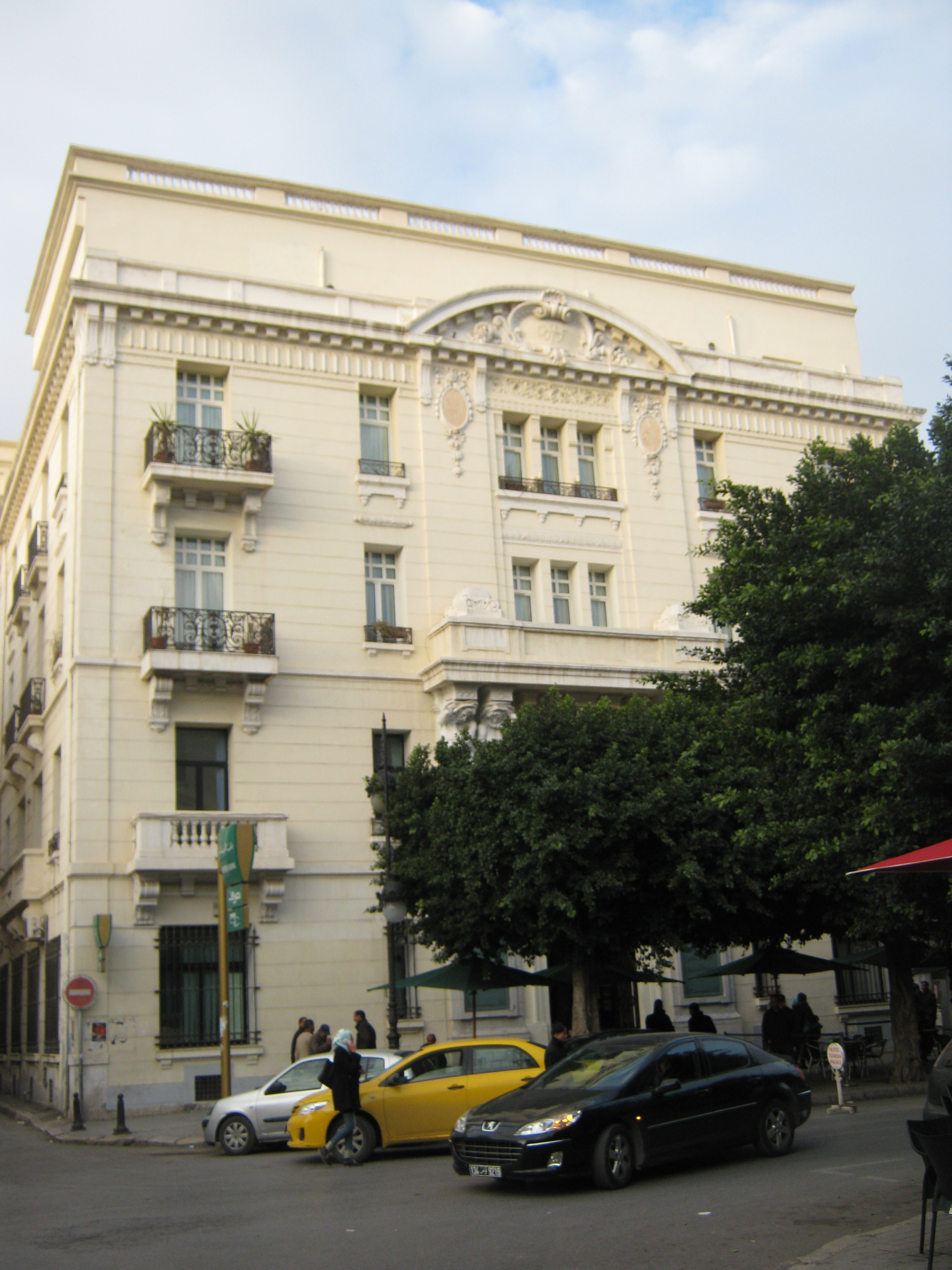
Building at 13, Avenue de France in Tunis, local head office of CFAT inaugurated 1912; lately Tunisia Palace Hotel

=== Colonial era ===
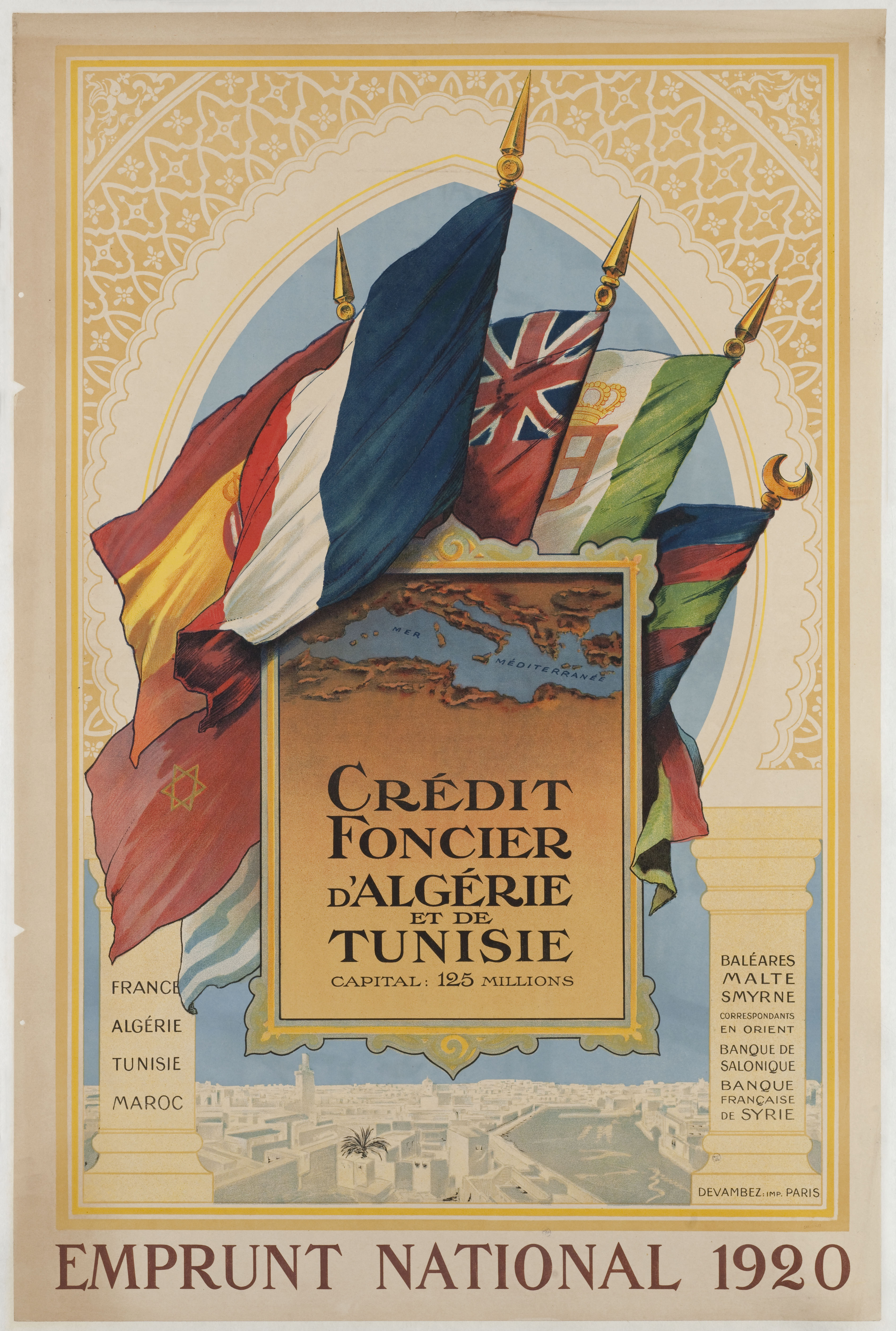
Post-World War I poster of CFAT featuring the flags (counterclockwise) of the Kingdom of Greece, Morocco, Kingdom of Spain, France, Gibraltar, the Kingdom of Italy, and Tunisia represented by the ensign of the Husainid dynasty

Paris-based Crédit Foncier de France was allowed in 1860 to expand its agricultural mortgage operations into French Algeria, but did not follow suit aggressively because of the already established Société Générale Algérienne (SCA), chaired by the Crédit Foncier's Governor Louis Frémy. In 1880, following the SCA's collapse and Frémy's dismissal in 1877, the Crédit Foncier created an affiliate bank in French Algeria, branded the Crédit Foncier et Agricole d'Algérie (CFAA). The governance of the CFAA initially included two board committees, one in Paris representing the shareholders and the other in Algiers, closer to the business. On 1 January 1881, the new bank took over the small Algerian loan portfolio developed by Crédit Foncier de France since 1860, and its operations started on 15 March 1881. A governance reshuffle in 1888 repatriated the main locus of decision-making from Algiers to Paris. Even though the Crédit Foncier de France did not hold significant equity in the CFAA, it practically controlled it and was its main source of funding in the early years.

The Parisian office of the CFAA was initially located at 21, rue des Capucines, then in 1896 at 4, rue Mogador, and from 1905 at 43, rue Cambon, where the bank would remain for many decades. It expanded into the nearby 45, rue Cambon in 1912. In Algiers, the bank purchased a waterfront lot in 1881, on the location of a demolished synagogue. It moved into the new building erected there in November 1886. By 1914, the bank had 2 additional offices in Algiers and 51 in the rest of Algeria.

Simultaneously as it broadened the range of its operations in Algeria, the CFAA expanded eastwards and westwards. In 1894, it opened a branch in Tunis, followed by Bizerte and Sousse in 1900. In 1904, the CFAA opened a branch in Tangier, by then the hub of foreign finance in Morocco. In 1909, it absorbed its small peer the Crédit Foncier de Tunisie, which had been created in 1906 by the Paris-based Crédit Mobilier Français, and rebranded itself as Crédit Foncier d'Algérie et de Tunisie (CFAT). In 1910 it opened a branch in Casablanca, for which it soon erected a grand building at 3, rue de Marseille (later avenue Lalla Yacout; demolished after World War II). In 1920, its role as local arm of the Crédit Foncier de France was formally extended to Morocco, by then a French protectorate.

The bank also opened branches in France outside Paris, in Marseille (1899), Nantes (1914) and Lyon (1921), as well as in London, Málaga, Palma de Mallorca, Gibraltar and Valletta in 1920. That same year, it surpassed its main Algerian competitor, the Compagnie Algérienne (successor of the SCA); by 1929 it was the largest French colonial bank and ninth-largest French bank by total deposits, behind the Société Générale, Crédit Lyonnais, Comptoir National d'Escompte de Paris, Banque Nationale de Crédit, Crédit Industriel et Commercial, Banque de Paris et des Pays-Bas, Crédit Commercial de France, and Crédit du Nord.

In 1919, the CFAT initiated an expansion into the Eastern Mediterranean region. It opened a branch in Smyrna, which it closed in 1920. In October 1919, it acquired a controlling stake in the Banque de Salonique from Société Générale, which it expanded to majority control in the 1920s. In 1920, the CFAT participated in the transaction that gave the Banque de Paris et des Pays-Bas control of the Imperial Ottoman Bank, and secured a management mandate over the Crédit Foncier de Syrie, which it held until 1929. In 1921, the CFAT opened a branch in Beirut.

=== Decolonization ===
During World War II, the CFAT's Parisian head office was cut off from its branches in London and Malta in 1940, from its operations in the Levant in 1941, and from its main North African business in late 1942, until the Liberation of Paris in 1944. Following the independence of Lebanon and Syria during World War II, the CFAT kept its branches there (in Beirut, Tripoli, Damascus, and Aleppo), complemented with new openings in Latakia (1951) and Zahlé (1955). In 1952, it also opened a branch in Tripoli in Libya. In 1947, however, the CFAT sold the Banque de Salonique's Greek operations, which had been severely damaged during World War II, to the Greek-owned Bank of Chios. In 1960, the CFAT created a subsidiary in Damascus, the Banque de l'Orient arabe, which took over its Syrian operations, and soon sold part of its equity to local interests; its residual 30 percent stake was nationalized in 1968.

In 1953, the Banque de l'Indochine took a stake in the CFAT, whose equity ownership had previously been dispersed, and entered its board. Separately, in 1954, the CFAT had for the first time a Muslim board member, Elhadj Zouai, followed by Mohammed Hadj-Sadok in 1961. In 1960, the CFAT acquired the Crédit Foncier de Monaco, the leading deposit-taking institution in Monaco.

In 1959-1961, the CFAT sold much of its Tunisian network to the newly established state-owned Banque Nationale Agricole, and only kept its main urban locations in Tunis, Sfax, and Sousse. In 1961, the CFAT's head office was relocated from Algiers to Paris. In 1963, it was rebranded the Société Centrale de Banque (SCDB), while a newly formed Algerian joint-stock company, itself named the Crédit Foncier d'Algérie et de Tunisie, took over the Algerian and Tunisian operations, and the Moroccan operations were transferred to a new Moroccan joint-stock company, the Société de Banque du Maghreb. Between 1962 and 1965, the CFAT closed more than half of its branches in Algeria. In 1964, the branch in Tripoli was subsidiarized as Société Africaine de Banque en Libye.

In the late 1960s, the SCDB lost what remained of its former core North African operations. In 1966 the Algerian CFAT, by then the country's largest banking network with 60 local offices, was acquired by a newly formed state-owned entity, the Banque Nationale d'Algérie; the handover ceremony was attended by Algerian president Houari Boumédiène. In 1967, the SCDB transferred its remaining Tunisian operations to a separate subsidiary with a new brand identity, the Crédit Foncier et Commercial de Tunisie (CFCT). The CFCT was led by a Tunisian, Ismail Zouiten, from 1968, and eventually acquired by the Tunisian Banque Générale d'Investissement in 1970; it was later rebranded as Amen Bank in 1995. Also in 1970, the Société Africaine de Banque en Libye was nationalized by Muammar Gaddafi's government.

=== Later developments ===
By 1968, the SCDB's main shareholders were the Banque de l'Indochine (21.5 percent), the Banque Française pour le Commerce (10 percent), and the Crédit Foncier de France (10 percent). The next year, the SCDB initiated talks aiming at consolidation within Société Générale, and sold its majority control of Banque de Salonique, which still had operations in Turkey, to Yapı Kredi. In 1970, its London branch was taken over by the Banque de l'Indochine.

In 1971, the SCDB's acquisition by Société Générale was completed, while the Banque de l'Indochine took over the Crédit Foncier de Monaco. The Banque Française pour le Moyen-Orient (BFMO) was formed from the SCDB's Lebanese operations and subsequently controlled by the Banque de l'Indochine, then rebranded Fransabank in 1982. The Société de Banque du Maghreb sold part of its network to Société Générale Morocco, after which the residual operations were acquired by Banque Marocaine du Commerce Extérieur. From then on, the SCDB focused entirely on its French operations, which partly served the community of individuals repatriated from French North Africa in the 1960s, through a network that reached 72 branches in the 1970s.

In 1986, the SCDB was further downsized. In 1997, its brand was discontinued, and it was fully absorbed by Société Générale.

== Leadership ==
- René Brice, 1880-1890
- Félix Thoureau, 1890-1894
- Hippolyte Suquet, 1894-1899
- Sébastien de Neufville, 1899-1902
- André Lebon, 1902-1937
- Xavier Loisy, 1937-1944
- Louis Renaudin, 1944-1961
- Gonzague de Lavernette, 1961-1971
- Jean Galibert, 1971-1973
- Charles Frappart, 1973-1980
- Edmond de Lavalette; 1980-1982
- Dominique Saglio, 1982-1984
- Yann Gaillard, 1984-1987
- Pierre Pichot, 1987-1996

== See also ==
- Compagnie Algérienne
- Banque de Tunisie
- List of banks in France
