= List of banks in Tunisia =

This is a list of commercial banks in Tunisia, as updated late 2024 by the Central Bank of Tunisia.

== List of commercial banks ==
- Tunis International Bank
- Tunisian Foreign Bank
- North Africa International Bank
- Wifak International Bank (WIB)
- Al Baraka Bank Tunisia, part of Al Baraka Group
- Banque Zitouna (BZ)
- Banque de Financement des Petites et Moyennes Entreprises (BFPME)
- Banque Tuniso-Libyenne (BTL)
- Banque de Tunisie et des Emirats (BTE)
- Qatar National Bank Tunisia (QNB), part of QNB Group
- Tunisian Saudi Bank (TSB)
- Banque Tuniso-Koweitienne (BTK)
- Bank ABC
- Citibank Tunisie
- BH Bank
- Union Internationale de Banques (UIB)
- Union Bancaire pour le Commerce et l'Industrie (UBCI)
- Société Tunisienne de Banque (STB)
- Banque Internationale Arabe de Tunisie (BIAT)
- Amen Bank (AB)
- Banque Tunisienne de Solidarité (BTS)
- Banque de Tunisie (BT)
- Attijari Bank, part of Attijariwafa Bank Group
- Banque Nationale Agricole
- Arab Tunisian Bank (ATB)
- Offshore branch of Citibank

== See also ==
- Economy of Tunisia
- List of companies based in Tunisia
- List of banks in the Arab world
- List of banks in Africa
