= Bourse de Tunis =

Stock exchange based in Tunis

Tunis Stock Exchange
- Type: Stock exchange
- Location: Tunis, Tunisia
- Founded: 1969
- Key people: Mourad Ben Chaabane (President)
- No. of listings: 74
- Market cap: US$ 10 billion
- Indices: Tunindex
- Website: www.bvmt.com.tn

The Bourse des Valeurs Mobilières de Tunis (BVMT) or Bourse de Tunis (Arabic: بورصة تونس) is a stock exchange based in Tunis, Tunisia. It was founded in 1969, and currently lists around 50 stocks.

The exchange is under the control of the state-run Financial Market Council. The government has provided tax breaks to increase the number of listings, but companies have been slow in going public. The creation of the award was in February 1969. Although this creation is relatively old, the role of the stock market in financing Tunisia's economy has remained limited or insignificant due to the dominance of the state and banks . This results in significant levels of money creation and inflation.

This period is characterized by ease of access to bank loans and state aid, a very advantageous remuneration of deposits with banks that are regulated, protected and exempt income and a fairly heavy taxation of stock market investments.

The award will be increasingly seen as a registrar of transactions as a mirror of the economy having its place in the corporate finance. Moreover, the market capitalization represents just 1% of GDP at the end of 1986.

As part of the structural adjustment plan, a financial market reform started in 1988 with the aim of establishing a legal framework allowing the market to contribute to the financing of the economy. Deposits with banks are taxed, the rates of interest on deposits are falling as a result of lower inflation and savings in securities enjoys favorable taxation with the abolition of taxation on most -values and dividends. The tax on corporate profits also down 80% to 35%. To meet international standards, reform is adopted with the promulgation of the Law of 14 November 1994 on the reorganization of financial market. This law creates the new public regulator: the Financial Market Council, which began operations on 15 November 1995. Following this major reform of the Tunis Stock Exchange that establishes the foundations of a financial market, potentially able to finance part of the economy, the situation continues to evolve fifty companies listed in March 2009, for a market capitalization of up to 8.7 billion dinars (against 3.1 billion in 2004) or 16% of national GDP.

== Listed companies ==
=== Financials ===
- Amen Bank
- Arab Tunisian Bank
- Banque Attijari de Tunisie
- Banque de l'Habitat
- Banque Internationale Arabe de Tunisie
- Banque Nationale Agricole
- Banque de Tunisie
- Société Tunisienne de Banque
- Banque de Tunisie et des Emirats
- Union Bancaire pour le Commerce et l'Industrie
- Union Internationale de Banques

=== Financial services ===
- Arab Tunisian Lease
- Attijari Leasing
- Compagnie Internationale de Leasing
- El Wifack Leasing
- Tunisie Leasing
- Placements de Tunisie - SICAF
- Société de Placement et de Développement Industriel et Touristique - SICAF
- Société Tunisienne d'Investissement à Capital Risqué
- Poulina Group Holding
- Modern Leasing

=== Insurance ===
- Assurances Maghrebia
- Assurances Maghrebia vie
- Astree
- BH Assurance
- BNA Assurances
- Société tunisienne d'assurances et de réassurance (STAR)
- Tunis Re

=== Telecommunication ===
- Société Tunisienne d'Entreprises de Telecommunications
- Servicom

=== General retailers ===
- Automobile Réseau Tunisien et Services
- Magasin Général
- Société Nouvelle Maison de la Ville de Tunis
- Société Tunisienne des Marchés de Gros
- Ennalk Automobiles

=== Travel and leisure ===
- Société Tunisienne de l'Air

=== Healthcare ===
- Société Adwya
- Société des Industries Pharmaceutiques de Tunisie

=== Consumer goods ===
- Société l'Accumulateur Tunisien
- Société Générale Industrielle de Filtration
- Société Tunisienne d'Equipement
- Société Tunisienne des Industries de Pneumatiques

=== Food and Beverage ===
- Société Frigorifique et Brasserie de Tunis
- Tunisie Lait
- Société de Production Agricole de Teboulba

=== Personal and household goods ===
- Electrostar

=== Construction and materials ===
- Essoukna
- Société Immobilière et de Participation
- Société Immobilière Tuniso-Séoudienne
- Société Moderne de Céramique
- Les Ciments de Bizerte
- Carthage Cement

=== Industrial goods and services ===
- Société Industrielle d'Appareillage et de Matériels Electriques
- Société Tunisienne de Verreries
- One Tech Holding

=== Chemicals ===
- Air Liquide Tunisie
- Société Chimique
- Société des Industries Chimiques du Fluor

=== Basic resources ===
- Société Tunisie Profiles Aluminium

=== Oil and gas ===
- Société de Transport des Hydrocarbures Par Pipelines

== See also ==
- List of African stock exchanges
- List of stock exchanges
