= Marcel Prévost =

French novelist and dramatist (1862–1941)

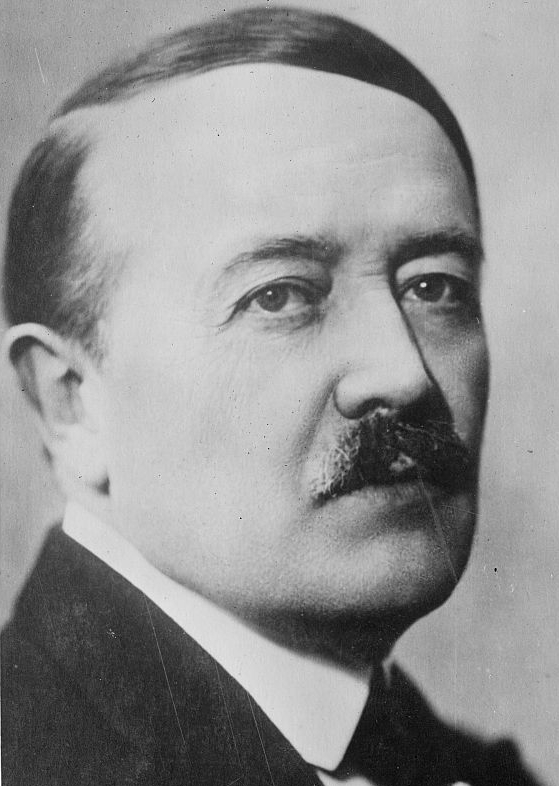
- Born: 1 May 1862; Paris, France
- Died: 8 April 1941 (aged 78)
- Education: École polytechnique
- Occupations: Novelist and dramatist
- Writing career
- Period: 1881–1941
- Notable awards: Académie Française (1909); Grand Cross of the Legion of Honor (1935)

Marcel Prévost (French: [maʁsɛl pʁevo]; 1 May 1862 – 8 April 1941) was a French novelist and dramatist. He was a member of the Académie Française and a recipient of the Grand Cross of the Legion of Honor.

== Early life and education ==
Prévost was born in Paris on 1 May 1862, and educated at Jesuit schools in Bordeaux and Paris, entering the École polytechnique in 1882. He published a story in Le Clairon as early as 1881, but for some years after the completion of his studies he worked as an engineer in the manufacture of tobacco.

== Career ==
After taking a position as a government minister, Prévost published in succession the novels Le Scorpion (1887), Chonchette (1888), Mademoiselle Jaufre (1889), Cousine Laura (1890), La Confession d'un amant (1891), Lettres de femmes (1892), L'Automne d'une femme (1893), and in 1894 he made a great sensation by a study of the results of Parisian education and Parisian society on young girls, Les Demi-vierges, which was dramatized and produced with great success at the Gymnase on 21 May 1895.

Le Jardin secret appeared in 1897; and in 1900 Les Vierges fortes, and a study of the question of women's education and independence in two novels Frédérique and Léa. He continued with L'Heureux ménage (1901), Les Lettres à Françoise (1902), La Princesse d'Erminge (1904), and L'Accordeur aveugle (1905). A picture of modern German manners is given in his Monsieur et Madame Moloch (1906). He had a great success in 1904 with a four-act play La Plus faible, produced at the Comédie-Française, for which he won the 1905 Prix Toirac.

Prévost was elected to the Académie française on 27 May 1909, taking the seat of Victorien Sardou; he was welcomed to the Académie by Paul Hervieu.

His later novels included Féminités (1912), Les Don Juanes (1922), and La Mort des Ormeaux (1938). He directed the Revue de France 1922–1940 and chaired the Société des gens de lettres. In 1935, he was awarded the Grand Cross of the Legion of Honor.

== Death ==
Prévost died on 8 April 1941, aged 78.
