= Tunisian Saudi Bank =

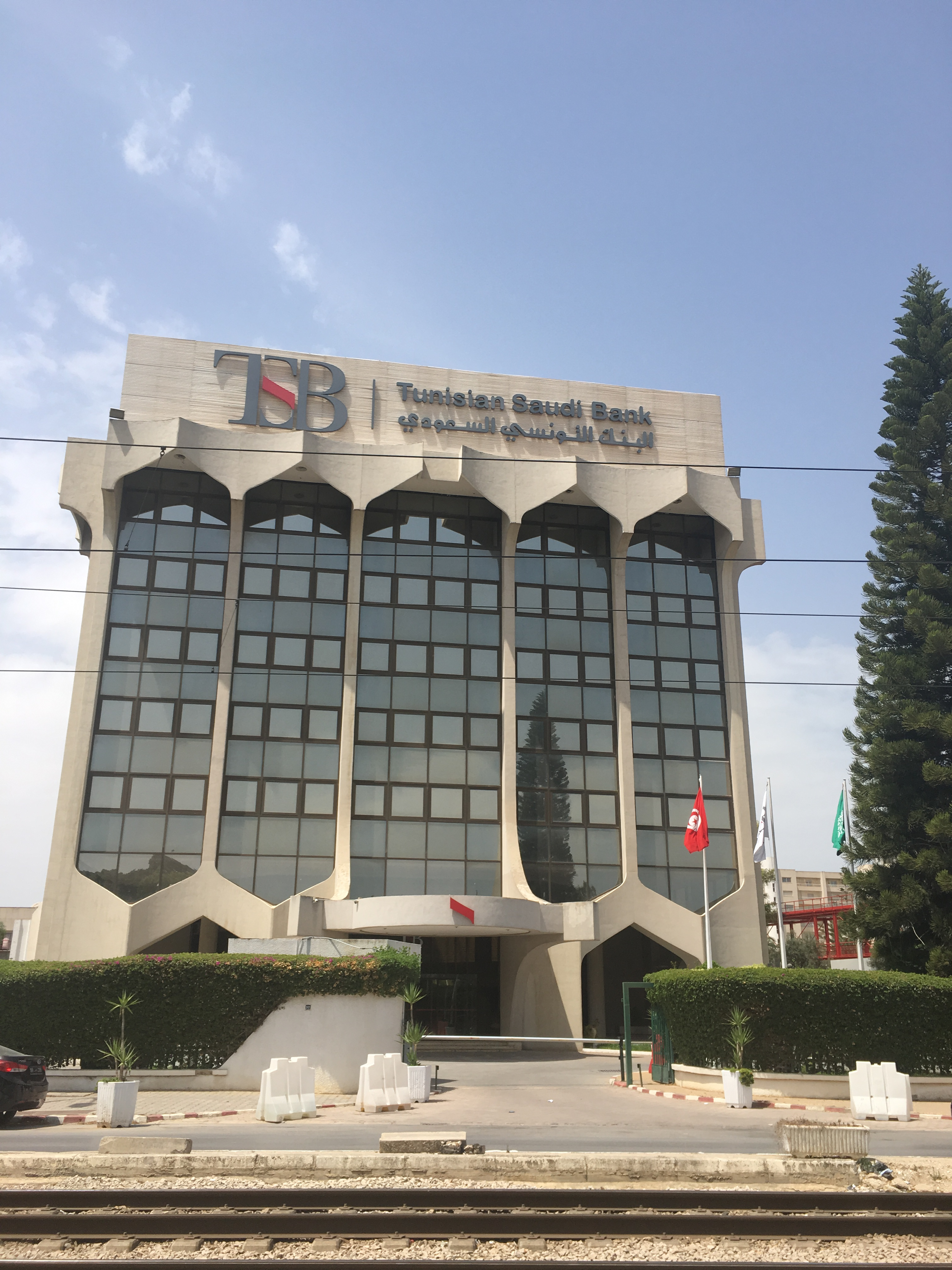
TSB headquarters, 2019.

Stusid Bank is a bank in Tunisia and Saudi Arabia.

== Overview ==
Société Tuniso-Saoudienne d'Investissement et de Développement was founded on May 30, 1981. It was the result of an agreement between the government of Tunisia and that of Saudi Arabia. It helped expand tourism in the Sahara, cattle farming and milk production. It also helped expand the region of Tabarka and the city of Sfax.

It has 100 million dinars split among Tunisia and Saudi Arabia in assets. Former Tunisian Minister of Agriculture Abdessalem Mansour worked for Stusid Bank from 1981 to 1999.

== See also ==
- List of banks in Tunisia
