= Amen Bank =

Tunisian bank

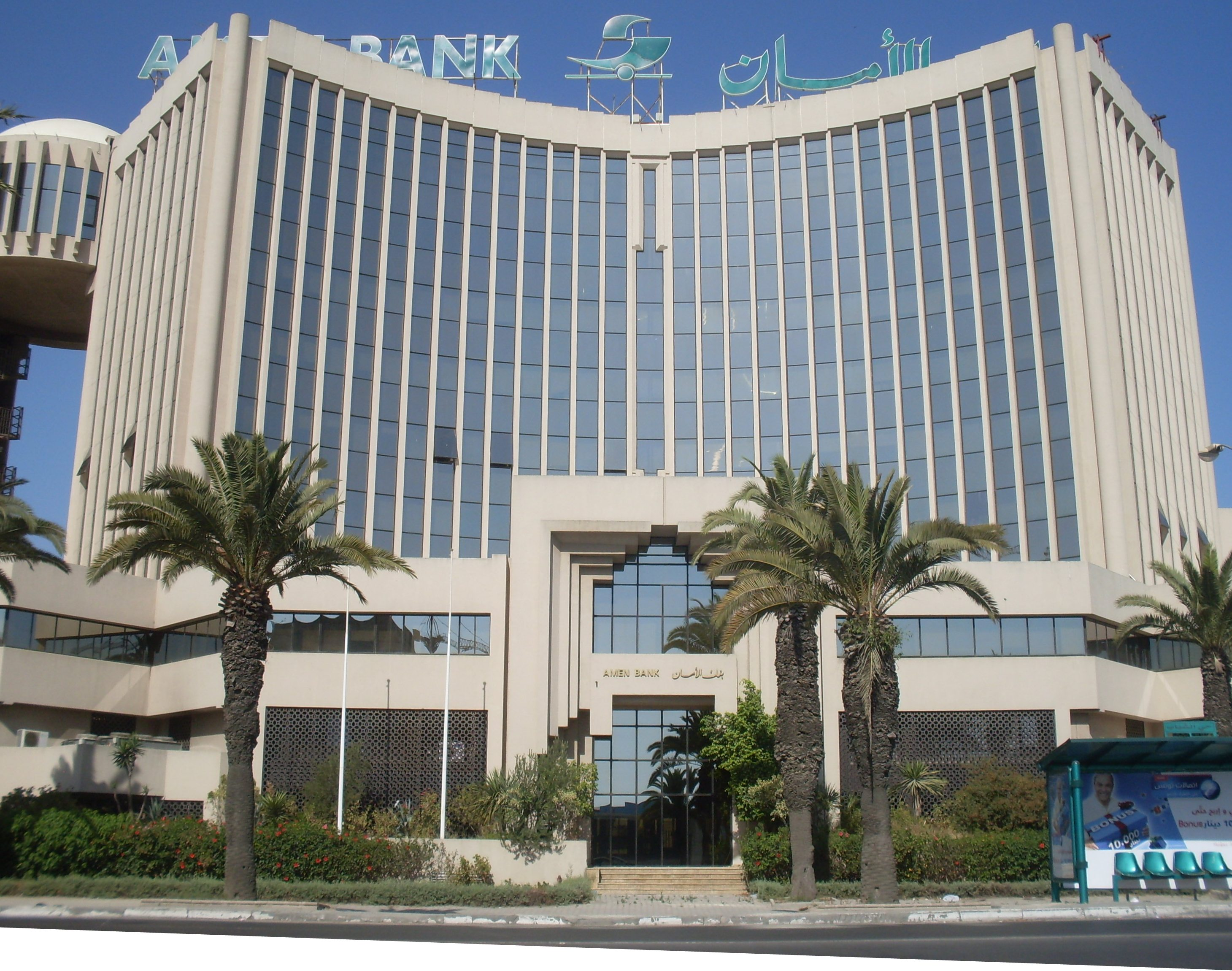
- Industry: Financial services
- Founded: 1966
- Headquarters: Tunis, Tunisia
- Services: Banking

Amen Bank is a private sector bank in Tunisia. It is listed in the Bourse de Tunis.

== Overview ==
Amen Bank traces its origins to the Crédit Foncier d'Algérie et de Tunisie (CFAT), a local branch of the French banking network Société Centrale de Banque, later associated with Société Générale. CFAT had been established in 1880 and was headquartered in Algiers, Algeria. Following Tunisian independence, the institution was reorganized in 1966 and adopted the name Crédit Foncier et Commercial de Tunisie (CFCT). Its first chief executive officer was Ismail Zouiten, although its shareholders at that time were French citizens.

In 1971, CFCT was acquired by Banque Générale d'Investissement, later known as PGI Holding. The change in ownership also brought Tunisian shareholders into the company, and Rachid Ben Yedder became its chief executive officer. The bank adopted its current name, Amen Bank, in 1995.

Amen Bank later developed digital banking services. In 2009, it launched what was described as Tunisia's first online banking service. In 2015, the bank introduced Amen First Bank, presented as the first online direct bank in Tunisia. The same year, Amen Bank submitted a request to the Central Bank of Tunisia to establish a subsidiary specializing in Islamic banking and finance.

The bank is headquartered in Tunis, Tunisia.

== See also ==
- List of banks
- List of banks in Tunisia
