= Abdessalem Mansour =

Tunisian politician (born 1949)

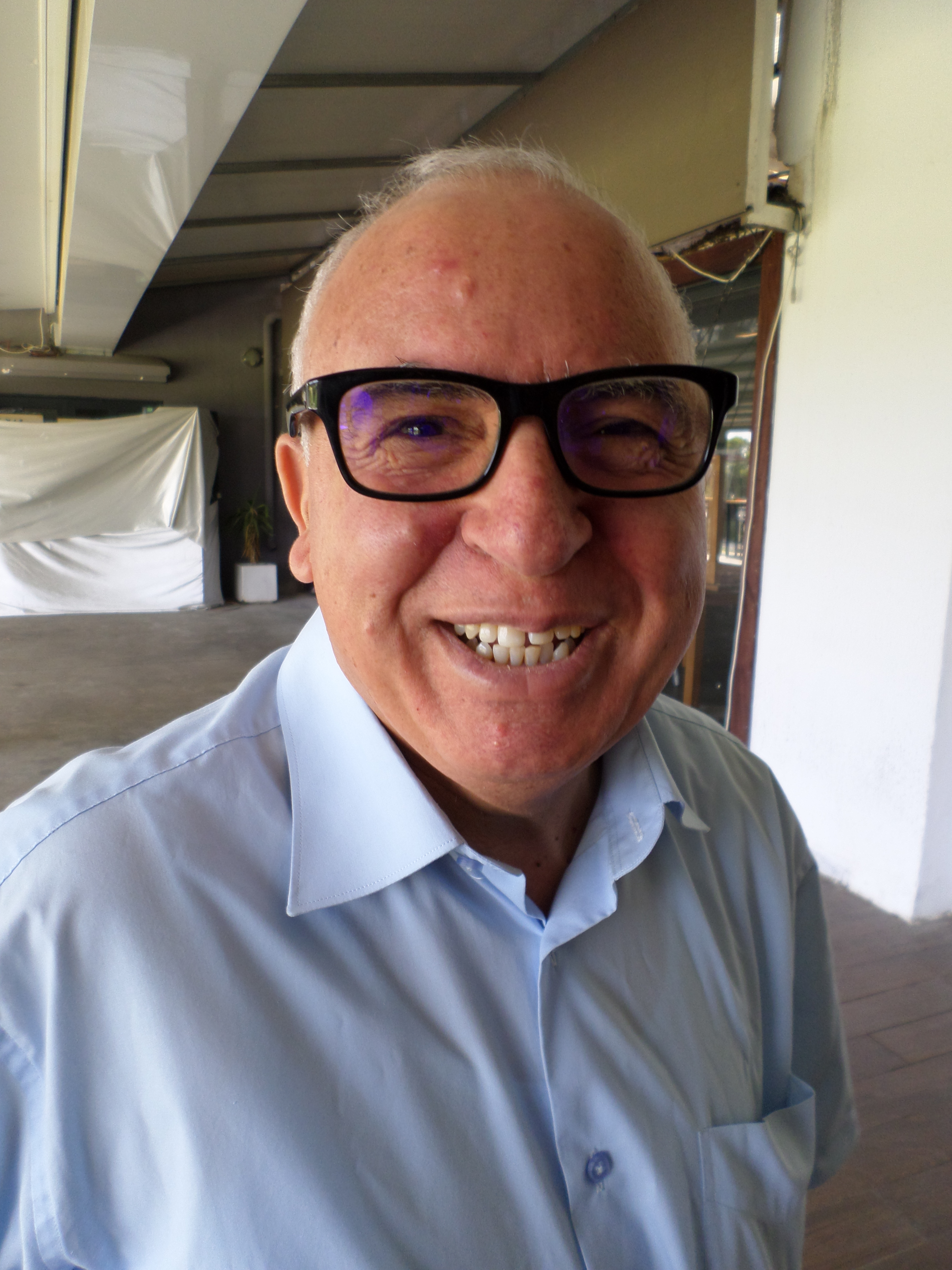
Abdessalem Mansour (1949- ), former Tunisian minister of agriculture

Abdessalem Mansour (born November 19, 1949) is a Tunisian politician. He was the Minister of Agriculture under former President Zine El Abidine Ben Ali.

Mansour was born in Sousse, Tunisia. He graduated from the University of Tunis in 1971, and received a Masters in Agricultural Economics from the University of Minnesota in 1974.

From 1974 to 1980, he worked for the Tunisian Ministry of Agriculture. He worked as an adviser for a Kuwaitian firm from 1980 to 1981. From 1981 to 1999, he worked for the Stusid Bank. In August 2008, he was appointed as Minister of Agriculture and Water Resources, until he was deposed in the aftermath of the 2010–2011 Tunisian protests.
