= Alfred Edwards (journalist) =

French journalist (1856–1914)

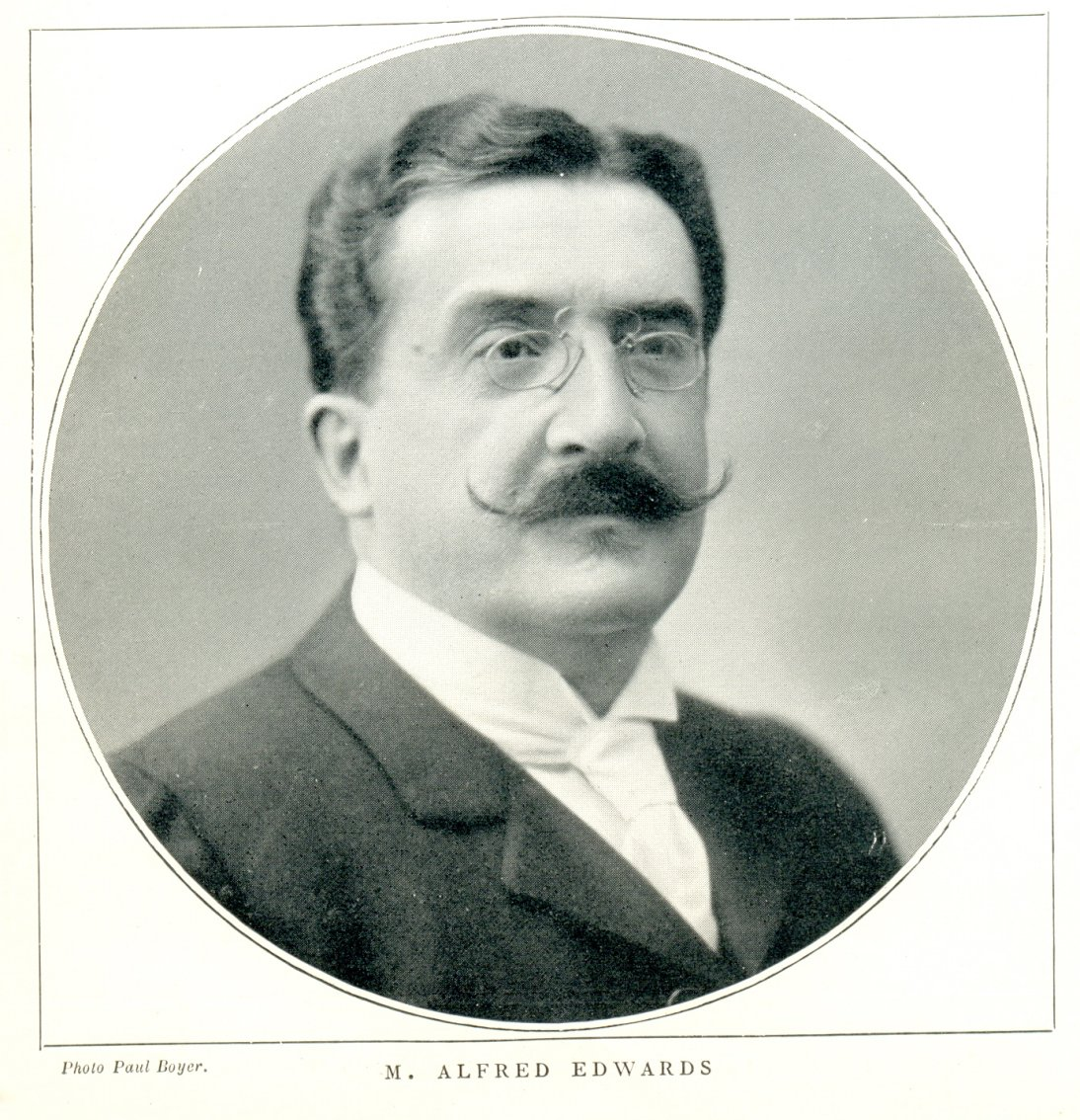
Alfred Edwards circa 1900

Alfred Charles Edwards (10 July 1856 – 10 March 1914) was a journalist and magnate of the French press.

== Life ==
Edwards was born in Constantinople, the son of Charles Edwards (an English doctor posted to the Orient, and the personal physician to Fuad Pacha in Cairo) and his French wife Emilie Caporal (from Montauban). Edwards studied in Paris before beginning his press career with Le Figaro in 1876. There he became known for his reports and, three years later, he moved to Le Gaulois as an editor, then becoming chief editor of 'échos' (short articles devoted to a famous figure or events in a famous figure's life). On both these papers he nurtured relationships and built up a valuable network of contacts. In 1881, he edited Le Clairon and married the sister of the famous doctor Jean-Martin Charcot, whose other daughter remarried to Pierre Waldeck-Rousseau, future president of the Conseil. Edwards was contacted a few months later by a group of American financiers, Chamberlain & Co, who asked him to take control of the creation of Le Matin, a French adaptation of the British daily newspaper The Morning News.

Le Matin 's first issue came out on 26 February 1884, but Edwards quickly became opposed to the financiers' aims for the paper and so decided to form his own newspaper, Le Matin (France). Three months later, Edwards' new paper was outselling Le Matin, and so he bought Le Matin from its owners and merged the two papers. Undertaking modernisation of the resulting paper, he began using modern technologies such as the telegraph and signing great writers such as Jules Vallès and the député Arthur Ranc.

Le Matin 's political line reflected Edwards' own convictions, which favoured moderate republicans and opposed Boulangisme and socialist ideas. The new press magnate mixed in the highest circles, obtaining the Légion d'honneur, but also with dubious politicians. He used his paper to support those circles and to defend those politicians, until his implication in the Panama scandals came to light. In 1895 he sold Le Matin to the banker Henri Poidatz and launched new projects, financing the illustrated journal Le Petit Bleu de Paris and creating Le Petit Sou for his own political ends.

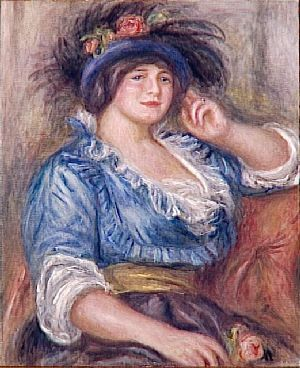
Jeune femme à la rose, by Auguste Renoir (1913), portraying Gabrielle Colonna-Romano

A millionaire personality known to all Paris, he bought Jean-Jacques Rousseau's hermitage at Montmorency as well as the Théâtre de Paris and its adjoining casino. He even wrote short comedies and operettas himself, such as Par Ricochet, presented at the Théâtre des Capucines in 1906, or other pieces intended for the Grand Guignol. He was also highly thought of among women of the time, marrying in succession Miss Drouart, Hélène Bailly, Jeanne Charcot and then, in 1905, Misia Godebska, the "queen of Paris".

He accepted an offer to run the conservative paper Le Soir in 1910, bought back in 1873 from the baron Georges de Soubeyran. In 1909, he had married his fifth wife, the actress Ginette Lantelme, who mysteriously fell from Edwards' yacht and drowned in a river cruise on the Rhine on 25 July 1911.

He died in March 1914 of a severe case of influenza.

== Sources and bibliography ==
- (in French) Michael Palmer, Des petits journaux aux grandes agences. Naissance du journalisme moderne, Aubier-Montaigne, 1983
- (in French) René Le Cholleux, Revue biographique des notabilités françaises contemporaines, tome 3, Paris, 1892, pp. 332–333
- (in French) Alex-Ceslas Rzewuski, La Double tragédie de Misia Sert, 2006, Editions du Cerf
- (in French) Biography of Alfred Edwards
- Article in the New York Times, 11 March 1914

== See also ==
- Le Matin (France)
