= Louis de Fourcaud =

French art critic and historian

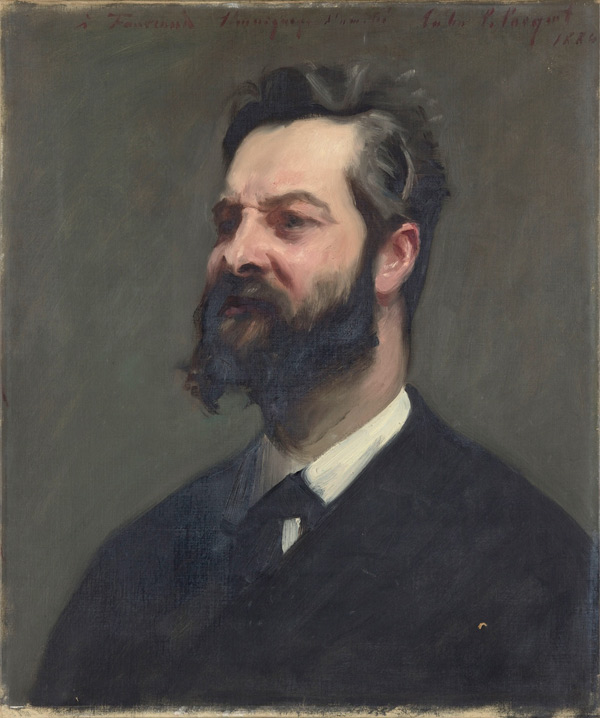
Louis de Fourcaud; portrait by John Singer Sargent (1884)

Louis Jean Olivier Marie de Boussès de Fourcaud (5 November 1851, Beaumarchés - 19 October 1914, Beaumarchés) was a French art critic and historian.

== Life and work ==
He began his studies at the Conservatoire de Paris, where he learned to play the cello. He was also a student of the historian Jules Quicherat, at the École Nationale des Chartes.

Soon after, he started writing a series of articles for magazines and professional journals. He used several pseudonyms, including "Lambert", "George", and "Junius". His colleagues dubbed him "Salonard" (snob, or fop); a name he officially adopted in 1877. He would provide art criticism to Le Gaulois for most of his life. After 1879, he was an independent contributor to La Revue wagnérienne and, later, was a staff member at Le Clairon, a short-lived pro-royalist newspaper.

In 1884, he wrote his first article for the Gazette des Beaux-Arts, about that year's Salon. He was named to the Conseil Supérieur des Beaux-Arts in 1891. Two years later, he became a professor of aesthetics at the École Nationale des Beaux-Arts. In 1913, not long before his death, he was elected to the Académie des Beaux-Arts, taking Seat# 8 in the "Unattached" section.

== Sources ==
- Timeline and critical assessment by Laure Schnapper, @ the Institut National d'Histoire de l'Art
- Biographical data and references @ AGORHA
- Biographical data from the Comité des travaux historiques et scientifiques @ La France Savante
