= Louis Frémy =

19th-century French politician and banker

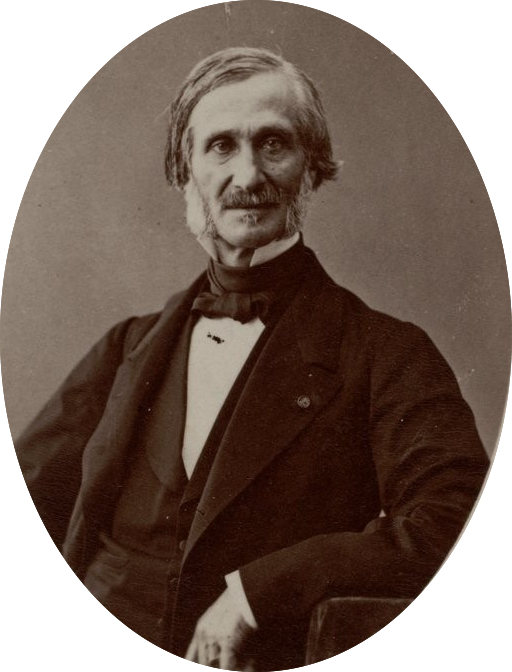
Louis Frémy

Louis Frémy (April 2, 1805, Saint-Fargeau - March 16, 1891, Paris) was a French civil servant, politician and banker.

== Early life and family ==
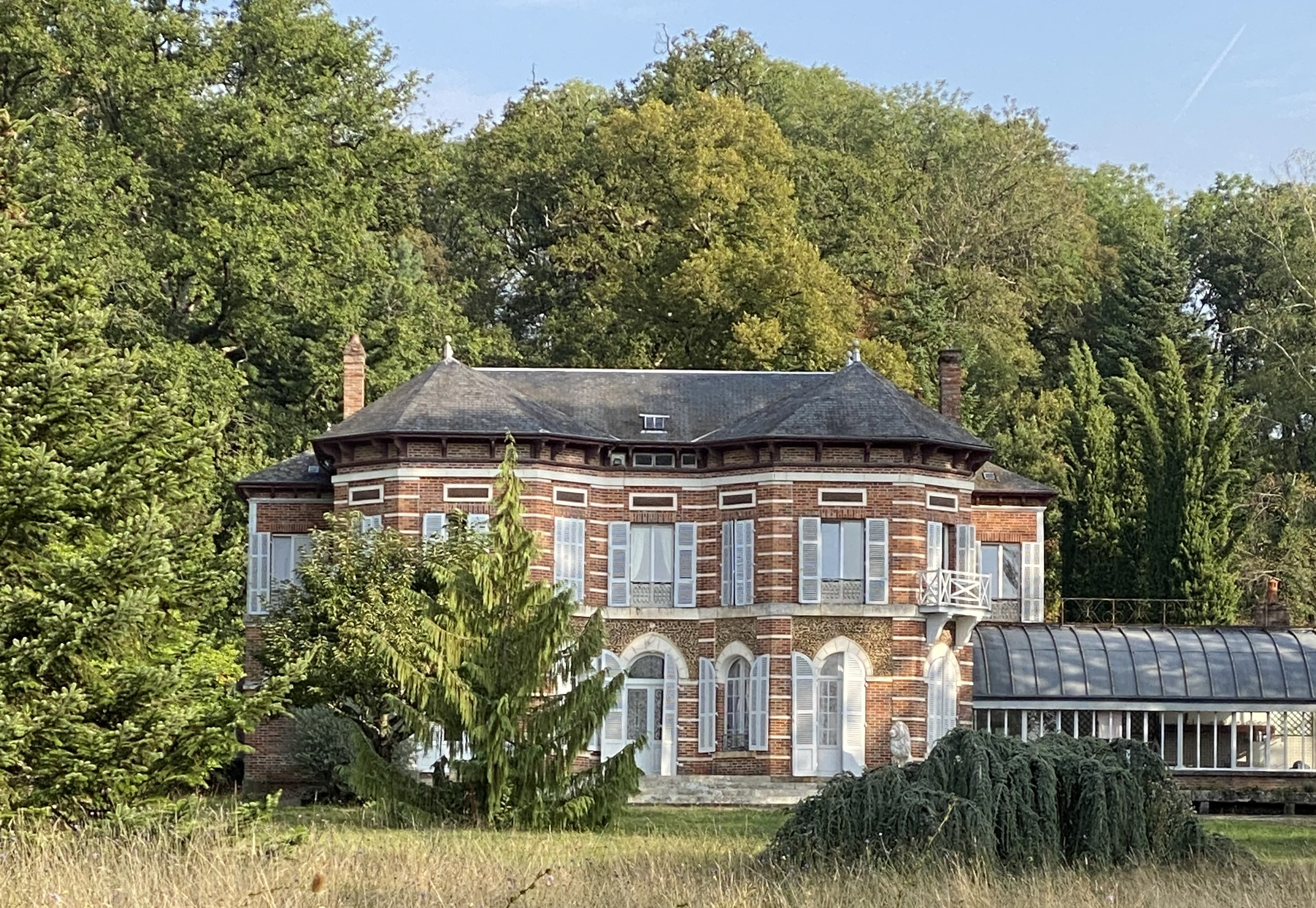
Château des Janets in Saint-Sauveur-en-Puisaye, Frémy's former mansion

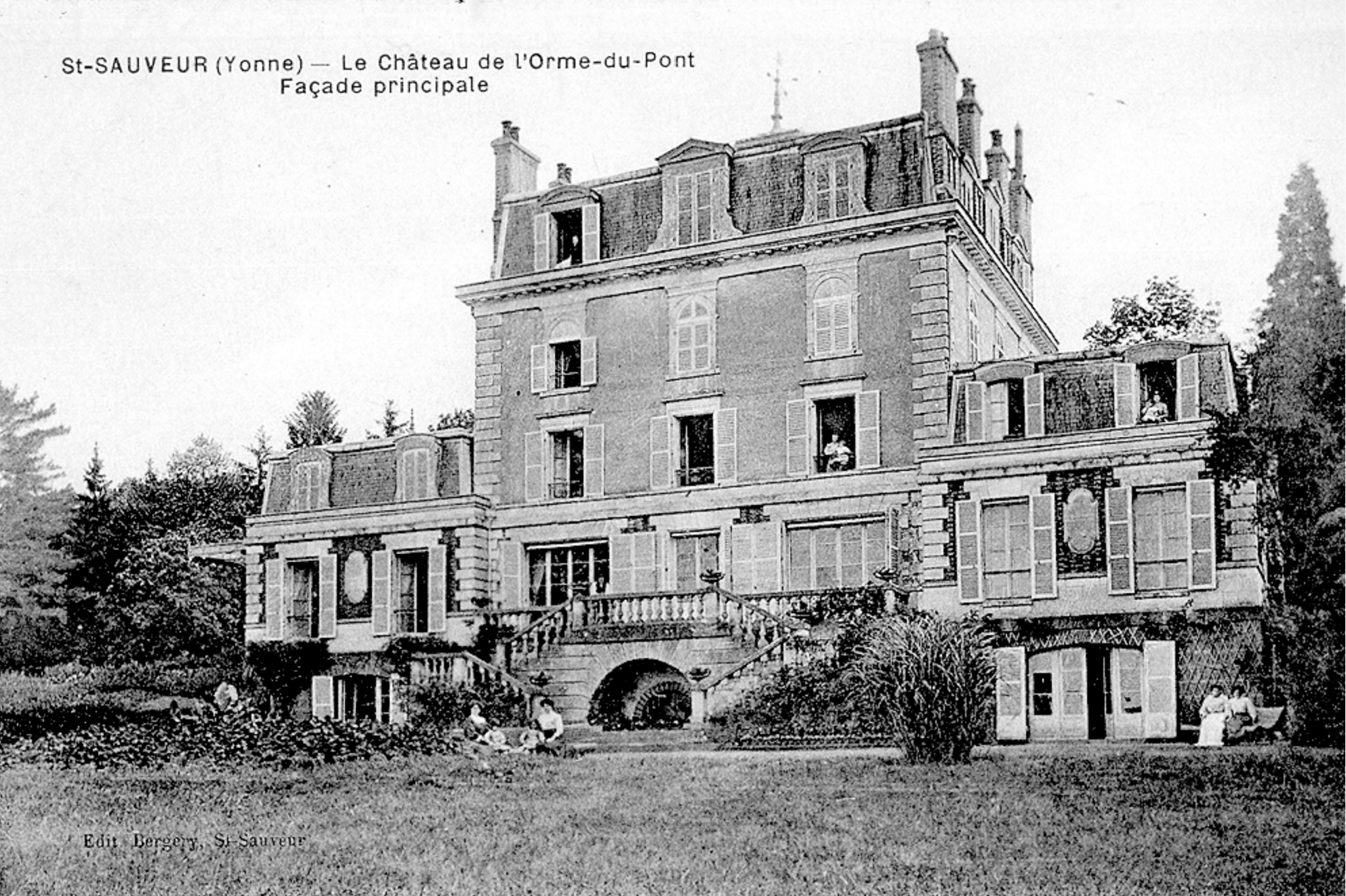
Frémy's former hilltop property at L'Orme-du-Pont near Saint-Sauveur-en-Puisaye, photographed in 1910

Frémy was born in Saint-Fargeau of Xavier Louis Maurice Frémy (1757-1807), who had been the town's mayor since October 1803, and Charlotte née Navier. His father died when he was only two years old and he was raised by his mother. He studied at the Collège Sainte-Barbe in Paris, then at the Faculty of Law and established himself as a lawyer in Paris in 1829. In 1837 he married Louise Alexandrine Delacour; they had a son, Paul, born in 1848.

In 1841, Frémy acquired a country house, the château des Janets outside Saint-Sauveur-en-Puisaye, a rural town near Saint-Fargeau. In 1844, he purchased a mansion at the nearby hamlet of L'Orme-du-Pont, in which he subsequently established a farming school that operated from 1847 to 1878. He also built a holiday villa on the Mont Boron in Nice.

== Official positions ==
In 1831, Frémy became mayor of Saint-Fargeau and conseiller d'arrondissement in Joigny from 1833 to 1836. By 1833, he was a master (French: auditeur) at the Conseil d'État. In 1835, he became subprefect of Domfront, then in 1837 of Gien.

In 1842, he joined the French railway commission (French: commission administrative des chemins de fer), and became its secretary-general in 1847. In 1848, he became chief of staff of Minister of the Interior Léon Faucher and conseiller général of the Yonne department, in which Saint-Fargeau is located. From 1849 to 1851 he was deputy of Yonne, sitting on the right together with the monarchists. In 1853, Jean Gilbert Victor Fialin, duc de Persigny appointed him head of personnel of the Interior Ministry.

In 1862 he was appointed vice-president of the Société du Prince Impérial by Empress Eugénie, whose personal finances he managed in that capacity. He was again deputy for Yonne from 1865 to 1869, sitting in the so-called dynastic majority supporting Napoleon III. He was a friend of Georges-Eugène Haussmann and a stalwart support of the Second Empire regime.

== Banking career ==
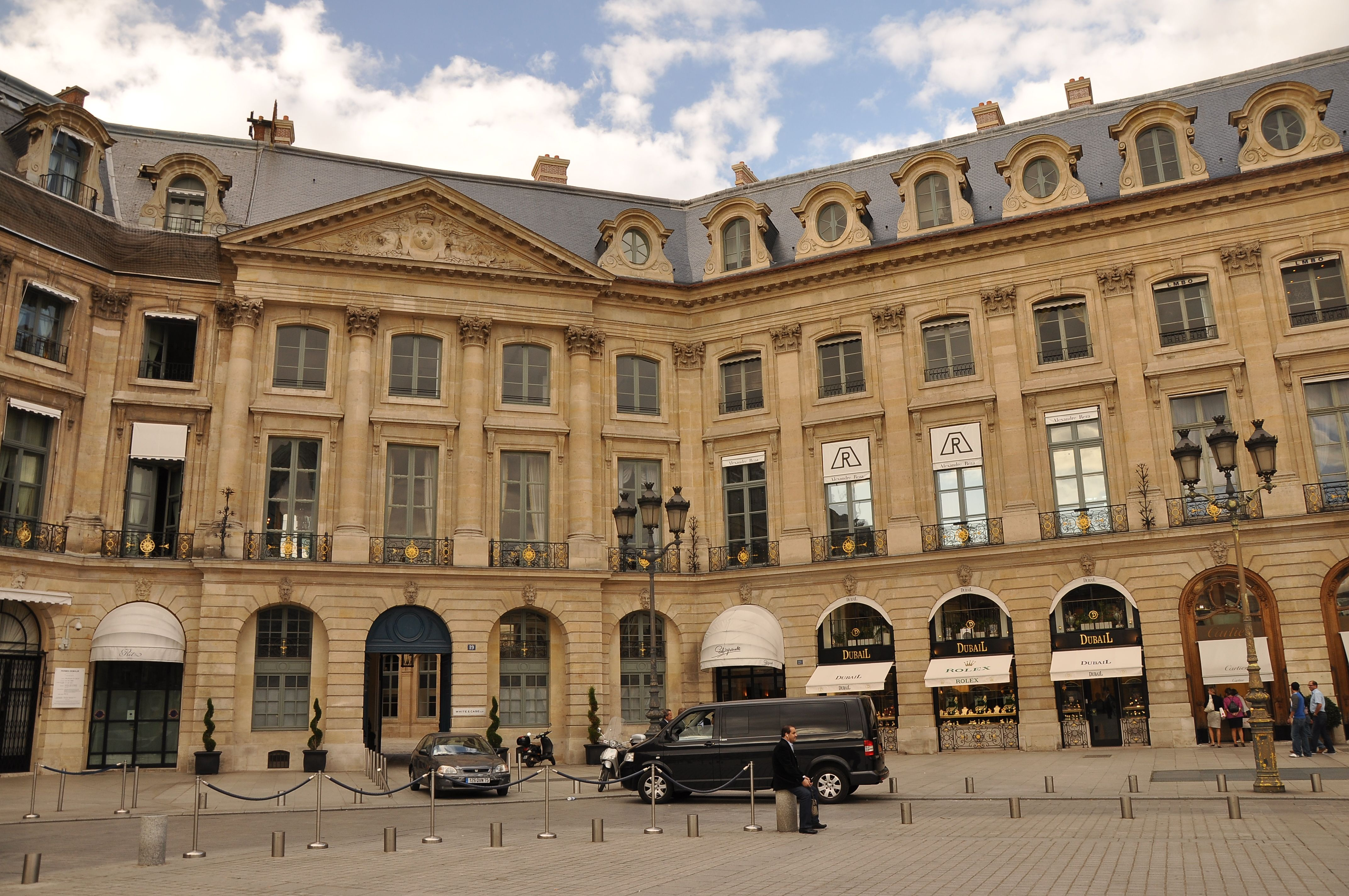
Hôtel d'Évreux on Place Vendôme, Frémy's Parisian base from 1862 to 1877

On 3 July 1857, Frémy became the chief executive (known as Governor) of the Crédit Foncier, succeeding Charles Le Bègue de Germiny. In the late 1850s and early 1860s he provided large-scale lending to the Pereire brothers' Compagnie immobilière.

In 1860-1861 he led the Crédit Foncier's expansion into agricultural lending, branded Crédit Agricole, which however faltered in the late 1870s and is thus not a direct predecessor of the later Crédit Agricole. In 1861, he was a member of the committee appointed to resolve the conflict between the Bank of France and Bank of Savoy. In 1863, he secured a third of the equity of Vienna's Allgemeine Bodencreditanstalt (French: Crédit foncier autrichien) for the shareholders of Crédit Foncier as well as himself and his deputy Georges de Soubeyran. Similar mortgage banks supported by Frémy were founded in 1867 in the United States and Prussia, and in 1873 in Spain.

In 1862, the Crédit Foncier acquired the storied Hôtel d'Évreux on Place Vendôme, from which Frémy played a central role in the Parisian financial and business community.

In 1865-1866 Frémy was among the cofounders of Société Générale Algérienne, of which he became chairman. By the 1870s, he was also chairman of the société des mines de Soumah et Tafna in French Algeria.

In January 1877, under the new regime of the French Third Republic, he was dismissed from his position at the Crédit Foncier at the instigation of Finance Minister Léon Say on the pretext of his investments in Egypt; Soubeyran was subsequently ousted in August 1878. Frémy remained a board member at the Austrian Bodencreditanstalt until his death. By the end of his life he had ostensibly lost his fortune, and had to sell the mansions at Les Janets and L'Orme-du-Pont in 1884 and 1889 respectively, even though in 1887 he still kept the villa on the Côte d'Azur.

== Honors ==
On 5 July 1863 he was made a Grand officier of the Legion of Honour. He was also awarded the Grand Cross of Spain's Order of Isabella the Catholic, First Class Iron Cross of Austria-Hungary's Cross of Merit, first class in the Ottoman Empire's Order of the Medjidie, and the cross of Italy's Order of Saints Maurice and Lazarus.

== In popular culture ==
Frémy was the model for the character of Toutain-Laroche in Émile Zola's 1872 novel La Curée.

== See also ==
- Armand Donon
- Pereire brothers
- Georges de Soubeyran
