= Jean-Marie Georges Girard de Soubeyran =

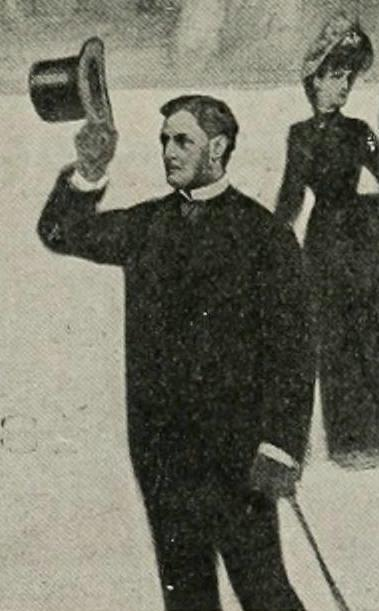
Jean-Marie Georges Girard de Soubeyran depicted in Panorama Le "Tout-Paris" by Charles Castellani (detail)

Jean-Marie Georges Girard, baron de Soubeyran (3 November 1828, Paris - 2 February 1897, Paris), was a French politician and administrator.

== Life ==
The son of the financial receiver-general (receveur général des finances) at Nancy and (through his mother) the grandson of Savary, duc de Rovigo, he studied law before rejoining the ministère des Finances in 1849. In 1853, he was made a knight of the Légion d'honneur, and the following year he became head of personnel and head of the ministère d’État.

Raised to the rank of officer of the Légion d’honneur, he was made deputy governor of the Crédit Foncier de France in 1860 and was the same year elected mayor of Morthemer after having tried out politics as conseiller général of the canton of Saint-Julien-l'Ars (1855–1892).

On 14 October 1864, he married Marie-Marguerite Beaupoil de Saint-Aulaire. Between 1863 and 1893, he was, without a break, elected deputé of Vienne. At the National Assembly, he supported Adolphe Thiers and sat with the conservative right. He also participated in the National Assembly's budget commission. Well known for his financial talents, it was his advice that Léon Gambetta sought upon being elected president of the budget commission in 1876.

A member of the centre-right, he voted against the Franco-Prussian War of 1870 and stood aside at the fall of the Second Empire. He bought the daily newspaper Le Soir (founded in 1869 by the banker Merton) in 1873 and imposed a more conservative editorial line on it. He later sold it to Alfred Edwards.

Between 1874 and 1879, he was vice president of the Historic Monuments Commission. Re-elected on the chamber's dissolution in 1877, he sat on the side of the Bonapartists and voted against one government initiative of the Third Republic after another, notably those on economic and colonial questions. In 1878, he was relieved of his role at the Crédit Foncier de France and so decided to profit from his fortune and concentrate on enlarging his business affairs as the carrier of Normandoux at Tercé, which he had acquired in 1869. He created the Banque d'Escompte de Paris as well as various other financial and insurance companies, and he heavily restored the château and church at Morthemer. Between 1881 and 1890, he was director of the "haras de Saint-Georges", near Moulins, which he had bought with the vicomte d’Harcourt and the duc de Castries.

Following irregularities, the Seine Tribunal of Commerce pronounced the Banque d’Escompte de Paris bankrupt in February 1894. The baron de Soubeyran was arrested and then freed, but his goods were all liquidated, and so, ruined, he died three years later.
