= Compagnie Algérienne =

French bank

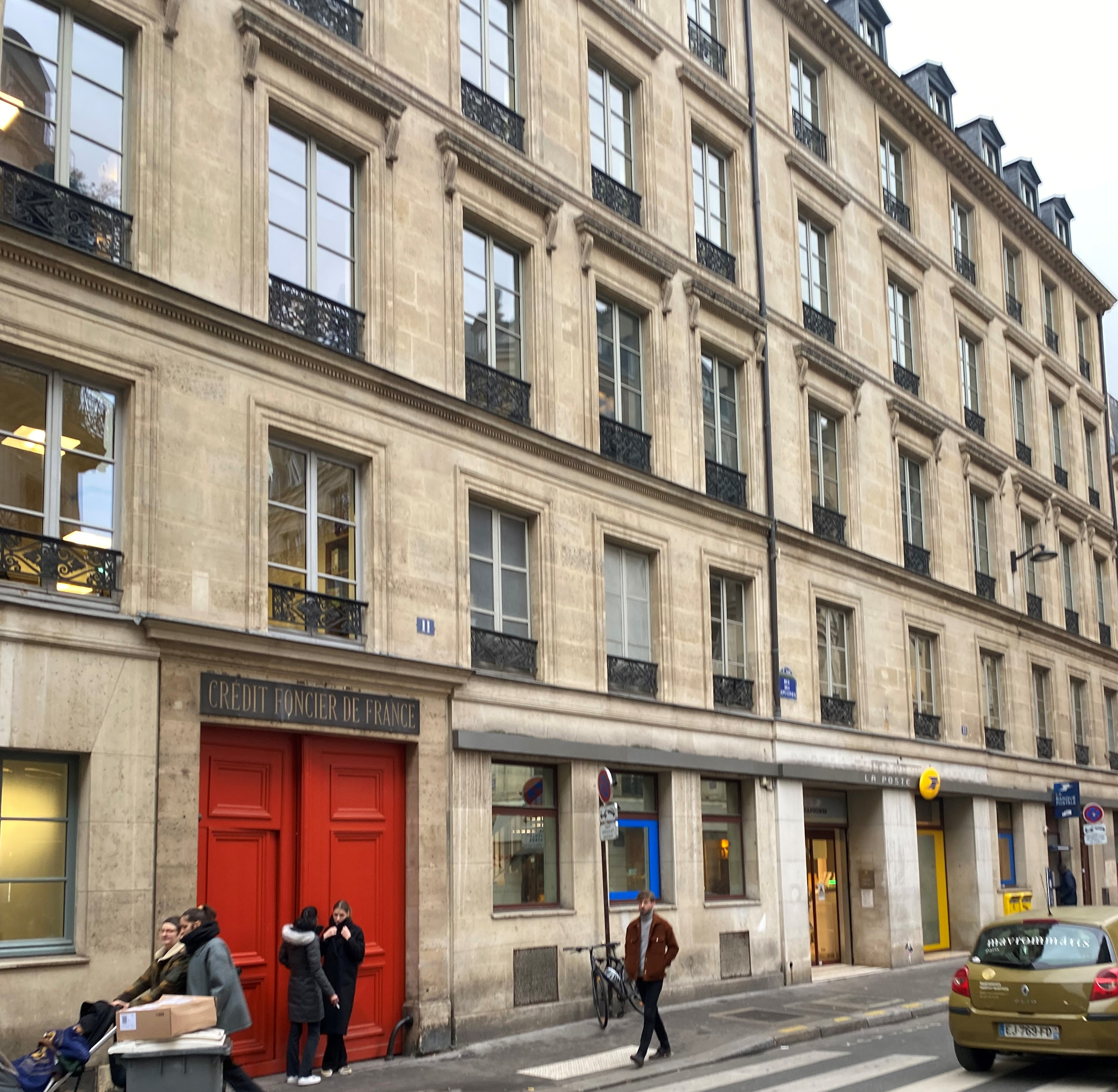
Building at 11-13, rue des Capucines in Paris, head office of the Compagnie Algérienne until 1908; later offices of Crédit Foncier de France and of the French Post Office

The Compagnie Algérienne (French pronunciation: [kɔ̃paɲi alʒeʁjɛn]), from 1942 to 1948 Compagnie Algérienne de Crédit et de Banque ([kɔ̃paɲi alʒeʁjɛn də kʁedi e də bɑ̃k], "Algerian Credit and Banking Company"), was a significant French bank with operations in Algeria, Morocco, Tunisia and Lebanon as well as mainland France. It was formed in 1877 in a restructuring of its predecessor entity, the Société Générale Algérienne ("General Algerian Company"), itself founded in 1865-68. The Compagnie Algérienne eventually merged in 1960 with the Banque de l'Union Parisienne. Following a series of subsequent restructurings, its main successor entities as of 2022 are the Crédit du Nord in France, the Crédit populaire d'Algérie in Algeria, the Banque de Tunisie in Tunisia, Attijariwafa Bank in Morocco, and the Banque Libano-Française in Lebanon.

== Société Générale Algérienne ==
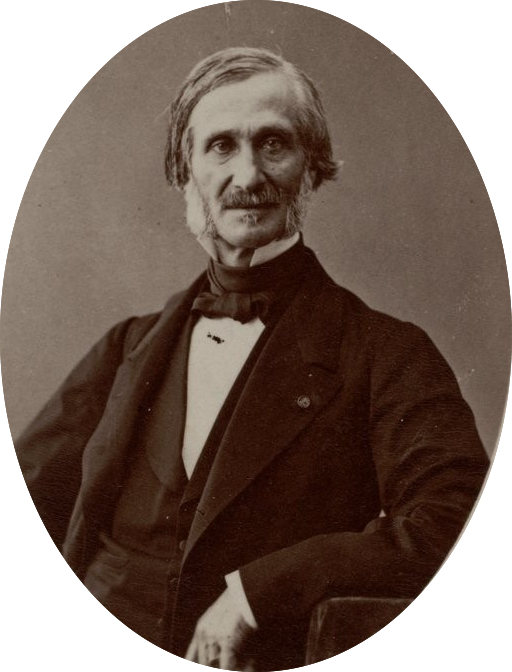
Louis Frémy (1805-1891), founding chairman of the SGA

The Société Générale Algérienne (SGA) was created in Paris on 18 May 1865, at a time of ambitious outward-oriented French business initiatives such as the Suez Company (est. 1858) or Imperial Ottoman Bank (est. 1863 with British partners). The SGA's founders included prominent French and international financiers such as Edward Charles Blount, Louis Frémy, Édouard Hentsch, and Paulin Talabot, as well as landowning French colonists in Algeria. Louis Frémy, the governor of Crédit Foncier de France, became its founding chairman on 10 November 1868. The company’s head office was established at 11-13, rue des Capucines in Paris, adjacent to the Crédit Foncier's own headquarters complex.

The SGA subsequently acquired vast landholdings and lent to finance mining, infrastructure and land development projects in Algeria, funded mainly by bond issuance. It opened banking offices in Algiers, Bône, Constantine, Oran as well as Marseille in 1869, and also provided short-term credit to Spain and Egypt. This dynamic expansion resulted in financial overstretch during the downturn of the mid-1870s, which also severely impacted Crédit Foncier, the SGA's main sponsor together with Société Générale.

== Compagnie Algérienne ==
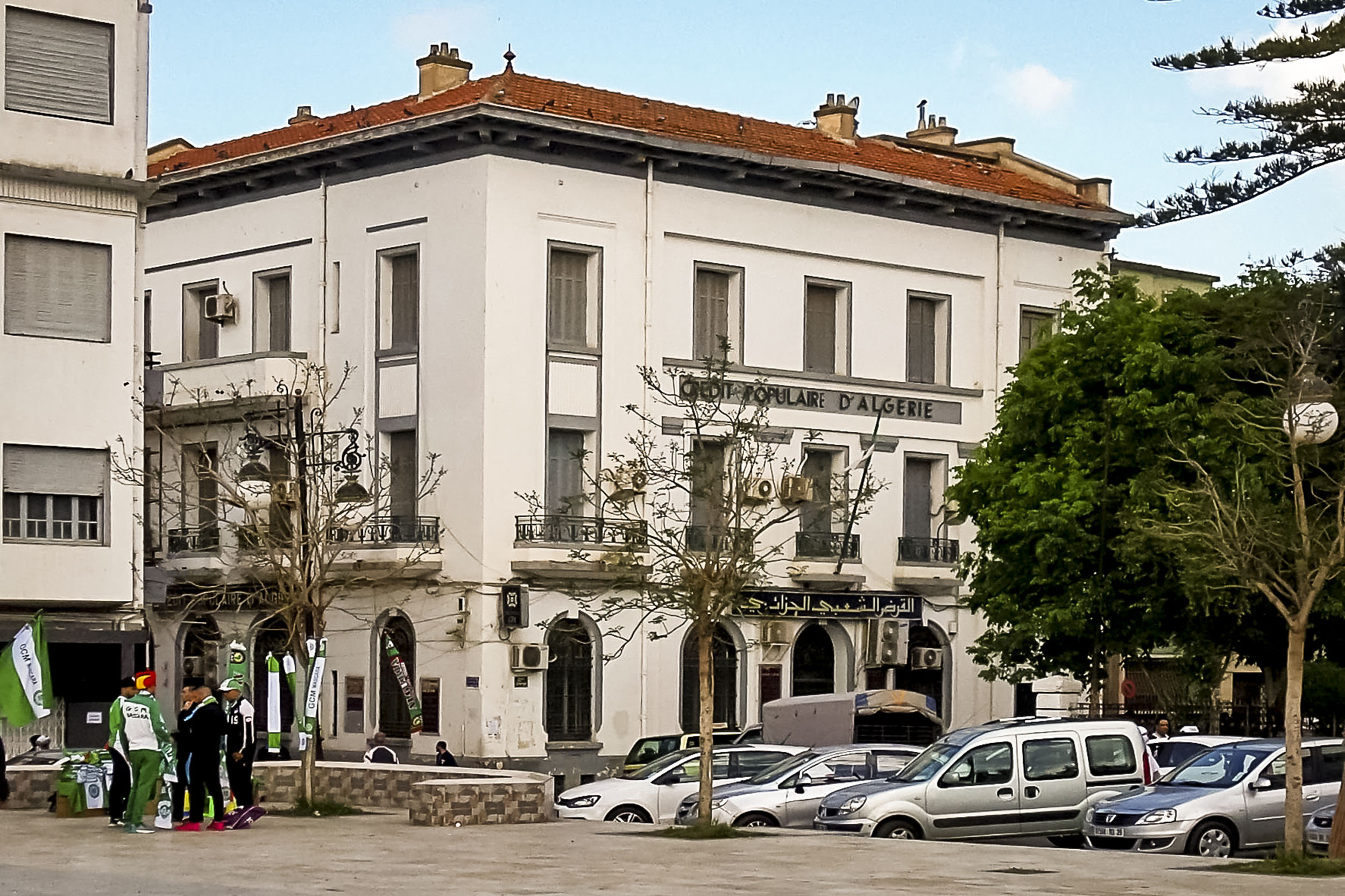
Former branch in Mascara, now Crédit Populaire d'Algérie

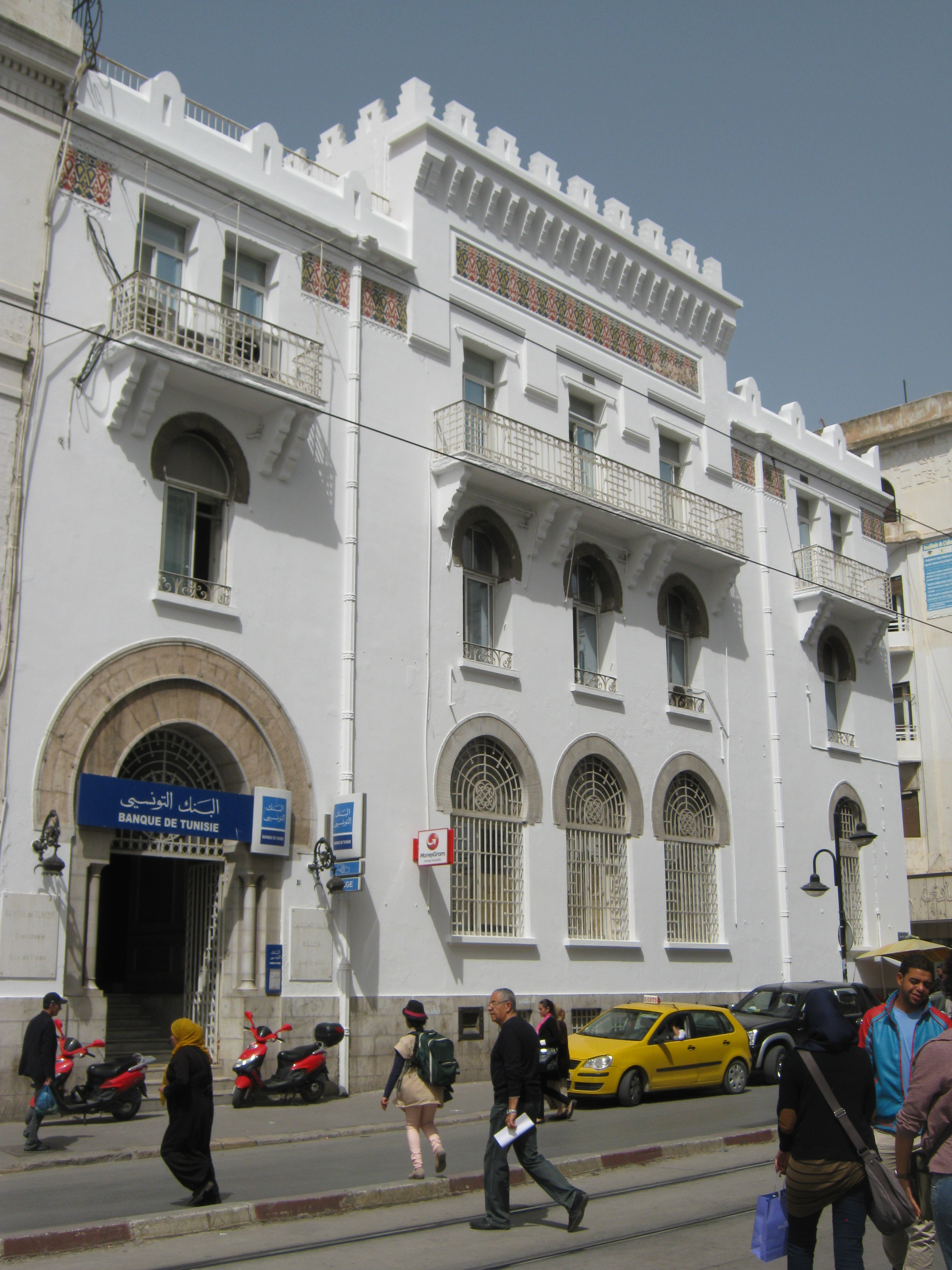
Former Tunis branch at 4, rue de Rome, now Banque de Tunisie

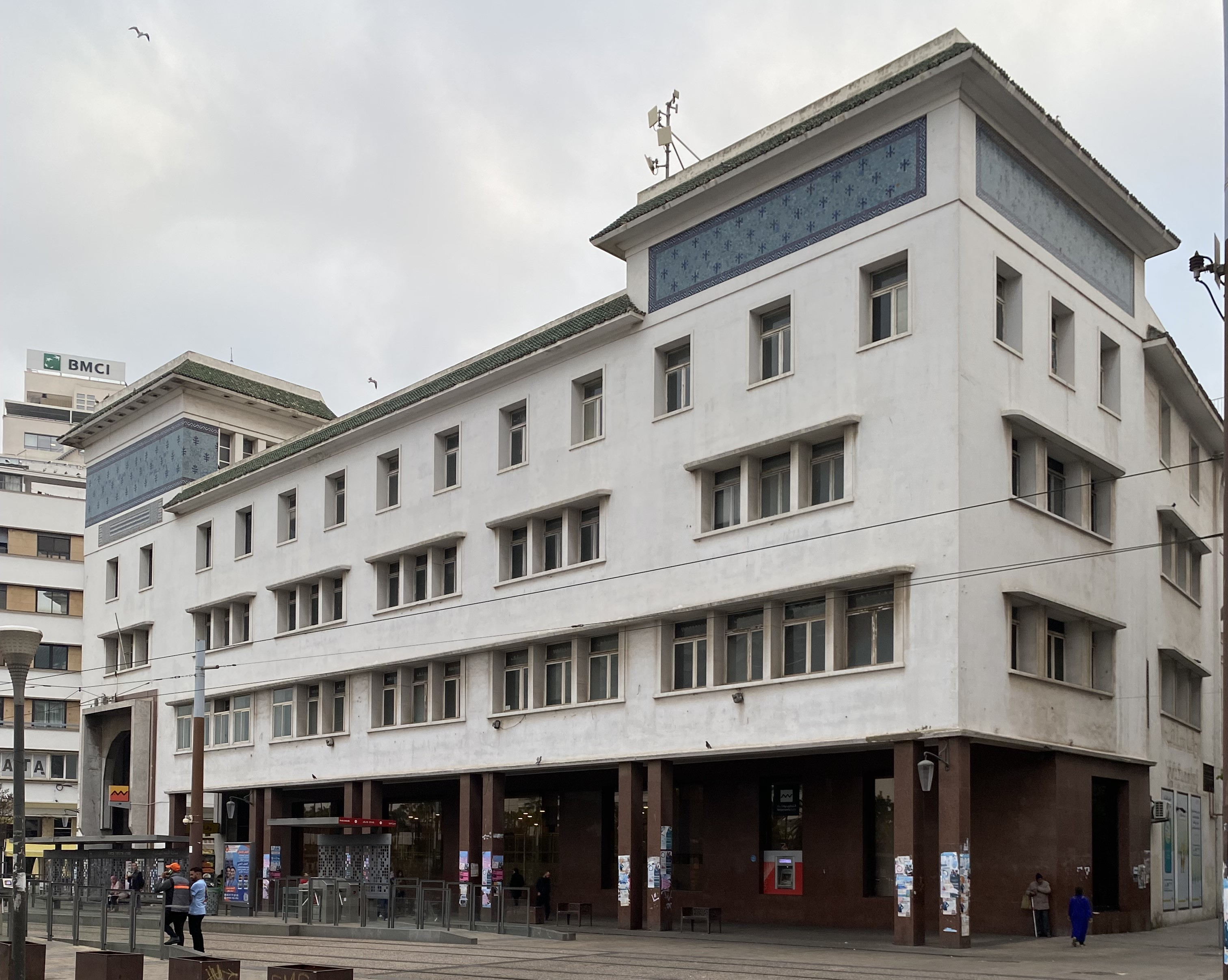
Former branch in Casablanca, erected 1928 on design by Henri Prost & Antoine Marchisio, later Attijariwafa Bank

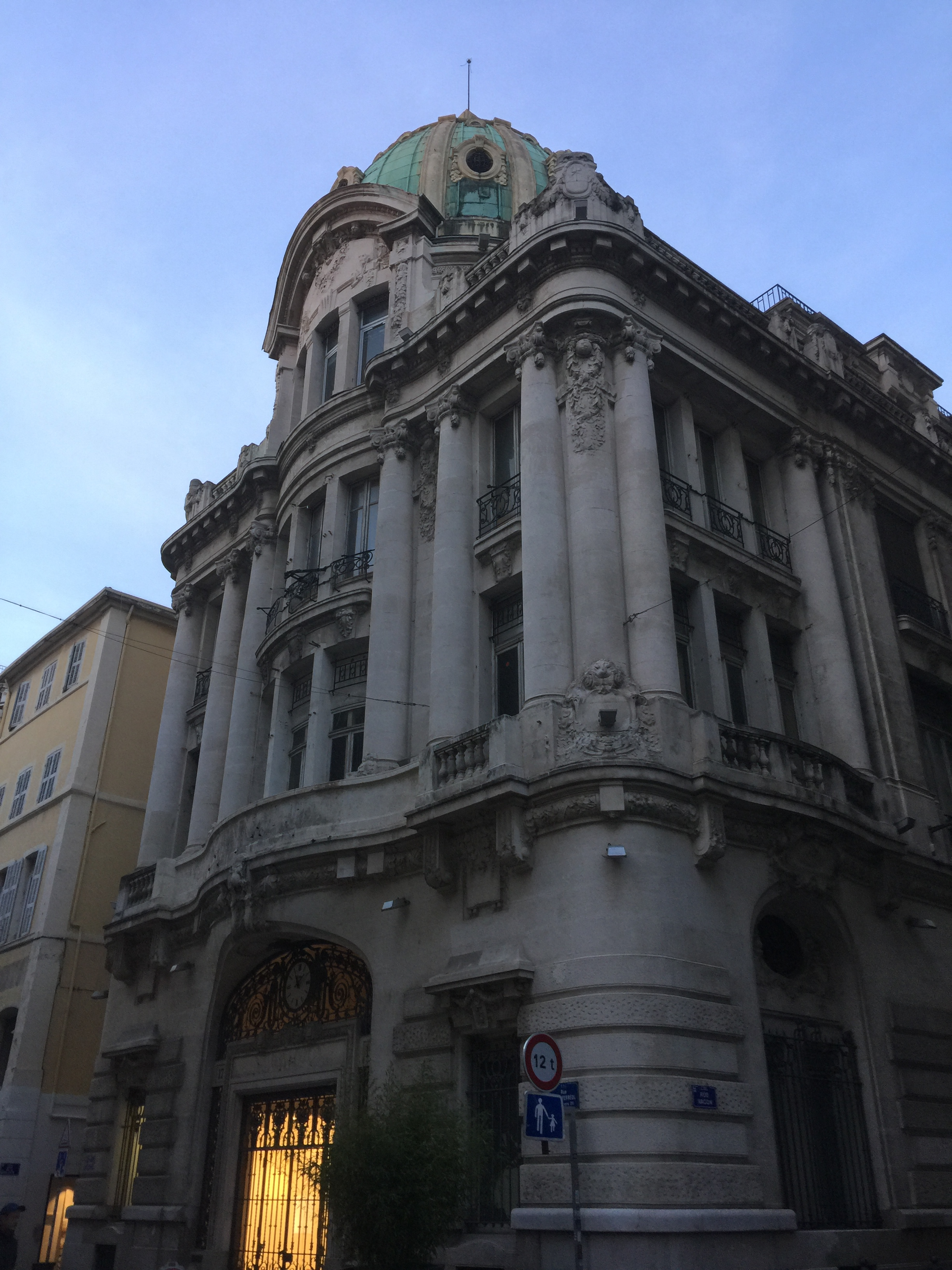
Former branch building at 17, rue Saint-Ferréol in Marseille

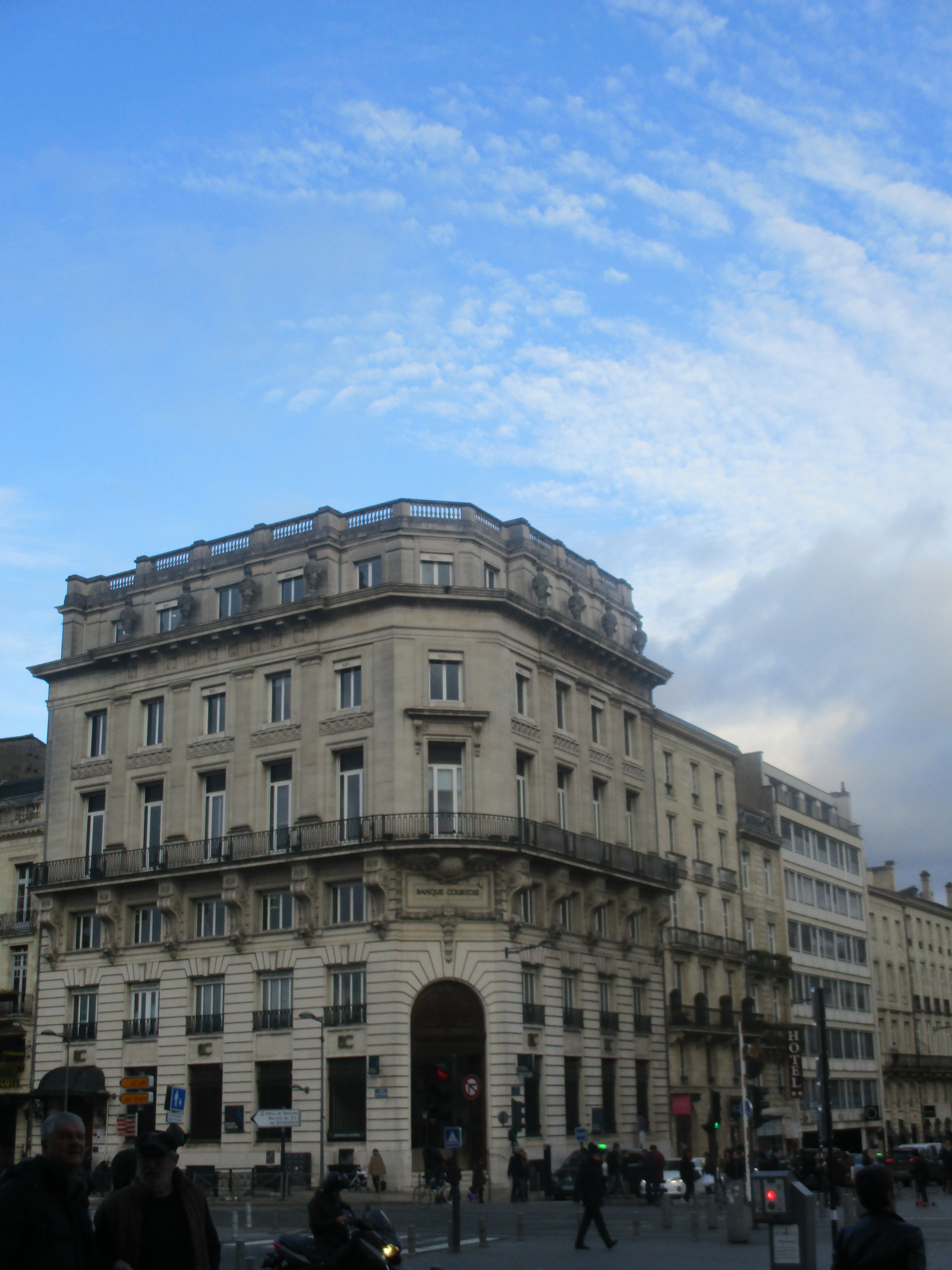
Former Bordeaux branch opened in 1919, later seat of the Crédit du Nord's affiliate Banque Courtois

The Compagnie Algérienne was formed in Paris on 30 November 1877 to acquire assets of the SGA which its shareholders had decided to liquidate; as part of the restructuring, the former SGA's shareholders received shares of the new company for 40 percent of their SGA shares' nominal value, and nearly all its creditors were eventually reimbursed. The Compagnie endeavored to develop its vast holdings in Algeria for agricultural production, and became a major provider of rural and urban mortgages. It expanded the SGA's previous commercial banking operations and opened new branches between 1878 and 1906 in Blida, Bougie, Mascara, Médéa, Sétif, Sidi Bel Abbès, and Souk Ahras..

By 1920, its Algerian branch network extended to Affreville (now Khemis Miliana), Aïn Beïda, Aïn Témouchent, Algiers, Aumale (now Sour El-Ghozlane), Batna, Blida, Boghari, Bône (now Annaba), Bordj Bou Arréridj, Bordj Bouira, Bordj Menaïel, Boufarik, Bougie, Colea, Constantine, Djidjelli, Guelma, Jemmapes (now Azzaba), Khenchela, Maison-Carrée (now El Harrach), Marengo (now Hadjout), Mascara, Médéa, Mostaganem, Orléansville (now Chlef), Palikao (now Tighennif), Philippeville (now Skikda), Relizane, Rio-Salado (now El Malah), Saïda, Saint-Arnaud (now El Eulma), Saint-Denis-de-Sig, Sétif, Sidi Bel Abbès, Soukahra, Tiaret, Tlemcen, and Vialar (now Tissemsilt).

The Compagnie soon expanded in the newly established French protectorate of Tunisia, with a branch in Tunis as early as 1881, followed by Sfax, Bizerte, and Sousse, then Béja and Mateur in 1909, and Gabès, Kairouan and Souk El Arba (now Jendouba) in 1910. In Morocco, it opened branches in Tangier in 1904, Casablanca in 1906, Safi and Oujda in 1910, Larache, Mazagan (now El Jadida) and Rabat in 1911. In the early 1910s it complemented its long-established presence in Marseille with branches on the French Riviera in Antibes, Cannes, Menton, Nice, and Vence, as well as Vichy. This expansion mirrored the rapid increase in the Compagnie's balance sheet and volume of operations in the first decades of the 20th century, in contrast to its comparatively slow development in the 1880s and 1890s. Its network of branches and offices thus grew from 65 in 1912 to 95 in 1921 and 180 in late 1931. In 1931, it also opened a branch in Beirut, from which it developed operations in Lebanon and Syria then under French administration.

In Paris, the Compagnie Algérienne's head office was successively established at 11-13 rue des Capucines (1877-1908), the former seat of the SGA; 22, rue Louis-Le-Grand (1908-1916); and 48-50, rue d'Anjou (1916-1960). In Algiers, it moved to a new building in 1910. In Marseille, it built an opulent branch at 17, rue Saint-Ferréol in 1919, and in Lyon, an art deco building at 5, rue du Bât-d'Argent in the early 1930s. By 1929, it was the eleventh-largest French bank by collected deposits. In the interwar period, it deepened its business relationship with Banque Mirabaud and correspondingly grew its investment banking operations. Its business was comparatively resilient during the crisis of the 1930s.

As of 1 January 1942, the company changed its name to Compagnie Algérienne de Crédit et de Banque. From 1 January 1949, the parent entity was again named Compagnie Algérienne, while the banking operations were run in a banking subsidiary, the Société Nouvelle de la Compagnie Algérienne de Crédit et de Banque, which in 1955 was in turn renamed Compagnie Algérienne de Crédit et de Banque (CACB).

== Aftermath ==
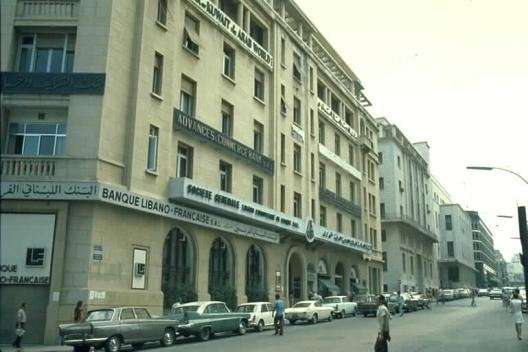
Banque Libano-Française head office on rue Riad El-Solh in Beirut, 1970

In 1960, the Banque de l'Union Parisienne (BUP), which had pre-existing financial links with both the Banque Mirabaud and its partner the Compagnie Algérienne, purchased the latter outright and merged it with its own parent entity. The banking subsidiary CACB was kept as a separate operation, and renamed Compagnie Française de Crédit et de Banque (CFCB) as of 1 January 1965 following Algerian independence. In 1964, the Moroccan operations were subsidiarized as the Compagnie Marocaine de Crédit et de Banque (CMCB), headquartered in Casablanca in line with the newly independent Moroccan government's policy of marocanisation of its banking sector. A new subsidiary, the "CFCB-Société Nouvelle", was created in 1965 and on 1 January 1966 took over the CFCB's banking network in mainland France.

Following the 1966 acquisition of the BUP by the Suez Company, the CFCB-Société Nouvelle merged on 1 January 1967 with other banking operations of the BUP and was renamed Banque de l'Union Parisienne-CFCB, majority-owned by the Compagnie de Suez. In 1971, that entity was renamed simply Banque de l'Union Parisienne, and Suez sold its 80% equity stake to the Banque de Paris et des Pays-Bas, which in turn merged it with the Crédit du Nord in 1973. As a consequence, the former mainland French branches of the Compagnie Algérienne became branches of the respective regional banks of the Crédit du Nord group (itself acquired in 1997 by Société Générale), e.g. the Société Marseillaise de Crédit in Marseille, the Banque Courtois in Bordeaux, or the Banque Nuger in Vichy.

The Algerian operations, left in the "old" CFCB retained by Suez, were the matter of protracted negotiations between Suez and the Algerian authorities. They were eventually nationalized in 1972, and transferred to the Crédit populaire d'Algérie.

The CFCB's Beirut branch was subsidiarized in 1967 as the Banque Libano-Française, which in 1992 became majority-owned by Banque Indosuez. The CFCB's Tunisian operations were acquired in 1968 by the Banque de Tunisie. The CFCB's Moroccan subsidiary, the SMCB, was acquired by Moroccan investors in 1968. It was renamed Wafabank in 1985, and in 2003 merged with Banque Commerciale du Maroc to form Attijariwafa Bank.

== Leadership ==
- Louis Frémy, Chairman of the Société Générale Algérienne 1868-1877
- Jules Tarbé des Sablons, Chairman 1878-1893
- Lucien Bordet, Chairman 1893-1923
- Jean Boissonnas, Chairman 1923-1942
- Jean Pallier, Chairman 1942-1960
- Antonin Bernard, Chairman 1965-1972

== See also ==
- Banque de l'Algérie
- Compagnie Marocaine
- List of banks in France
