= Banque de Tunisie et des Emirats =

Banque de Tunisie et des Emirats (BTE) is a bank in Tunisia. It is listed in the Bourse de Tunis.

== Overview ==
Banque de Tunisie et des Emirats was founded in 1982 as a result of an agreement between Tunisia and the United Arab Emirates. It is headquartered in Tunis, Tunisia. It is partly owned by the Abu Dhabi Investment Authority.
