= Banque de Tunisie =

First Tunisian bank established in modern times

Logo

The Banque de Tunisie (French pronunciation: [bɑ̃k də tynizi]; Arabic: البنك التونسي; lit. 'Bank of Tunisia') is a bank in Tunisia, the first established in the country in modern times. It has been listed in the Bourse de Tunis since 1990.

== History ==
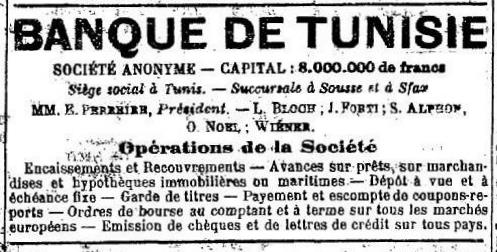
Advert for the Banque de Tunisie, 1900

Banque de Tunisie was established on 23 September 1884 by Banque Transatlantique, which transformed its Tunis office into a local banking institution three years after the establishment of the French protectorate of Tunisia. Its first seat was a small building at 3, rue Es-Sadikia, now rue Gamal Abdel Nasser, opposite the French protectorate residence. That building was later demolished. The bank's founders sought to obtain from the French government the exclusive right to issue banknotes in the protectorate, but that privilege was ultimately granted to the Banque de l'Algérie in 1904.

In 1911, Banque de Tunisie joined Banque Transatlantique in the creation of the Banque Commerciale du Maroc, which was headquartered in Paris and had its main office in Casablanca. In 1941, Banque de Tunisie and Banque Transatlantique were acquired by Crédit Industriel et Commercial (CIC), in a transaction carried out under the conditions created by the Vichy anti-Jewish legislation. In 1948, the bank absorbed the Tunis branch of the Banque italo-française de crédit. Three years later, in 1951, it led the liquidation of the Tunis-based Banca italiana di credito; both institutions had mainly served Italian Tunisian clients.

Around the time of Tunisian independence in 1956, CIC agreed to transfer most of its 70% stake in Banque de Tunisie to the Tunisian government. At that point, most of the bank's employees were Jewish, as were roughly one third of its depositors. In 1963, Banque de Tunisie took over the Société Générale branches in Tunis and Sfax, while Société Générale received a 17.5% shareholding in return. Other European and American banks later acquired minority stakes in Banque de Tunisie.

In 1968, the bank acquired the former Tunisian operations of France's Compagnie Algérienne. Tunisian shareholders regained majority ownership of the bank's capital in 1977. By the late 2000s, they jointly held about three quarters of its equity, while Crédit Mutuel, which had taken over CIC in 1998, owned 20%. Banque de Tunisie also had, at that time, the largest market capitalization among listed Tunisian companies.

Belhassen Trabelsi, brother of Leïla Ben Ali, the wife of President Zine El Abidine Ben Ali, was among the bank's board members. In late 2012, Crédit Mutuel increased its stake to 33% after acquiring shares formerly held by the Trabelsi family.

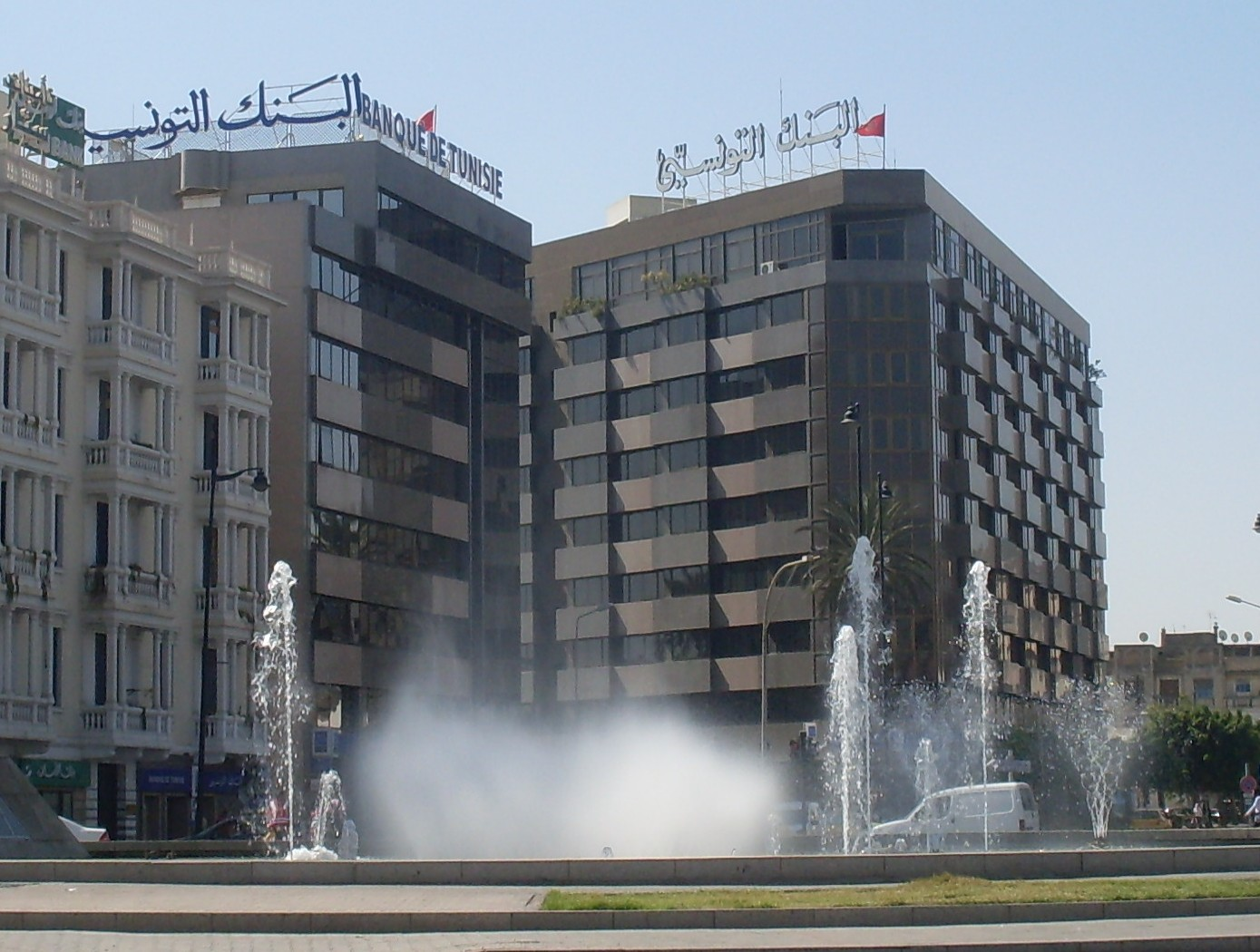
Current headquarters complex on rue de Turquie in Tunis

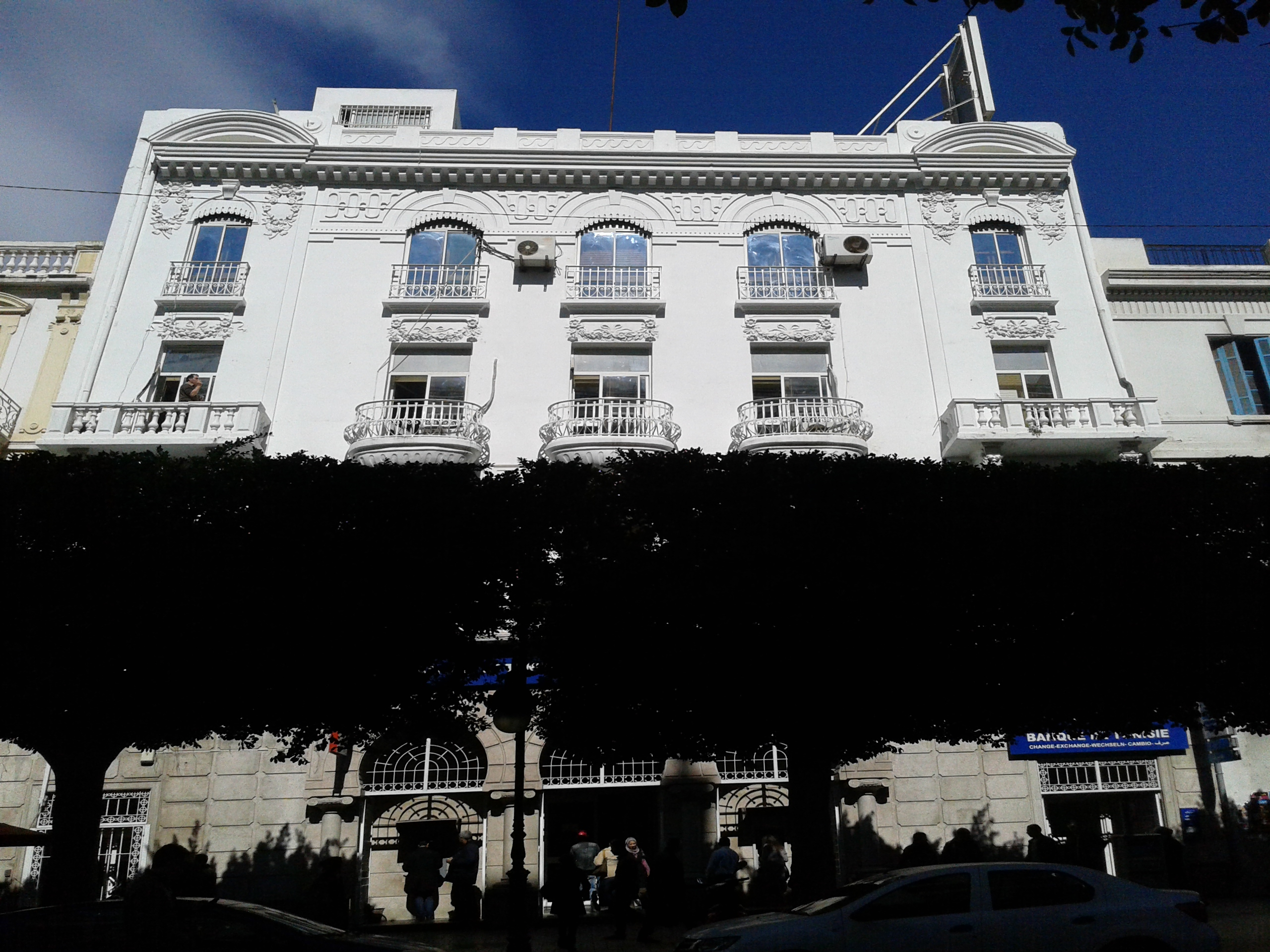
Main old downtown branch on Avenue de France (Tunis)

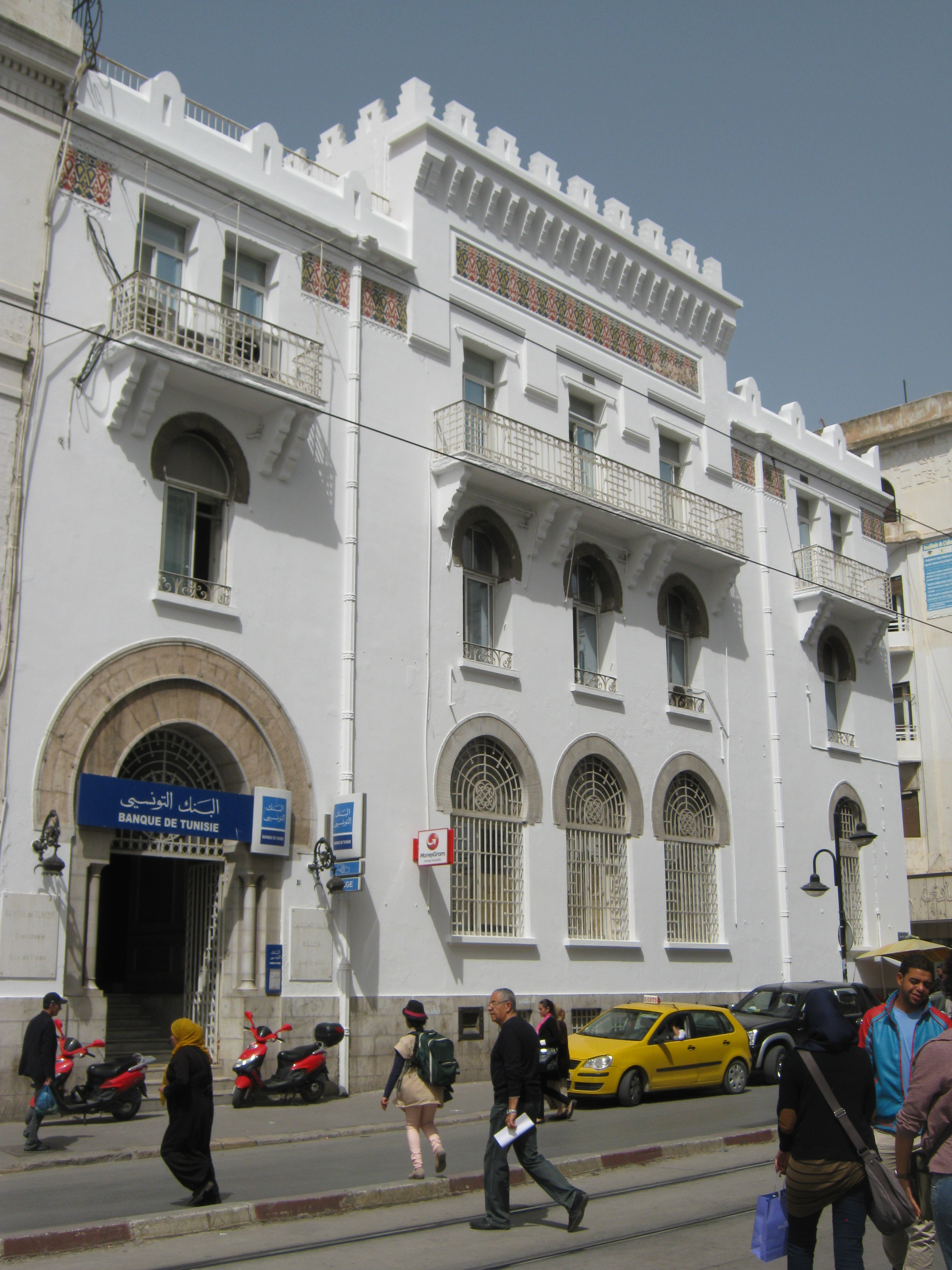
Branch on Rue de Rome (Tunis), former Tunis office of the Compagnie Algérienne

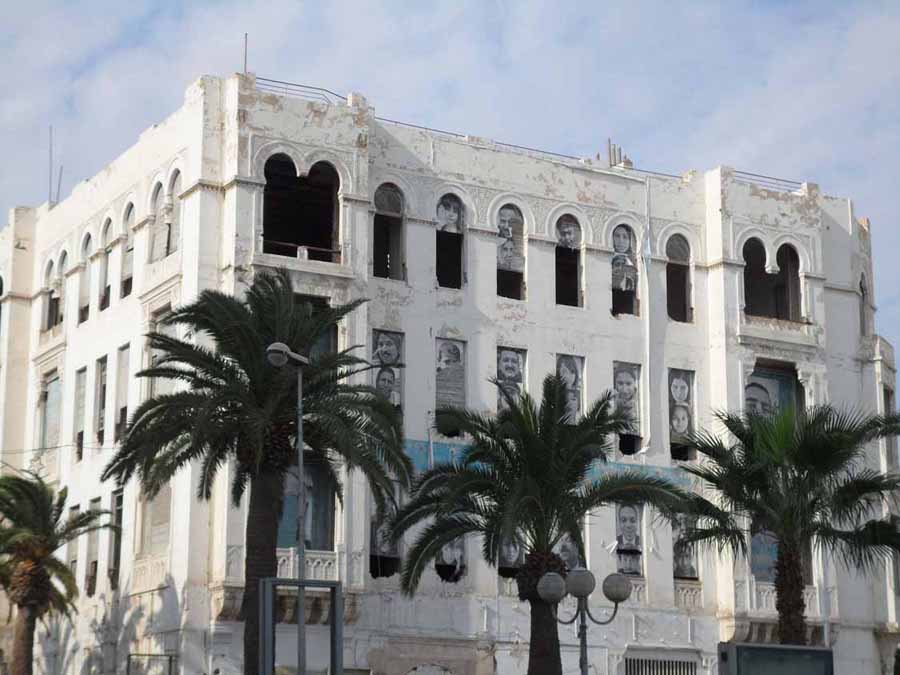
Former branch in Sfax, erected in 1916 on a design by architect Raphaël Guy

== See also ==
- List of banks in Tunisia
- Compagnie Algérienne
