= Le Clairon =

Short-lived French newspaper

- Type: Daily newspaper
- Editor-in-chief: Jules Cornély
- Founded: March 1881
- Ceased publication: 1882
- Language: French language
- Headquarters: Paris

Le Clairon was a short-lived French newspaper, published daily, that was pro-royalist and pro-Catholic. It was founded in March 1881 with support from the Duchesse d'Uzès, from Alfred Edwards and from France's Catholic bank Union Générale, which owned one hundred shares. Paul Eugène Bontoux (1820–1904), chief executive of the Union Générale, controlled the financial articles of Le Clairon, by means of a "Société de Publicité Universelle", which he had created and which funded the financial advertising pages.

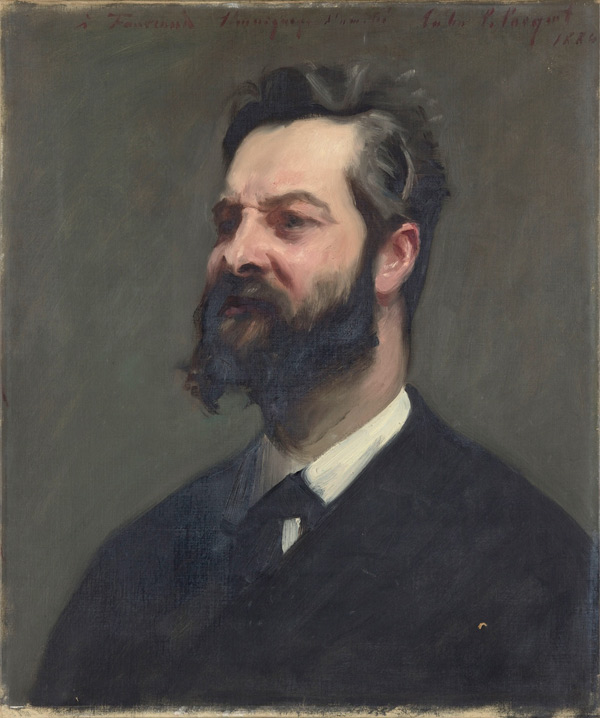
Louis de Fourcaud (1851-1914), John Singer Sargent, 1884

The editor-in-chief Jules Cornély (1845–1907), recruited staff from another daily newspaper Le Gaulois. They consisted of eleven journalists, including Louis de Fourcaud, Raoul Toché, Gabriel Terrail, called "Mermeix" (1859–1930), Arsène Houssaye (1815–1896) and Émile Blavet (1838–1924).

The shareholders of Le Clairon sold the newspaper to Arthur Meyer, who also acquired the Le Gaulois in 1882 and then the Paris-Journal and merged the three newspaper franchises. The merged newspaper was published under the title Le Gaulois from August 1884. Jules Cornély had meanwhile resigned and joined the daily newspaper Le Matin but in 1888 returned to Le Gaulois (which merged with Le Figaro in 1929).
