= Union Bancaire pour le Commerce et l'Industrie =

Bank in Tunisia

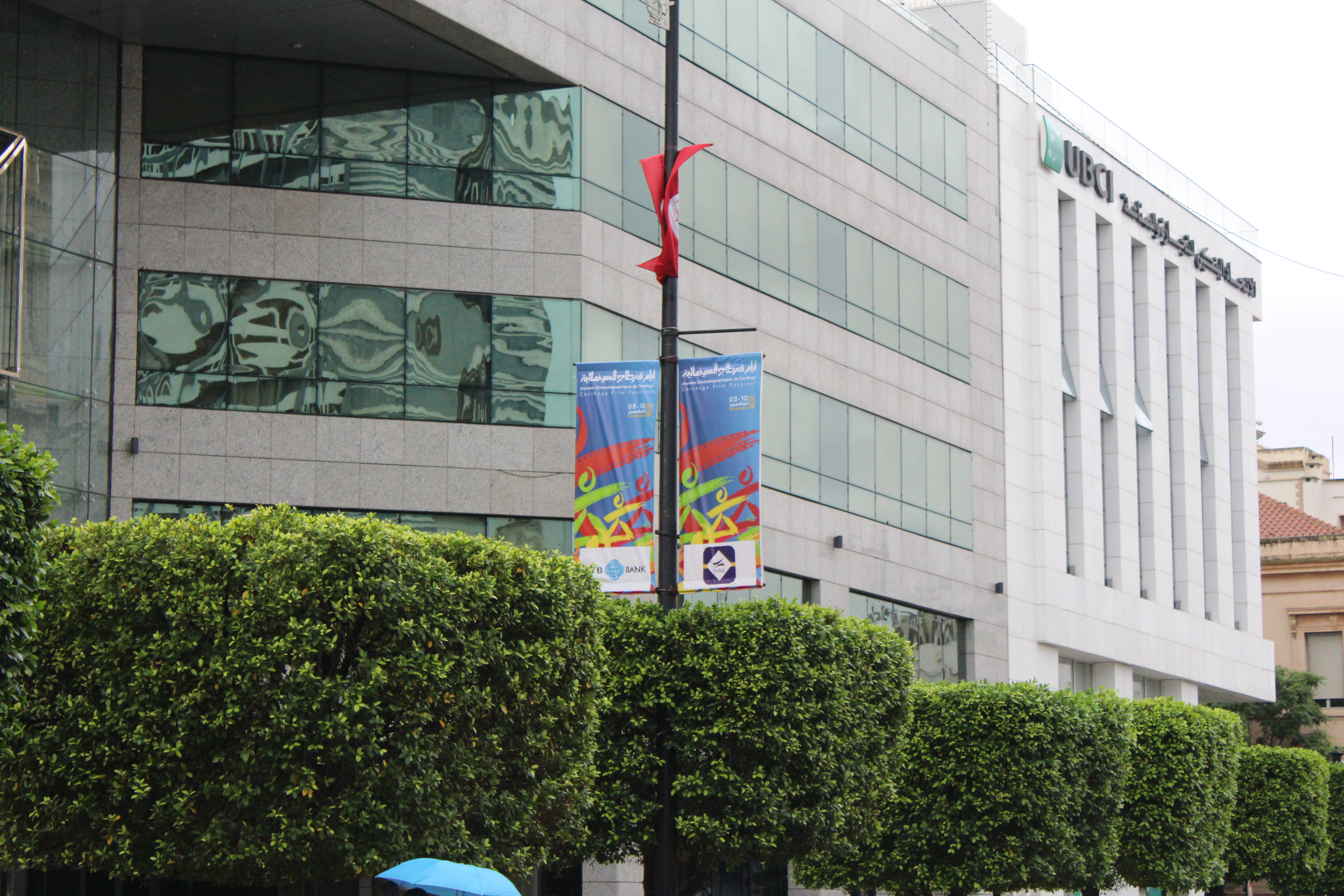
UBCI head office on Avenue Habib Bourguiba in Tunis, photographed in 2018 still with BNP Paribas logo

Union Bancaire pour le Commerce et l'Industrie (UBCI, Arabic: الاتحاد البنكي للتجارة والصناعة) is a bank based in Tunis, Tunisia. It was formed in 1961 by merger of prior operations of the Banque Nationale pour le Commerce et l'Industrie (BNCI). It was subsequently controlled by BNCI until 1966, then by its successors the Banque Nationale de Paris (BNP) until 2000 and BNP Paribas until 2021, when it was acquired by Tunisian insurer the Compagnie d'Assurance et de Réassurance Tuniso-Européenne (CARTE) controlled by the Doghri family.

== Overview ==
The Paris-based BNCI formed UBCI in 1961 in anticipation of Algerian independence, by merging its Tunis-based subsidiary, the Union Financière et Technique de Tunisie (UFITEC, lit. 'Financial and Technical Union of Tunisia', est. 1955), with BNCI-Afrique (BNCI-A, based in Algiers) which also had operations in Tunisia. BNCI-A had been originally established in 1927 as the Union Nord-Africaine pour la Finance, l'Agriculture et l'Industrie, then renamed as Banque de l'Union Nord-Africaine (BUNA) in 1930, then again renamed as BNCI-A in 1940 after the BNCI acquired a majority stake. From its formation the UBCI had branches in Tunis (rue Mokhtar-Attia and rue Es-Sadikia), Bizerte, Grombalia, Mateur, Sfax, and Sousse.

In 1969, following BNCI's merger with the Comptoir National d'Escompte de Paris (CNEP) three years earlier, UBCI absorbed the Banque d'Escompte et de Crédit à l'Industrie en Tunisie (BEIT). The latter had been established in 1963 as a partnership between the CNEP, the Banque Industrielle de l'Afrique du Nord (BIAN), and Morgan Guaranty Trust. The BIAN had been created in 1919 in Paris, with its main office in Algiers until Algerian independence, and had opened its first branch in Tunis in the early 1920s. The BEIT took over the BIAN's Tunisian network as well as the CNEP's branches in the country, the first of which had opened in 1894 in Tunis.

At end-2014, UBCI had 111 branches and 1,232 employees. By 2019, BNP Paribas held 50.1 percent of UBCI. That year, it announced the sale of 39 percent to CARTE Group. The transaction was completed in March 2021, following which BNP Paribas retained an 11.1 percent stake. In late 2021, UBCI adopted a new logo and visual identity that is no longer linked with the BNP Paribas Group.

== Leadership ==
- Abderrazak Zouari, chairman 2011-2016
- Fethi Mestiri, chairman 2016–2021
- Pierre Bérégovoy, CEO 2016–2021
- Hassine Doghri, chairman since April 2021
- Mohamed Koubâa, CEO since April 2021

== See also ==
- List of banks in Tunisia
