= Banque Nationale Agricole =

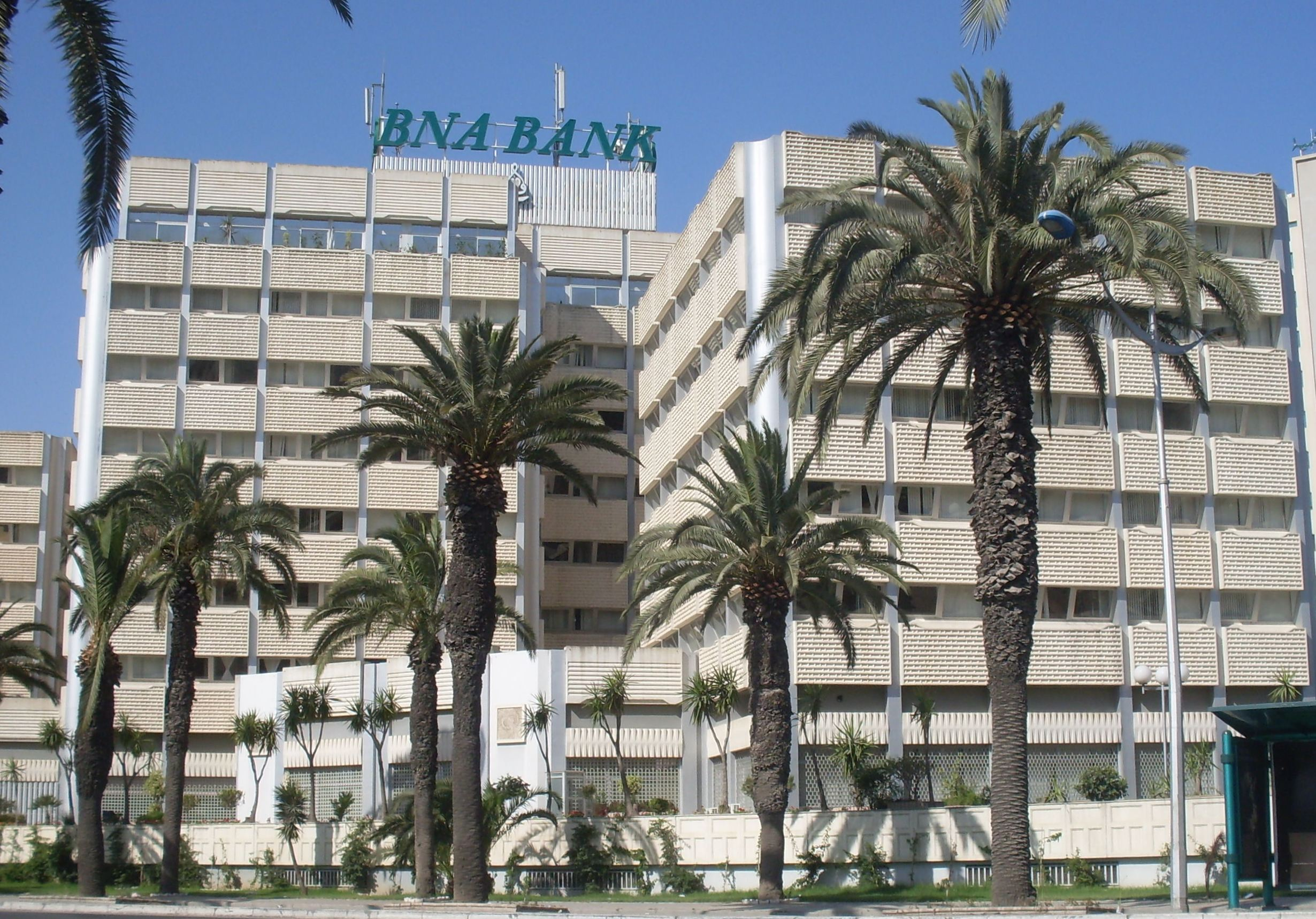
Banque Nationale Agricole's headquarters

Banque Nationale Agricole (BNA) is a state-controlled bank in Tunisia. It is listed in the Bourse de Tunis.

== History ==
The Banque Nationale Agricole was created on 1 June 1959, and launched by President Habib Bourguiba on 10 October 1959. In 1969, it changed its name to Banque Nationale de Tunisie. On 24 June 1989, it merged with the Banque Nationale de Développement Agricole and was renamed Banque Nationale Agricole.

It is the main bank in rural Tunisia.
