= Early political career of Habib Bourguiba =

The early political career of Habib Bourguiba began in the early 1930s when he joined the main political party of the Tunisian national movement, the Destour. His political beginnings were characterized with a "battle" in newspapers such as L'Étandar Tunisien and La voix du Tunisien, while defending Tunisia's integrity and the preservation of its national identity. Shocked by the 1930 International Eucharistic Congress of Carthage, Bourguiba and his mates decided to start a press campaign to denounce the event. They soon acquired an unprecedented popularity, and stood out from the elders of Destour. They attracted the hostility of settlers, eager to put an end to their activism and press campaign. However, Bourguiba and his friends founded their own newspaper, despite the colonial attempts to stop them. L'Action Tunisienne was thus created in order to defend the "little people" in a context of economic crisis, following the Great Depression.

Bourguiba, worried about his country's state, knew that a good cause would revive the national movement, weakened by the 1926 repressions. In order to do so, he was the only one to defend M'hamed Chenik, a Tunis notable, who had been in trouble with the Residence, the French colonial administration. Bourguiba jumped at the chance to rally the bourgeoisie class to the nationalist cause. But his attempt failed and ended up dividing L'Action team. In this context, the uprising following the Tunisian naturalization issue, in early 1933, was the perfect opportunity for him. He started another successful press campaign. With his friends Tahar Sfar, Mahmoud El Materi, Bahri Guiga and his brother M'hamed, they sensitized lower classes to their cause and changed the Residence policy. The popularity he acquired during the event, led to his election as a member of the executive committee of the Destour, in May 1933. However, differences with the elders caused him to resign from the party in September 1933.

== First steps in politics ==
=== Challenging the protectorate ===
In the early 1930s, Bourguiba joined the Destour party, then the major political organization of the Tunisian national movement. He rose to its leadership along with Mahmoud El Materi, Bahri Guiga, Tahar Sfar and his brother M'hamed. As preparations took place to host French President Paul Doumer as part of the celebrations of the 50th anniversary of the protectorate, nationalists were not pleased. In an article he wrote in Le Croissant, a newspaper managed by his cousin Abdelaziz El-Aroui, Bourguiba denounced the festivities as a "humiliating affront to the dignity of the Tunisian people to whom France recalls the loss of freedom and independence".

Following these events, the Destour leadership gathered in an emergency meeting at the Hôtel d'Orient in February 1931. It was decided to constitute a supporting committee for Chedly Khairallah's weekly newspaper, La Voix du Tunisien, which became a daily. The young nationalists joined the team and wrote critical analyses of the protectorate. Bourguiba, unlike his elders, dared to challenge the protectorate, publishing numerous articles and defining his own views on the colonial administration. He questioned both its effects and existence, writing:

A State can not be both subject and sovereign: Any treaty of protectorate, because of its nature, carries its own seed of death [...] Is it a lifeless country, a degenerate people who declines? Reduced to be nothing more than a dust of individuals; that means awaiting for downfall [...] In short, total and inevitable demise. Is it, in contrary, a sain people, vigorous, that international races or a momentary crisis forced them to accept the tutelage of a strong state, the necessarily inferior status imposed upon them, the contact of a more advanced civilization determines in them a salutary reaction [...] a real regeneration occurs in them and through judicious assimilation, they inevitably come to realize in stages their final emancipation. Time will tell if the Tunisian people belong to one or the other category.

— Habib Bourguiba, La Voix du Tunisien (February 23, 1931)

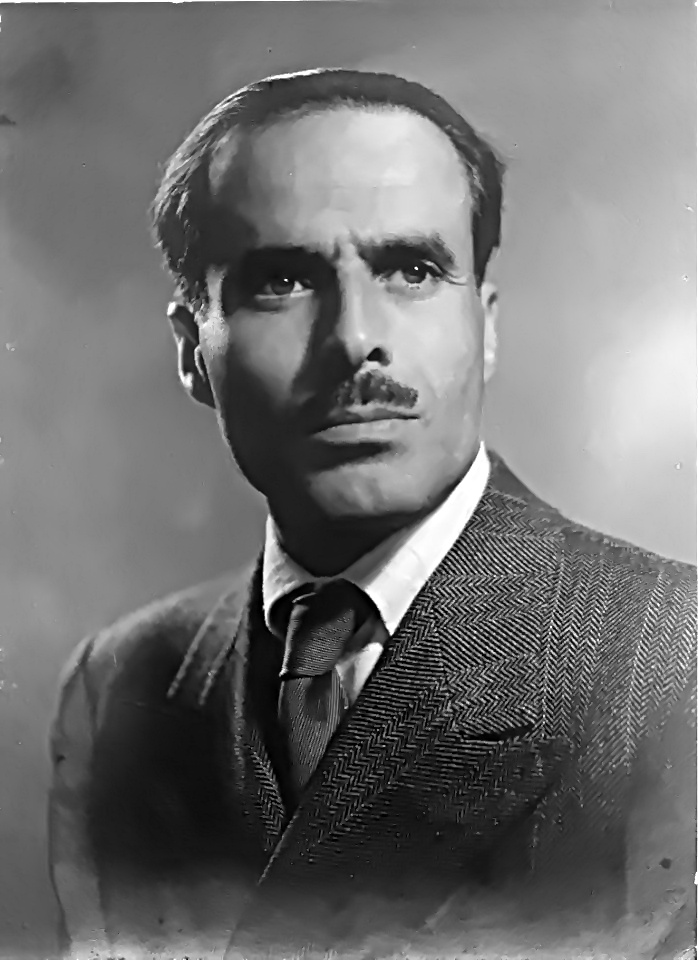
Portrait of Habib Bourguiba in the early 1930s

La Voix du Tunisien became a very popular newspaper because of the originality with which Bourguiba, Sfar, Guiga and Materi addressed problems. They stood out from their Destour elders by their new ways of thinking. Bourguiba reckoned the end of the protectorate as the outcome of an evolution that had taken its roots in the very principles of French civilization, unlike Abdelaziz Thâalbi, who thought of it as a breakup, in an article he wrote in La Tunisie martyre. Referred to as the "four musketeers", they were in favor of the intangibility of national personality and political sovereignty of the Tunisian people with a progressive emancipation of the country, while advocating for a nationalism that struggled against a regime and not a civilization.

Their work soon attracted the interest of both public opinion and wealthy landowners and businessmen (prépondérants) who had a strong influence on the colonial administration. Hostile to their daring plea, the prépondérants wrote in La Tunisie française: "Mr Bourguiba proposes to transform the Destourian lament into a doctoral thesis in law. The claims are not modest [...] They must be demanded to tone down their Voix du Tunisien". During the conference he held in November 1973, Bourguiba related the events of his beginnings in journalism and the success of his articles:

A strong turmoil had broken in Tunisia. In cafés and public places, my articles were read and commented. They seriously bothered French people because they did not only paint a grim picture of the current conditions, they also denounced, through logical deductions, the hidden agendas of authorities and exposed their concealed wills. I denounced the goals they had aimed and alerted them against the dangers of their policy that only could, eventually, jeopardize the security of France. I highlighted, at last, all the interests the french government had to negotiate with a free and independent Tunisian state.

— Habib Bourguiba, Fourth conference held on November 9, 1973.

The prépondérants were successful in their attempts to silence the nationalist papers as the colonial administration censored An-Nahdha, the daily paper of the reformist party and the weekly Ez-Zohra, on May 12, 1931. Within days, Habib and M'hamed Bourguiba, Bahri Guiga, Salah Farhat and Mahmoud El Materi were sued. Chedli Khalledi, a member of the Destour party, alerted Marius Moutet and Gaston Bergery, chief of staff to Édouard Herriot, who were friends of the nationalists and had influence in Paris. Bergery quickly interfered, contacted the head of the African-Orient department in the Ministry of Foreign Affairs, and obtained an adjournment of their hearings to June 9, 1931. Awaiting trial, the editors of La Voix du Tunisien launched a press protest campaign whose tone was both violent and revolutionary. El Materi wrote: "When we started political action, we knew in advance what was awaiting us [...] May the hand that strikes me be heavy, may the judges that charge me be ruthless [...] A cause that does not engender martyrs is lost in advance."

On the day of trial, the streets that led to the court were full of people. Shops and stores of the medina quarter were closed and law enforcement could not handle the turmoil. The crowd carried them in triumph as their hearings were, once again, postponed. Fearing overthrow, François Manceron, then-resident-general, met with Chedly Khairallah, manager of La Voix du Tunisien, at his residence in La Marsa, to find a compromise. That very afternoon, he invited the drafting committee of the newspaper and declared that he had an interview, that morning, with Khairallah. He also announced that a compromise was found. This lie made mischief within the group. Bourguiba asked Khairallah for further clarifications and he confirmed the rendezvous with the resident-general. In response the drafting committee demanded the management of the daily journal but, upon Khairallah's refusal to do so, decided to leave the newspaper.

=== Founding of L'Action Tunisienne ===
After they left the newspaper, the La Voix du Tunisien team kept in touch and gathered sometimes in the Café de la Kasbah or the Baghdad restaurant to discuss news and ideas, along with French and Tunisian socialist friends, such as the pharmacist Ali Bouhageb. During these meetings, the idea of creating a new newspaper was considered as they missed expressing their ideas. A drafting committee was formed that included Habib and M'hamed Bourguiba, Bahri Guiga, Tahar Sfar, Mahmoud El Materi and Ali Bouhageb, who also managed the publishing firm. Béchir Mehedhbi, a final year student, took charge of the editorial office. As for the newspaper headquarters, they were settled in the back of the Bouhageb pharmacy.

In the midst of an economic crisis that mainly affected lower classes, L'Action Tunisienne published its first edition on November 1, 1932. Bourguiba, who studied public finance during his university studies of political science in Paris, devoted his first article to the budget, which he called the "Tunisian budget". He explained his idea writing: "I used to demonstrate that budget reflected the policy of the government and that it permitted to believe that the country was thrown into abyss."

Disappointed in the resigned moderation of their elders, the young nationalists defended lower classes. Bouhajeb devoted an entire section of the newspaper for this purpose, which he called La Voix du guenillard, while the other members of the drafting committee wrote in turn in their editorials. Fed information through documents provided by administration officials, they soon became famous among the public. Bourguiba, who was increasingly known for his work, socialized with Tunisois notables and went frequently to intellectual discussion circles where he met the Boulakbeche family. He proved himself to be clear and specific in his writings, which revealed a "talented polemist" with his strong legal arguments. He was committed to demonstrate the mechanism of colonial abuse from the effects to the causes, showing a great interest in social phenomenon, inviting workers and students to organize in order to defended themselves against abuse. He also insisted on the defence and safeguard of the Tunisian personality, writing:

Tunisia is a market for France whose products sold at low prices ruin Tunisians who are forced to close their businesses, and reduce to the unemployment thousands of workers. The drought in cereal areas worsens the consequences of the global recession, which caused a tragic slump of wine and oil production. While famine spreads in the country, employees are crushed by taxes. As long as there will be satiated and hungry at the same table, open or sneaky war is a necessity, the use of force is a duty and peace among men a chimera.

— Habib Bourguiba, L'Action Tunisienne

== Reviving the National movement ==
=== The M'hamed Chenik case ===
In February 1933, a major fight within L'Action Tunisienne turned into a crisis, following the case of M'hamed Chenik, banker and chairman of the Tunisian Credit Union, which dominated the medina. In 1932, Chenik went to Paris as the vice-president of the Tunisian representatives of the Great Council, in order to alert the French government about the problems of indigenous agriculture. France decided to designate a committee chaired by Louis Tardy, manager of the National Agricultural Credit Fund, to investigate the situation in Tunisia. This move did not please the Residence which denounced the "convicted diligence" of Chenik. The colonial administration thus decided to seal his bank accounts. Despite this, there was no reaction in public opinion or among nationalists, even though the Tunisian members of the Great Council were collaborating with the protectorate. Only Bourguiba disapproved of the reaction of his friends, that he qualified as primary, writing: "I had there a first-hand witness who would give me weapons against the Protectorate and means to strengthen my position towards this regime. It was me who was winning in such a process. I did not care that some personalities improve their image at the same time."

Even though some people argued that Bourguiba acted out of personal interest, (he and his brother were tied to the bank by a loan), his aims were mainly related to reviving Tunisian nationalism. Chenik stated in an interview that any collaboration with France became impossible. Bourguiba saw in this case a victory that could rally the bourgeois class, considered to be collaborating with France, and unify the country around nationalism. He wrote: "We need to focus our attention on the event that had happened, on the argument which had been offered, so that we could widen our movement to important social classes of the nation, once indifferent or hostile to our program".

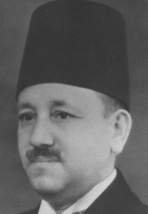
Portrait of M'hamed Chenik

To achieve his goal, he used "non-orthodox approaches". He went to L'Action headquarters to remove a critical part of his brother M'hamed, written in an article by Ali Bouhajeb, whom he did not inform. Bourguiba testified about his act in 1973 saying:

My brother, Si M'hamed, had obtained a written statement of Mr M'hamed Chenik, who was a member of the Great Council. In this report of many pages, carefully typed and initialed, Mr Chenik, who had probably been in trouble with his French colleagues, violently criticized the colonial administration and the Tardi committee. As for me, it was a windfall. The opportunity to denounce the abuses of the Protectorate authorities was given to me. I had therefore published the document on our newspaper. This initiative did not please Mr Ali Bouhajeb, who tried to explain his behavior with his unwillingness to see Mr Chenik claim leadership. Thus, he had drafted a sharp criticism, addressed to my brother, and published it on the same paper. I was dismayed to see the members of a same team tear each other apart in the columns of their very newspaper [...] considering that my brother was himself part of the drafting committee. I had removed three lines before the layout. The next day, the author of the article raged against what he called censorship and expressed his will to leave us.

Supported by Guiga and M'hedhbi, Bouhajeb judged Bourguiba's attitude and that of the journal in this case to be "unacceptable" before the three handed over their resignations. One of them later testified that: "Curiously, this excited Bourguiba. He was crushed because Bouhajeb and Mehedbi took care of all the material details, but he was a man of challenge." Bourguiba then abandoned his lawyer's office and decided to manage the newspaper on his own.

While the Great Council gathered to adjudicate on the agricultural budget, inspired by the recommendation of the Tardi committee, Bourguiba sent out a "supreme warning", writing: "We will be particularly inexorable against the last-minute setbacks or interested jilting." His arrogance with the protectorate, and his determination to stand up to Chenik, was found to be impressive. When the draft budget favorable to French interests against which Chenik pronounced an indictment was rejected by the Great Council, Bourguiba wrote that: "The Tunisian people will remember that the delegates of the Jewish community were interested in the fate of our fellahs (farmers) much more than certain Muslim agricultural delegates of Center and South. The Tunisia we intend to free will not be a Tunisia for Muslims, for Jewish or for Christians. It will be the Tunisia of all those who, without distinction of religion or race, would like to accredit for their country and live under the protection of equal laws." This statement will gradually become his doctrine, both modernist and secular.

=== The Tunisian naturalization issue ===
==== Leading the press campaign ====
With the economic crisis that worsened day after day, and the rising popularity acquired by Bourguiba and his friends, a new generation of nationalist leaders emerged. Preoccupied, they reckoned a good cause would be sufficient to revive the national movement on a new basis. In this context, the Tunisian naturalization issue presented itself as a motive for the movement's renewal. During the 1920s, the nationalists protested in force against the enactment of the December 20, 1923, law which favored access by non-French protectorate inhabitants to French citizenship. According to the colonial power, they had, at the time, to face the increase judged to be "too fast" of the Italian colony compared to insufficient metropolitan immigration.

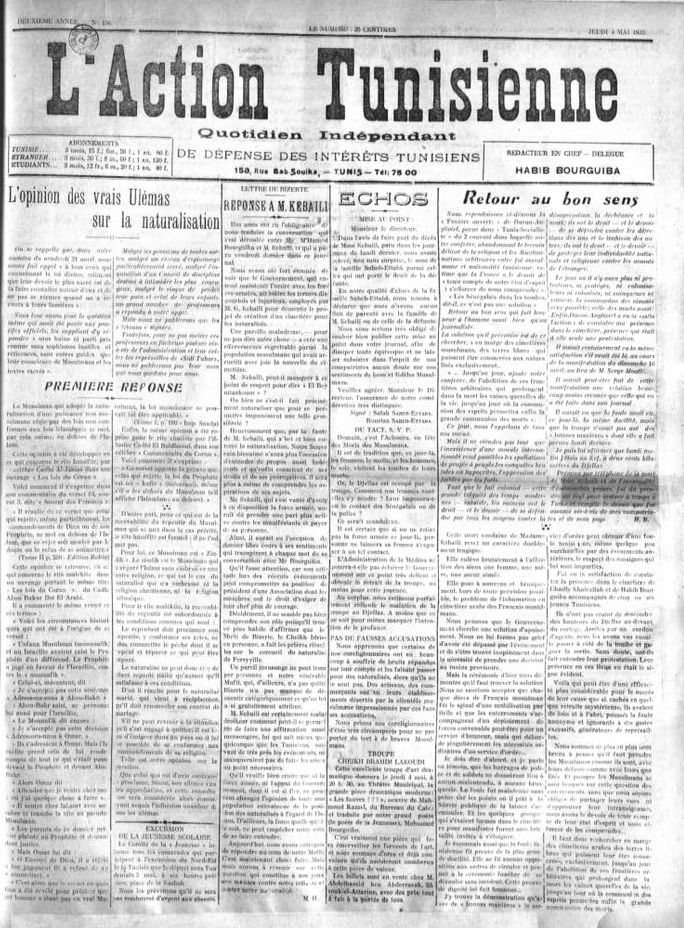
Front page of L'Action Tunisienne on May 4, 1933, regarding the press campaign opposed to French naturalization.

The hostility following the adoption of these measures receded gradually but resumed in the start of 1933. On December 31, 1932, upon the announcement of the death of a naturalized French Muslim living in Bizerte, Mohamed Chaabane, individuals gathered in the Muslim cemetery with the firm will to oppose the interment of the dead. They obtained the support of the city's mufti who delivered a fatwa affirming that as apostates naturalized can not be buried in Muslim cemeteries.

Bourguiba decided to react and started a press campaign, led by L'Action Tunisienne and partially reprised by all the nationalist newspapers: "We then embarked on a major campaign to combat this thesis [naturalization] whose any consequence was to inevitably lead to francisation all the Tunisian people. Citing a verse of the Qur'an, we developed the argument that, by ceasing to be amenable to the Sharaa Court, the naturalized French ipso facto lost his Muslim attributes", he declared in 1973. Italy, fearing a major naturalization of its citizens, brought a discreet but active support to Bourguiba, decided to discredit the French initiatives and build a reputation.

In order to stop the turmoil that worsened in the country every time a naturalized died, the Residence demanded a fatwa, in April, from the Sharaa Court of Tunis, the highest religious body of the protectorate. The Maliki and Hanafi sheikhs in charge of the case issued a sentence that solves nothing: They maintained the apostate status of a naturalized but said that if he repented, even verbally, before his death, burial in Muslim lands will be granted. This decision angered the nationalists while riots started in Kairouan and Tunis. Bourguiba denounced the duplicity of religious authorities, the provocations of the government, cast aspersions on naturalized and criticized the Destourian press whose "caution considered as the ultimate strategy seems overwhelmed". He invited the French people and Ahmad II Bey to intervene. Meanwhile, the Residence took a two-phased decision: Firstly, it yielded deciding that naturalized will be buried in special burial place, which appeared to be ghettos excluding them from the community. And secondly, François Manceron, resident-general at the time, enacted decrees judged "super-scoundrel" by Joachim Durel, granting him authority to imprison and arrest, at his will, any nationalist, also giving him the authority to suspend any newspaper or association "hostile to the Protectorate". Bourguiba commented this decision writing: "Repression comes too late. The atavistic fatalism of an oppressed people was shaken".

==== Rising popularity ====
Bourguiba's firm position increased his popularity among nationalists as he testified in 1973 saying:

The opportunity was huge, and I took it, to drum against the naturalization policy [...] I stuck only to the anathema on the French naturalized and the prohibition to bury them in Muslim cemeteries. So, I was campaigning in this direction. There was no question for me to admit the burial in a Muslim cemetery of a naturalized french [...] The people were very aware of the issue. I benefited from that to mobilize them [...] The event was a scandal and it acted in a salutary way on the mindset of the population. That was enough for me to give a definitive halt to the naturalization policy. We felt strongly embarrassed to be subject to scandal, and so much more when the protectorate authorities were pushing the precautionary measures to maintain the naturalized's graves under the spotlight, at night, in order to protect them from any profanation. Incidents on it were therefore multiplied throughout Tunisia, from North to South, East to West.

This victory led activists to request the convening of an extraordinary Destour. The event was held on May 12 and May 13, 1933, in Tunis at Mountain Street. Bourguiba made a speech criticizing the "outdated futile methods and the illusions of the leaders and their program that does not meet the aspirations of the people, who are therefore aware of his case". He also asked for "radical solutions, a tireless and energetic action unequivocally unnecessary or exclusively harmful to achieve independence within a union treaty with France, guaranteeing its legitimate interests and the interests of all the foreign colony." He noted that: "In order to do so, we must form a front to unite all the trends of the great Tunisian Constitutional Liberal Party." Successful in their press campaign, all of the L'Action Tunisienne team were elected unanimously as members of the executive committee of the Destour.

At the time, Bourguiba and his friends of L'Action Tunisienne saw the Destour as lacking firmness. Nevertheless, it developed an organization with 90 local representatives from throughout the country. It had not grown since the arrival of Manceron at the head of the Residence. Recruiting among lower classes as well as the bourgeois classes, the new distinction among the Destour permitted them to have a strong position and influence the party in order to unify all factions of the nationalist front. Responding to the wishes of Bourguiba, many delegates supported this union. However, in 1933, it was not yet Bourguiba but Mahmoud El Materi who appeared to be the leader of L'Action group. This man who proved himself to be an active man of science in the French communist party and ended up as a delegate during the Tours Congress. He expressed his will not to become a politician. As far as he was concerned, tolerance, the sense of honour, solidarity, spirit, and justice overrode tactics, cynicism, provocation, and low blows. His qualities and charisma allowed him to forge a strong position within the Destour in which he was unanimous.

==== Break with the Destour ====
Meanwhile, the turmoil over the naturalization issue continued in Tunis with riots that started in the countryside, affected by famine. The nationalist press thus multiplied its criticism towards the Residence, which had decided to prohibit teachers and students from attending certain lessons. It also forbade the movement of officials and suspended nationalist newspapers, including L'Action Tunisienne on May 31. In addition, the Destour party was banned. The French government feeling that Manceron acted too late to stand firm, replaced him with Marcel Peyrouton, on July 29, 1933. In this repressive context, Bourguiba was deprived of his means of expression and was a prisoner of the Destour structure that was willing to take back his autonomy.

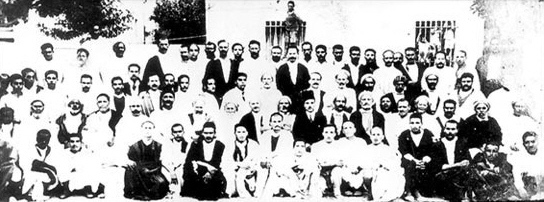
Habib Bourguiba leading the protest delegation.

On August 8, the opportunity to express himself was presented when incidents began in Monastir upon the forced interment in a Muslim cemetery of the son of a naturalized citizen. A fight erupted between the population and law enforcement, ending with one person dead and numerous injured. Bourguiba soon convinced Monastirian notables who were victims of police brutality, to choose him as their lawyer. On September 4, without informing the Destour of his initiative, Bourguiba led a protest delegation to the bey. They were welcomed by a man of confidence, who listened to their requests. Nevertheless, the party leadership, seeing in this the pretext to put a stop to activism that displeased them, decided to blame to the young nationalist: "It was he [Mahmoud El Materi] who announced me that a blame motion had been decided against me. I was outraged. Because my procedures at the head of this delegation protesting to the bey was not on the party's behalf, but on the behalf of a lawyer who intervened to defend his clients, all originating in Monastir, my birth city. Therefore, nothing justified this blame motion. My membership in the executive committee of the Destour should not prohibit me from other activity. Should it be so, there was no option left for me but to resign. Materi and the other members of L'Action Tunisienne wanted to do the same. But I dissuaded them, their presence in the executive committee could have been useful", he recalled years later.

Bourguiba, who thought the Destour and its leadership to be obstacles to his ambitions, decided to resign from the party on September 9. He soon learned from this experience. The success obtained thanks to popular violent uprisings shows the failure of Destourians' favorite methods, consisting of petitions and telegrams. Only violence by determined groups could lead the Residence to step back and negotiate political solutions. That would be his guideline until 1956.

== Notes and references ==
=== Cited bibliography ===
- Martel, Pierre-Albin (1999). Habib Bourguiba. Un homme, un siècle (in French). Paris: Éditions du Jaguar. ISBN 978-2-86950-320-5.
- Bessis, Sophie; Belhassen, Souhayr (2012). Bourguiba (in French). Tunis: Elyzad. ISBN 978-9973-58-044-3.
- Mestiri, Saïd (2011), Moncef Mestiri : aux sources du Destour (in French), Tunis: Sud Editions
- Casemajor, Roger (2009), L'action nationaliste en Tunisie (in French), Carthage: MC Editions

=== Further reading ===
- Said, Safi (2000), Bourguiba : une biographie quasi interdite (in Arabic), Beyrouth: Riad El Rayes Books
- Bourguiba, Habib (2016), Ma vie, mes idées, mon combat (in French), Tunis: Apollonia editions, ISBN 978-9973-827-90-6
- El Ganari, Ali (1985), Bourguiba. Le Combattant suprême (in French), Paris: Plon, ISBN 978-2-259-01321-5
- Rous, Jean (1984), Habib Bourguiba (in French), Paris: Martinsart, ISBN 978-2-86345-235-6
