= Tunisian naturalization issue =

- Part of the Tunisian national movement
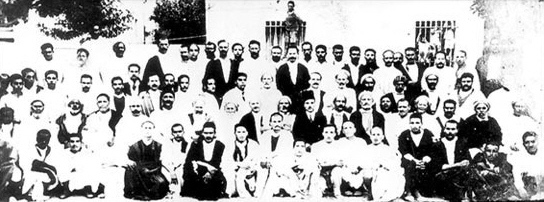
- Delegation led by Habib Bourguiba to protest after the attempted burial of a naturalized French citizen in Monastir
- Date: December 31, 1932 – August 7, 1933
- Location: Bizerte, Hammam Lif, Ferryville, Kairouan, Tunis and Monastir
- Caused by: Refusal to bury the French naturalized Muslims in Muslim cemeteries.
- Methods: Cemetery blockades Riots; Press campaign
- Result: Creation of special cemeteries Reviving Tunisian nationalism Decrease of naturalization requests

Parties
French protectorate administration	Tunisian national movement

Lead figures
François Manceron	Habib Bourguiba

Number
Many Naturalized French	Thousands

Casualties and losses
Many injured	Many injured 1 Dead

The Tunisian naturalization issue was a protest movement against French and Tunisian laws that eased access to French citizenship in 1933, during the French protectorate of Tunisia. It was active in preventing the burial of Muslim Tunisians who had adopted French nationality in Muslim cemeteries. These riots revived the Tunisian national movement, which had been weakened after the 1926-28 repression.

== Background ==
=== First naturalization laws ===
The first laws allowing Tunisians to obtain French citizenship were enacted in 1887, six years after the protectorate's establishment. The law of July 29, 1887, specified:

Article 1: May, after the age of twenty-one, be allowed to enjoy the rights of French citizens: the Tunisian subject who has served three years in the French army or navy, or who has performed duties or civilian jobs paid by the French Treasury.

Article 2: The three-year time limit is reduced to one year for the individuals mentioned in the previous article who have rendered France exceptional service.

Article 3: Will also be allowed to enjoy the rights of French citizens: the Tunisian subjects who, without having served in the armed forces or performed duties or civilian jobs paid by the French Treasury, render France exceptional service.

Article 4: The naturalization request is made to the civil controller of the district in which the applicant has established his residence. The civil controller shall automatically undertake a review of the history and character of the applicant [...] In each case, the results of the investigation, together with the request and supporting documents are sent to the Resident-general, who passes on the folder, with his reasoned opinion, to the Ministry of Foreign affairs.

This law was superseded without major amendments by the decrees of February 28, 1899, October 2, 1910, August 20, 1914, and November 8, 1921. The 1910 law extended the possibility of applying for naturalization only to Tunisian husbands of French women (with children), to holders of higher degrees (at that time, these could be earned only in France), and to those who had been deemed medically unfit to serve in the armed forces.

However, the reactions to the 1921 decree, which eased the access to French citizenship for foreigners (mostly Jews and Italians) born in Tunisia, were lively. Some Tunisian newspapers criticized this "attack on Tunisian citizenship" and argued that foreigners in Tunisia could be given Tunisian nationality. On the other hand, others found it normal for Christian foreigners born in Tunisia to seek French citizenship rather than Tunisian.

The first "official" opposition came from An-Nasir bey on April 8, 1922, when he threatened to abdicate if his 18 requests were not satisfied. The ninth point demanded the "absolute abolition of the Tunisian naturalization decree, both for those who have served in the army and for those who have not". However the Bey was soon compelled to withdraw his demands.

The number of naturalizations was, at the time, negligible:

- 1891-1898: 23 Jews
- 1899-1910: 101 Jews
- 1911-1919: 77 Muslims and 213 Jews
- 1920: 22 adults and 6 children, including 2 Jews
- 1921: 10 adults and 9 children, including 9 Jews
- 1922: 33 adults and 24 children, including 29 Jews
- 1923: 39 adults and 25 children, including 30 Jews

=== Law of December 20, 1923 ===
The concern of the French government about the size of the Italian population in Tunisia and the rise of fascism in Italy encouraged France to enact the law of December 20, 1923, easing access to French citizenship for Tunisians. Under these provisions, those who could apply for French citizenship were:

- Baccalaureate graduates of Sadiki College, of Émile-Loubet Vocational School, normal schools or holders of the Arab higher certificate
- Veterans of World War I or those who had a father or son who had died in the service, or three sons who had served and survived
- Tunisians who had worked for ten years in the French public administration or in a French business
- Tunisians who had at least five children in French schools
- Tunisians deemed to have "contributed to the French mission" in general

One of the first Tunisians to oppose the law was Tahar Haddad who feared the desertion of his countrymen interested in the material benefits of naturalization. On November 13, 1923, he denounced "the opening for naturalizations means, at the minimum, that France wants Tunisians to become French one day. Is this not enough to prove that the French government is eager to suppress the Tunisian nation and the state that represents it, a state that France is committed by treaty to respect and even to defend?"

The Destour party also tried to oppose this law by organizing a campaign of telegrams. Their attempts to secure condemnation by the religious authorities werevhow vet in vain. Habib Bey eventually signed the new law into effect, putting an end to their campaign, weakening the nationalist party.

=== Naturalizations following the 1923 law ===
The major beneficiaries of this law were Tunisian Jews, eager to escape the jurisdiction of Tunisian courts which essentially applied Islamic law. From the beginnings of the protectorate, many of them had elected to send their children to French schools. Thus, they now met the conditions for obtaining French citizenship. In 1924, 284 Jews applied for naturalization, as well as 62 Muslims. Between 1924 and 1930, the number of applicants increased to 5300 Jews and 1150 Muslims. Their motivations were mostly prosaic: almost all of the applicants were minor officials attracted by the so-called 'colonial third', whereby French citizens were paid a salary one third higher than that paid to Tunisians.

Lucien Saint, the Resident-General of France, who was the originator of this law, wanted to weaken the nationalist movement by attracting its better-educated members. However, he managed only to attract the sarcasm of the most racist colonialists, who mocked these new citizens who barely spoke French. When he left Tunisia on January 2, 1929, he did not know that he was leaving his successor François Manceron a time bomb that would re-animate the Tunisian national movement once again.

=== National movement of 1932 ===
The decrees enacted by Lucien Saint in 1926 led the members of Destour to act with discretion. The economic prosperity of the country in that period did not help them mobilize inhabitants. Waiting for more favourable conditions, they focused on setting up Destourian cells in the countryside and created numerous labor unions in each corporation. Literary, artistic and theatrical companies travelled the country in order to maintain the national sentiment. Nationalist newspapers in Arabic or French were also developing.

November 1, 1932, saw the publication of the first edition of L'Action Tunisienne managed by Habib Bourguiba, Mahmoud El Materi, Bahri Guiga, M'hamed Bourguiba, Tahar Sfar and Ali Bouhageb.

Soon, the effects of the Great Depression reached Tunisia and discontent grew in the country. These young nationalists felt that a good cause would be sufficient to revive the National movement on a new basis.

== Naturalized crisis ==
=== 1931 World Islamic Congress of Jerusalem ===
The nomination of Abdelaziz Thâalbi as a representative of Tunisia to the 1931 World Islamic Congress drew the attention of Tunisians to the conclusions of the meeting, including "the desperate struggle against the naturalization of Muslims in Islamic countries administered by France". The strong popularity of the Destourian leader in exile brought the naturalization issue to the fore once again, especially as the time was favorable to religious renewal, as may be seen from the motion of the Tunisian section of the Grand Council, in favor of Koranic schools and Ez-Zitouna University.

=== Burials ===
==== Bizerte burial ====
On December 31, 1932, upon the announcement of the death of a naturalized French muslim, Mohamed Chaabane, in Bizerte, individuals gathered in the Muslim cemetery with the firm intention of opposing his burial there. Rumors spread which led the city's Mufti, Idriss Cherif, to issue a Fatwa, justifying this refusal. In order to avoid bloodshed, his widow, a Catholic Frenchwoman, agreed to bury him in the European cemetery. On that same day, a spahi of Bizerte, also a naturalized French citizen, had to call the local authorities to intervene in order to bury one of his young sons in the Muslim cemetery.

All these acts were celebrated as a great victory by the nationalist media. L'Action Tunisienne started a newspaper campaign that caused violent protests in Hammam Lif, Ferryville and Kairouan.

==== Fatwa of Muhammad al-Tahir ibn Ashur ====
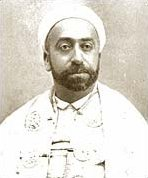
Portrait of Muhammad al-Tahir ibn Ashur.

In order to remove any ambiguity about burial rights, Resident-General François Manceron asked for Cheikh el Islam Muhammad al-Tahir ibn Ashur's advice, in April 1933. The fatwa issued by in response the "Sharaa" court was very ambiguous; it maintained that a Muslim who adopts the nationality of a non-Muslim country is an apostate, but added that if he repents, even verbally, before his death, his burial in Muslim cemeteries is acceptable. Learning of this maneuver, the Destourians denounced collusion between the French and the religious authorities. Manceron, therefore, informed the French minister of foreign affairs, Joseph Paul-Boncour, of his failure:

We had every reason to believe that the response of Sharaa would be affirmative and that it would therefore be likely to resolve this difficult issue, but some religious judges' indiscretions have caused the unrest that I point out. It is feared that, even if the legal advice is favorable, it cannot usefully serve us because the Destourians maintain that we lobbied the Sharaa and that such an opinion, not freely issued, has no value.

The Resident-General was not mistaken: When the new fatwa was confirmed, students of Ez-Zitouna started a strike and demanded the removal of its author. Their demand was successful on September 30, 1933.

==== Upsurge of protests ====
When rumors regarding the drafting of a fatwa favorable to the Residence spread, the representative of Constantine in the French chamber of deputies, Émile Morinaud, demanded that the Minister of Foreign Affairs accelerate the naturalization policy, on April 6.

On April 15 and April 16, 1933, unrest started in the Tunis neighbourhood of Halfaouine on the announcement of the death of Moussa Ben Saïd, a naturalized Frenchman. Law enforcement could not handle the turmoil and were replaced by Senegalese Tirailleurs who dealt with the insurrection. Calm was only restored when the protesters learned that Ben Said was alive.

On April 21, the Grand Vizier Hedi Lakhoua published a proclamation by which, Ahmad II bey, declaring himself as a defender of Muslim religion, asked his subjects for peace, defended Sharaa and warned troublemakers against the harmful aftermaths of their acts. His intervention had no effect, and to avoid riots, naturalized were buried in European cemeteries like in Kairouan, La Manouba, El Kef and Souk El Arba.

On May 1, the inhabitants of Tunis inhabitants started protests once again in order to stop the burial of Mrs Kebaïli, whose husband was the chairman of the Muslim League of France. The Resident-General yielded, days later, ordering the burial of French Muslims in specially designated cemeteries.

On August 7, bloodshed occurred in Monastir. Despite the Resident's decree forbidding the burial of naturalized French in Muslim cemeteries, Sousse's civil controller, André Graignic, forced the burial of a naturalized official's child, Abdesselem Essayadi. People decided to protest against this decision and soon violence was used: The crowd started throwing stones at the funeral oration while soldiers shot the protesters, leading to numerous injured and one dead, Chaabane El Bhouti nicknamed Kherfoucha. Following the events, Graignic and the caïd of Monastir were dismissed from their posts.

==== Distribution of an anonymous fatwa on May 4 ====
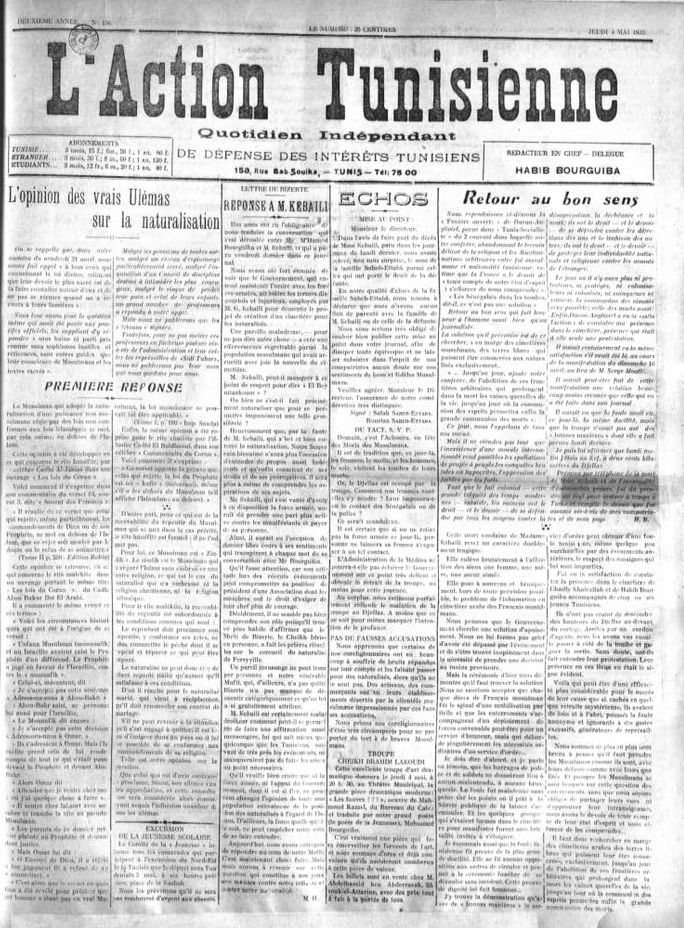
Frontpage of L'Action Tunisienne, on May 4, 1933.

To express his disagreement with al-Tahir ibn Ashur, Mohamed Bechir Naifer (1889-1974), imam in Ez-Zitouna Mosque, wrote a fatwa specifying that a Muslim seeking naturalization was considered to have renounced his faith. The fatwa also made clear the conditions of repentance so that a naturalized had the right to be buried in a Muslim cemetery. This fatwa was countersigned by his brother Ibrahim Naifer. In order to avoid reprisals against the writers of the text, it was copied and signed by Muhammed Salah Naifer (1902-1993) who transmitted it to L'Action Tunisienne journal.

The fatwa was published anonymously on May 4:

The Muslim who adopts the naturalization of a non-Muslim power governed by laws not conforming to Islamic law is considered, upon this act, as a non-Muslim [...]

Regarding the admissibility of repentance of the Muslim who puts himself in the above case, the Hanafi rite is categorical: it does not admit him [...]

For the Maliki rite, the admissibility of repentance is subject to known conditions that are:

The repentant must proclaim his repentance, therefore conform his actions, not commit the sin of which he repents and repair what can be repaired.

The naturalized can not be declared repentant (tâib) unless he meets these conditions.

Hence it results for the naturalized husband, who comes to repentance, that he must renew his marriage contract. If he cannot return to the situation that he has committed to leave, he is obliged to emigrate to a country where it is possible for him to comply with the commandments of his religion.

The absence of signatures was justified by the editors of the paper: "In order not to put these teachers in an awkward position towards the administration and avoid the retaliation of "Sidi Tahar," we will not publish their names that we keep for ourselves". However, Muhammed Salah Naifer was suspended from his duties, in the midst of May.

== Aftermath ==
=== Creation of special cemeteries ===
A decree enacted on May 6, 1933, established special cemeteries for naturalized French citizens. Civil controllers were responsible for the creation of these cemeteries in towns where the mood of the inhabitants made it necessary. These special cemeteries were known to common people as "carrion cemeteries". It was heartbreaking for those Muslims who could not be buried near their families. At least 70 sought to restore their Tunisian citizenship in their letters addressed to the Resident-General. In these letters, they begged him to "erase their French citizenship" and to give them back Tunisian citizenship so they could be buried with their dead and save their families from shame and despair. One of them, a retired peacekeeper in Kairouan wrote:

MERCY, MERCY, MERCY Minister for this misfortune that during all his life has only been sadness and pain [sic] MERCY, MERCY, MERCY minister for him who is considered as an enemy by his own descendants. And that old loyal heart will always remain friendly to France, his only love [...] Your obedient servant is begging you, begging you MERCY, MERCY, MERCY.

Tunisian socialists relayed these requests to Paris, but the government responded that "French citizenship cannot be lost unless the French government determines that it should deprive one who freely sought it".

=== Reviving Tunisian nationalism ===
The success of popular mobilization galvanized activists to such a point that they demanded the holding of an extraordinary Destour Congress, which took place on May 12 and May 13 in rue de la Montagne, Tunis. Successful in their press campaign, the entire group of L’Action Tunisienne was elected unanimously to the executive Destour committee.

The happiness did not last: On September 4, following a shooting in Monastir cemetery, Habib Bourguiba led a protest delegation of Monastirians to see Ahmed Bey. The members of the executive committee criticised him for taking this decision on his own, without informing them. Furious, Bourguiba resigned form the committee on September 9. This was the beginning of the split that led to the creation of the Neo Destour on March 2, 1934.
