= Le Renouveau =

Daily newspaper in Tunisia (1988–2011)

- Type: Daily newspaper
- Founder: Constitutional Democratic Rally
- Publisher: Dar El Amal
- Founded: 20 March 1988
- Ceased publication: 2011
- Language: French
- Headquarters: Tunis

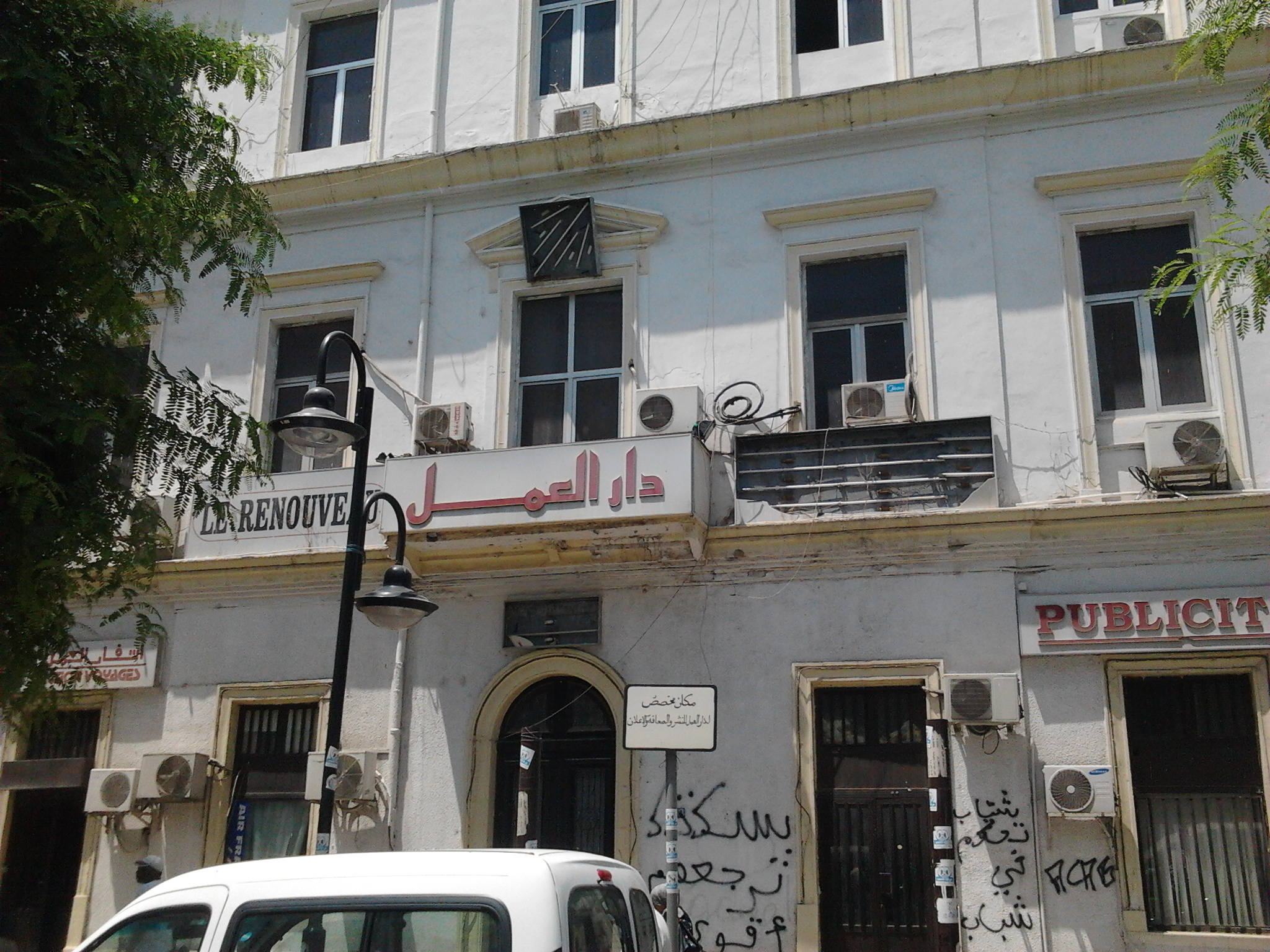
Le Renouveau building in Tunisia

Le Renouveau ("The Renewal") was a newspaper published in Tunis, Tunisia. It existed from 1988 to 2011 and was the official organ of the ruling party of Tunisia, Constitutional Democratic Rally (RCD).

== History and profile ==
Le Renouveau was first published on 20 March 1988 as a continuation of another French language daily L'Action which was one of the official media outlets of the now-defunct Neo-Destour Party. The publisher of Le Renouveau was Dar El Amal company and the paper was based in Tunis.

Le Renouveau was the organ of the ruling party, RCD, which was the successor the Neo-Destour Party. RCD also owned another newspaper entitled El Hurriya.

Mohamed Nejib Ouerghi served as the editor-in-chief of the paper. It frequently featured articles to legitimate the rule of the President Zine El Abidine Ben Ali. The paper ceased publication in 2011 following the removal of Ben Ali.

In 1985 the estimated circulation of the paper was 13,500 copies whereas it was 33,000 copies in 2003.
