= Dorra Bouzid =

Tunisian feminist and art critic (1933–2023)

Dorra Bouzid (Arabic: درة بوزيد; 1933 – 24 September 2023) was a Tunisian journalist, art critic, and feminist.

== Life ==
Dorra Bouzid was born in Sfax in 1933. After her father died, her mother Cherifa defied family expectations by moving to Nabeul in the early 1930s, riding a bicycle, teaching primary school and marrying the writer Mahmoud Messadi. Bouzid and her sister were educated at a French lycée.

In the late 1940s Bouzid studied at the École des Beaux-Arts in Tunis. However, her mother insisted she study pharmacy to be self-sufficient, and so she enrolled at the Faculty of Pharmacy in Paris in 1951. There she joined the North African Muslim Students Association, and helped organize a newspaper combining nationalism and syndicalism, before returning to Tunis to practice pharmacy.

The editor of the nationalist newspaper L'Action recruited Bouzid to write a women's column, which became a full page entitled "Feminine Action'. In 1955 she published there a 'Call for Emancipation Law' demanding full rights for women. The following year Habib Bourguiba promulgated the Code of Personal Status, modernizing the law with regard to women. In 1959 Bouzid co-founded with Safia Farhet and became the head editor of the feminist magazine Faiza, the first African Arab feminist magazine. In the early 1960s Dorra was sent by Bourguiba on an informal diplomatic mission to Morocco.

Bouzid was the subject of a 2012 documentary by Walid Tayaa, Dorra Bouzid, une Tunisienne, un combat.

== Death ==
Dorra Bouzid died in La Marsa on 24 September 2023, at the age of 90.

== Feminist Ideas ==
Dorra Bouzid argued that the advancement of women's rights did not threaten Islam; rather, it is religion that should adapt to the changes in society.

She advocated for the right to divorce as a tool of emancipation. She was fascinated by Habib Bourguiba, the first president of independent Tunisia, who worked towards equality between men and women in the Arab world and who also admired the journalist's articles.

== Published Works ==
- Ecole de Tunis: Un âge d'or de la peinture tunisienne, 1995
