= Ahmad II of Tunis =

Bey of Tunis (1862–1942)

Ahmad II
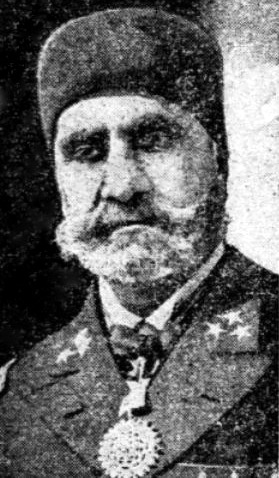

Bey of Tunis
- Reign: 13 February 1929 – 19 June 1942
- Predecessor: Muhammad VI al-Habib
- Successor: Muhammad VII al-Munsif
- Born: Ahmad II Bey; 13 April 1862; Dar al-Taj Palace, La Marsa, Kingdom of Tunisia
- Died: 19 June 1942 (aged 80); Dar al-Taj Palace, La Marsa, Kingdom of Tunisia
- Burial: Tourbet el Bey, Tunis, Tunisia
- Issue: Lalla Cherifa; Lalla Zohra; Abdelhamid Bey; Lalla Hanifa; Abdelaziz Bey; Lalla Kalsoum; Lalla Zeneïkha; Mokhtar Bey; Lalla Kabboura; Zine Abidine Bey; Lalla Essia; Mustapha Bey; Mohyeddine Bey; Mohamed El Taïeb Bey; Lalla Djemila; Mohamed KemalEddine Bey; Mohamed Ridha Bey; Mohamed Bourhaneddine Bey
- Dynasty: Husainides
- Father: Ali III ibn al-Husayn
- Religion: Islam

Ahmad II (Arabic: أحمد الثاني ; 13 April 1862 – 19 June 1942), commonly known as Ahmed II Bey (Arabic: أحمد باي الثاني), was the ruler of Tunisia from 11 February 1929 until his death. He was the son of Ali Muddat ibn al-Husayn.

He was born in the Dar al-Taj Palace at La Marsa. On 14 January 1928 he became the Bey al-Mahalla (Crown Prince) of Tunis, and thus the lieutenant-general of the Beylical Army, and became Bey upon the death of his cousin Muhammad VI al-Habib.

== International Eucharistic Congress ==
A year after his accession, in May 1930, an International Eucharistic Congress was convened in Carthage to celebrate the centenary of the French conquest of Algeria. It was the first such congress held in Africa, and the first in a Muslim-majority country. Ahmed Bey reluctantly agreed to serve as Honorary President of the Congress, which was partly paid for with 2 million francs worth of funds from the Tunisian government, raised in taxes on Tunisia's Muslim population. The event, with some participants dressed as Crusaders and others using it as a platform for speeches hostile to Islam, caused a furore in the Tunisian national movement. The nationalist newspaper La Voix du Tunisien ('The Tunisian Voice') called on the Bey to resign his Honorary Presidency and for other officials to dissociate themselves from the event and members of the Destour Party claimed that the Bey's involvement demonstrated his subservience to the French and abandonment of the defence of his people's interests.

== Vichy and the Jews of Tunisia ==
In 1940 the new Vichy regime in France led to the appointment of a new Resident General, Admiral Jean-Pierre Esteva who began pressing Ahmed Bey to implement Vichy anti-Jewish legislation. Article 9 of the French law of 3 October 1940 decreed that the anti-Jewish laws were applicable in the protectorate territories of the French Republic, including Tunisia.

The Bey made very limited efforts to resist these demands, but eventually signed a decree on 3 October 1940, which excluded Jews from the civil service and from professional roles connected to press, radio, theatre and cinema, while also allowing the publication of a 'Journal israélite de Tunisie' (Jewish Newspaper of Tunisia').

He also imposed a numerus clausus on the liberal professions, although it was never put into effect in some fields, including medicine, where instead Jews were forbidden from treating anyone other than other Jews.

Ahmed Bey signed another decree on 5 June 1941 dissolving Jewish youth groups, and a further one on 29 September 1941 dissolving the Jewish Community Council in Tunis and replacing it with an appointed body. His decree of 26 June 1941 ordered a census of the Jews.

Ahmad II of Tunis
- Royal Family of Tunisia

== Rise of nationalism ==
In the period of Ahmad's reign, the nationalist movement grew in political importance. The burials issue was particularly contentious, and the Neo Destour party was formed after the Ksar Hellal Congress in 1934.

== Death and succession ==
Ahmad died at La Marsa and was buried at the Tourbet el Bey. He was succeeded by his cousin Muhammad VII al-Munsif (Moncef Bey).

Ahmad II had ten sons and eight daughters, including Prince Muhammad al-Taib Bey (1902–1989) who was the head of the Husainid Dynasty from 1974 until 1989.

Preceded by Muhammad VI al-Habib	Bey of Tunis; 1929–1942	Succeeded by Muhammad VII al-Munsif
