= Hédi Saidi =

Tunisian politician and journalist (1897–1948)

Hédi Saïdi, born in 1897 in Tunis, Tunisia and died in 1948 in Cairo, Egypt, was a Tunisian politician and journalist.

== Early life ==
He was born into an old family of artisans in Tunis. He studied in France, became interested in politics.

== Career ==
He started his professional career at the end of the 1920s by combining with his brother Hamida to create the printing company The Union which, besides classical services, prints political magazines, inventories and booklets.

From 1934, Saïdi was the leader of the propaganda of Neo Destour and one of the pillars of the underground action of the party: it formed the "group of conflict", aimed by him and Béchir Zarg Layoun, within whom activists broke telephone and telegraph lines and distributed pamphlets calling to conflict.

In 1937, Saïdi founded Kol chay bel makchouf (Cards on the Table), a weekly magazine with a satirical political focus. The magazine was published through 1939.

He spent three years in prison before being liberated by the Germans who occupied Tunisia from the end of 1942. He then left Tunisia then and joined Habib Bourguiba in Cairo, on June 9, 1946, and died in 1948. Some streets in Tunisia still carry Saïdi's name.
