= Walid Tayaa =

Tunisian film director (born 1976)

- Born: 12 July 1976 (age 49); Tunis, Tunisia
- Occupation: Filmmaker
- Years active: 2006–present
- Notable work: El Icha

Walid Tayaa (born 12 July 1976) is a Tunisian film director.

== Career ==
He studied sociology and then started to make films. He directed a few amateur short films, before realizing his first professional short film Madame Bahja in 2006, which was screened at the Cannes Film Festival. Afterwards, he participated in writing workshops with the French film director Ève Deboise and released more short films. His short film El Icha won the Grand Prize at the Festival du Cinéma Méditerranéen de Tétouan.

The short film Boulitik in 2011 depicted different moments of the Tunisian Revolution and deals with LGBT rights in Tunisia. He was one of the few people who supported the foundation of the LGBT organisation Association Shams in 2015 in public.

In 2013 he shot a documentary about the Tunisian feminist Dorra Bouzid. Fataria in 2017 was his first feature film.

== Filmography ==
- 2006: Madame Bahja
- 2009: El Icha (Vivre)
- 2010: Ena el Issaoui
- 2010: Prestige
- 2011: Boulitik
- 2012: Journal d'un citoyen ordinnaire
- 2013: Dora Bouzid, première journaliste tunisienne, une femme un combat
- 2014: El Kef
- 2015: Café Sidi amara Halfaouine
- 2016: Embouteillage
- 2017: Fataria
