= El Icha =

- Directed by: Walid Tayaa
- Screenplay by: Walid Tayaa
- Produced by: Ulysson
- Starring: Sonsdos Belhassan; Nabiha Ben Miled; Dalanda Abdou; Dalanda Ben Kilani; Mourad Karrout
- Cinematography: Nabil Saïdi
- Edited by: Imen Jibéri
- Release date: 2010
- Running time: 17'
- Country: Tunisia

El Icha (Life) is a 2010 film from Tunisia.

== Synopsis ==
Havet is a Tunisian woman of some forty years. She is a widow and has a twenty-year-old son who has emigrated to Canada. She lives with her mother in a working-class neighborhood in Tunis and works as a telemarketing operator for a French company installed in Tunis. Each morning, she leaves for work, sinking deeper and deeper into suffocating routine. At home, her life is monotonous and of no interest.

== Awards ==
- Festival de Cine Mediterráneo de Tetuán 2010
