= Bahri Guiga =

Tunisian lawyer and politician (1904–1995)

- البحري ڤيڤة
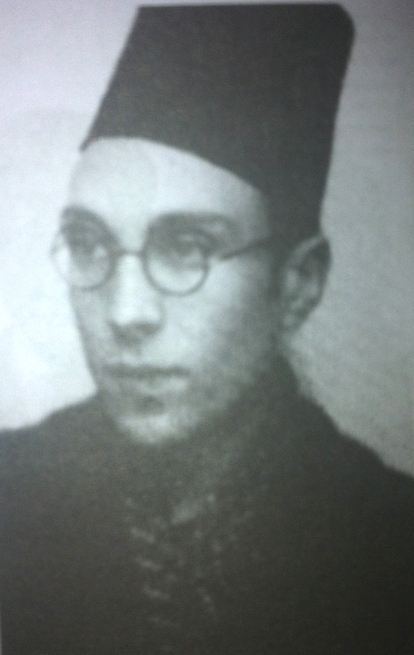

Personal details
- Born: March 4, 1904 Testour, Regency of Tunisia
- Died: September 2, 1995 (aged 91)
- Citizenship: Tunisian
- Party: Neo Destour
- Education: Paris Institute of Political Studies
- Occupation: Lawyer, politician

Bahri Guiga (March 4, 1904 - September 2, 1995) was a Tunisian lawyer and politician.

== Biography ==
Originating in the Berber village of Takrouna, he studied in Lycée Carnot de Tunis along with Habib Bourguiba who was his best friend. He pursued his law studies in Paris Law School. His doctoral thesis is titled as "The evolution of sharaa and its judicial enforcement in Tunisia".

In 1928, he obtained his Paris Institute of Political Studies diploma, in the public finance section.

In 1932, he was one of the founders of L'Action Tunisienne newspaper along with Habib Bourguiba, Tahar Sfar and Mahmoud El Materi.

In 1934, he organized with L'Action team the Ksar Hellal Congress which ended with the creation of the Neo Destour party, on March 2, 1934. Therefore, he became treasurer in the first political office, the leadership organ of the party.

From 1971 to 1979, he was a member of the International Commission of Jurists (ICJ).

Son of Hamouda Guiga, Bahri Guiga was the nephew of the writer Abderrahman Guiga and the uncle of Tahar Guiga, author of numerous novels in Arabic and Driss Guiga, Tunisian minister of health then education and interior, who will join his lawyer cabinet.

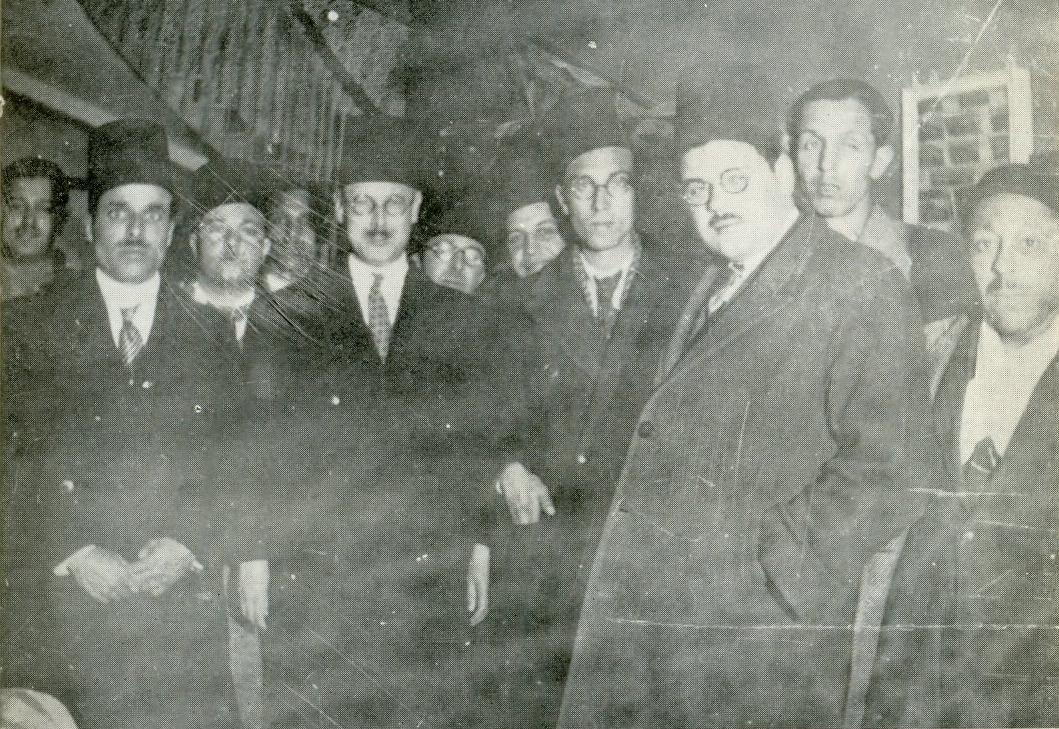
The founding members of the Neo Destour.

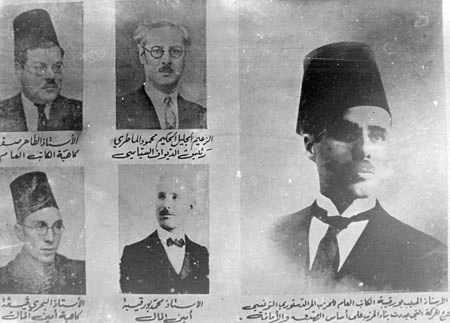
First Neo Destour leadership.
