= Salah Farhat =

Tunisian politician

Salah Farhat صالح فرحات
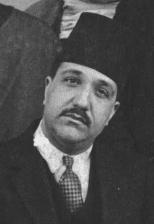
- Salah Farhat

Personal details
- Born: July 26, 1894 Manouba, Tunisia
- Died: March 18, 1979 (aged 84) Le Kram, Tunisia

Salah Farhat (Arabic: صالح فرحات; July 26, 1894 – March 18, 1979) was a Tunisian politician who was a founder of the Constitutional Liberal Party (Destour) after having campaigned in the Young Tunisians Movement.

He was active in the struggle for independence and retired from politics once Independence was achieved. He also was a poet of french expression.

== Early life and education ==
Farhat was born on July 26, 1894, at the Palais de Kobbet Ennehas in Manouba, a suburb of Tunis. He comes from a rich Mameluk family of Greek origin.

Farhat enrolled high school Carnot in Tunis where he passed the French baccalauréat in 1914; he also took Arabic lessons at the University of Ez-Zitouna. He obtained a law degree from the Faculty of Algiers in 1917.

Farhat worked as an interpreter until war at the Bar of Tunis in 1919.

Farhat specialized in land law, to safeguard Tunisian agricultural property against colonization, and in criminal law, to defend the causes of nationalists.

== Political career ==
In 1921, he was an elected member of the Executive Office of Destour in its Party's Legal Commission who campaigned for the benefit of the Turkish Red Crescent by raising funds and aid.

In 1922, Farhat and Destour were accused of carrying out an anti-French political campaign by reconciling Destourian principles with communist claims. He formally denies any link between Destour and communism in several newspaper articles.

In 1923, at the departure of Abdelaziz Thâalbi, founder of Destour, in exile, Farhat became deputy for Ahmed Safi as secretary general.

On May 11, 1924, Destour decides to send Farhat, its Deputy Secretary General to France. This decision comes after the victory of the left in the French elections. He would congratulate the elected members of the Cartel des Gauches and the president of the Radical Party, Edouard Herriot, to expose Tunisian claims and prepare the ground for sending a new delegation to France.

In the end of 1924, Farhat was part of the 3rd Tunisian delegation responsible for defending Tunisian claims in Paris to the French Government. The delegation is composed of Secretary General of Destour and head of the delegation Master Ahmed Safi, Deputy Secretary General Salah Farhat, and Taoufik Madani. Master Taieb Jémaïl is dismissed because the French Government accused him of colluding with Communists and double talk between the Arab press which is virulent in its attacks against colonialism and the French-speaking press.

The colonial authorities tried several times to remove him from the Bar which would end his professional and political career; thus make it more difficult for the Party of Destour.

After the split of Destour and the creation of the Neo Destour in 1934, Farhat was appointed to a commission to safeguard the unity of the party; all his efforts and those of Destour were in vain.

In 1935, after the death of Ahmed Safi, Farhat was elected Secretary General of Destour, and later the president of Destour.

He seconded Thâalbi upon his return to Tunisia in 1937 for the reunification of the national movement and the formation of a common front against colonialism.

During World War II and the occupation of Tunisia by Axis troops, Farhat was appointed Minister of Justice to his highness Moncef Bey, who formed an independent government from all the political tendencies of the country; the first Ministry Chenik of it was from January 1, 1943, to May 14, 1943.

Farhat and the other ministers resign from the independent government after the liberation of Tunisia by the Allies, the dismissal of Moncef Bey by General Giraud, and his exile in Laghouat in the south of Algeria. Immediately, a movement for the return of Bey on his throne, known as moncefism, is constituted. It unifies all the political tendencies of the country and Tunisian people for the defense of Moncef Bey, who was accused of, without foundation, being against the Allies and for the Axis powers; he never ceased to assert Tunisia's neutrality when France only criticizes him in reality for his independence from protectorate authorities.

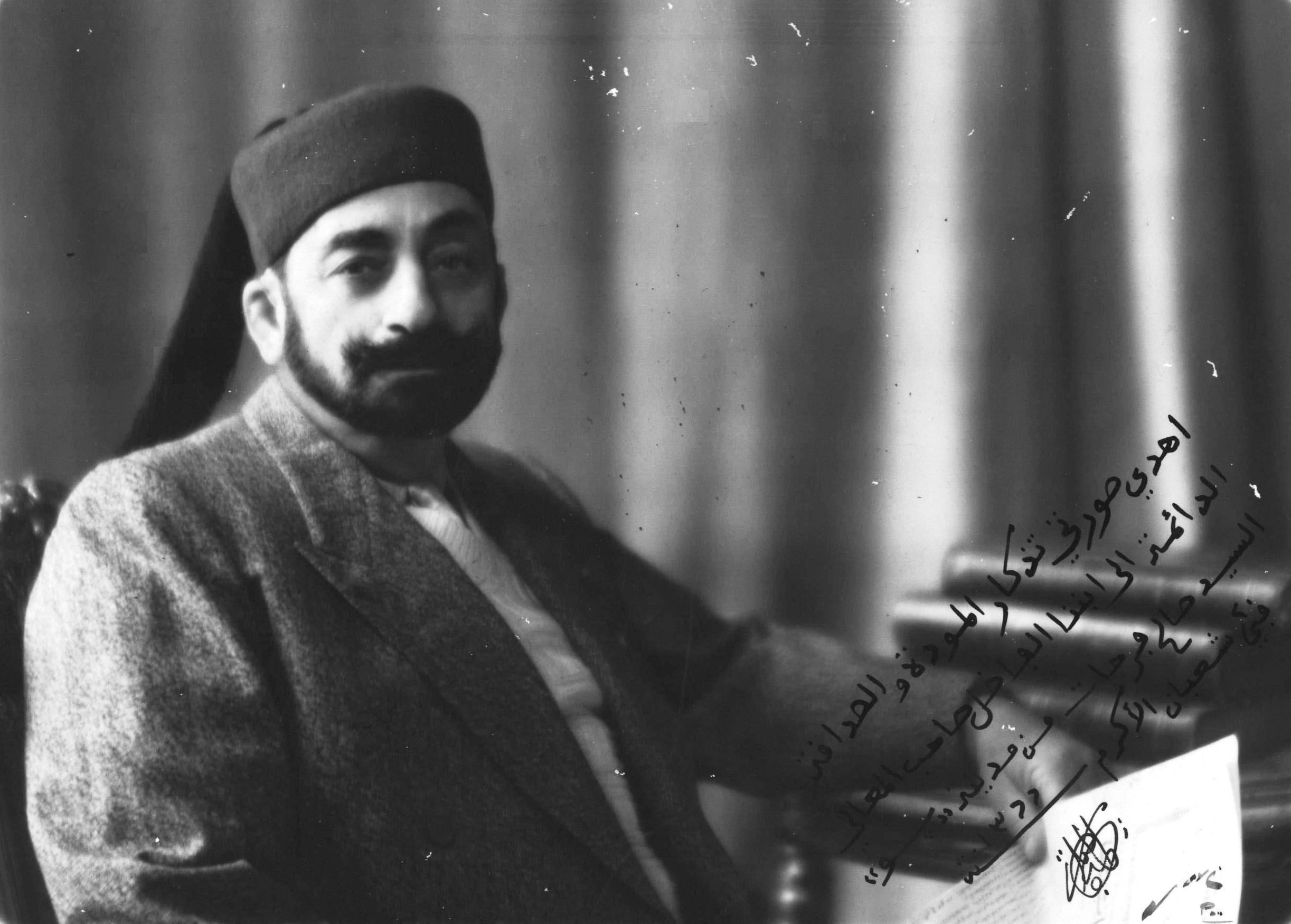
Signed photo of Moncef Bey to Salah Farhat in June 1947

Farhat supported his interventions, visits, letters, articles, and telegrams of protest, Moncéfisme and this Bey patriot and martyr during his exile from May 14, 1943, to September 1, 1948, the date of his death in Pau, France. Aware of his unwavering loyalty and his veneration for his person, Moncef Bey maintained numerous correspondence with Farhat approving his struggle, encouraging him in the defense of Monasticism and recommending him to work for national unity against colonialism.

After the death of Sheikh Thaalbi in 1944, Farhat became the leader of Destour.

On October 30, 1944, 17 Tunisian personalities, including Farhat, representing the different nationalist tendencies signed the Tunisian Charter. It constitutes the basis of the National Front which united these different tendencies after the end of the World War II.

On August 23, 1946, during the Night of Destiny Congress, of which Farhat was the instigator, a common front formed between all political tendencies and in particular between Secretary General of Vieux Destour Salah Farhat and Secretary General of Néo Destour Salah Ben Youssef claims total independence; the occupying forces interrupt the meeting and arrest the two leaders with a large number of political leaders whom they imprison at the Civil Prison of Tunis. Farhat and other nationalists were imprisoned for a month.

After the Night of Destiny Congress, Farhat plays a role in the reunification of the two destinies in the absence of Bourguiba.

After certain reforms and promises from the colonial authorities, Farhat continues his uncompromising fight by defending public freedoms and demanding total independence without accepting any of the proposed government responsibilities.

In 1947, for the constitution of a Tunisian Government, Farhat refused to believe that there was no guarantee of achieving independence; in 1951, he reiterated his refusal to be part of the new team, the second Chénik Ministry for the same reasons.

On October 31, 1951, Tunisia presented an official memorandum to France claiming internal autonomy. The response of the French Government was delayed until December 15, 1951, resulting in a categorical refusal of the Tunisian claims.

The breakdown of the dialogue by France is accompanied by a stiffening of the protectorate authorities. The appointment of Jean de Hautecloque as the new General Resident who arrives in the midst of a large military deployment heralds a change of perspective in Franco-Tunisian relations. France opts for force and dismisses any negotiated solution. 1952 was a dark year for Tunisia. General Garbey, Superior Commander of the Tunisian Troops, responded to the incidents in the Sahel with the sweep of Cap Bon; it resulted in more than 200 dead and hundreds of wounded and prisoners. Persevering in the politics of force, the General Resident dismisses the second Chenik Government and tries to isolate Lamine Bey, without succeeding completely thanks to the support of a committee of forty Tunisian personalities of all political tendencies, including Farhat.

At the end of the same year, the French terrorist organization Red Hand in Tunisia assassinated the trade union leader Farhat Hached.

The use of excessive force by colonial authorities led to a vigorous reaction from Tunisian people. The institution of armed struggle in Tunisia and a complaint against France to the UN Security Council.

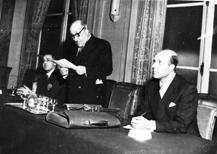
Speech in Paris, on the occasion of Tunisia's complaint to the UN in 1952, accompanied by Me Taabouri (left) and Ahmed Ben Miled (right)

Farhat faces these irresponsible actions of the protectorate authorities; he denounces their actions in the press.

In 1952 he moved to Paris with several members of the Vieux Destour to sensitize the various delegations of Arab, Muslim, and non-aligned countries to the Tunisian cause and draw their attention to the complaint brought by Tunisia against France to the United Nations.

In 1954, during the armed struggle, his villa in Le Kram was plasticized by the Red Hand, a French terrorist organization in Tunisia, like those of many political figures.

In 1955, Farhat opposed the talks on internal autonomy and the Franco-Tunisian Conventions which risk linking the fate of Tunisia to that of France, and including it with the French Union affirms again that the only acceptable claim is the country's total independence.

After the independence of Tunisia, declared faster than expected on March 20, 1956, Farhat declines any governmental responsibility that is proposed to him in a personal capacity, and does not include any member of the old Destour who fought so much for independence, and finally renounces any political activity.

For his selflessness and his long relentless struggle, he received the highest distinctions in his country.

== Political philosophy ==
Farhat actively participates in the political life of the country through direct contacts with grassroots activists, unions, and workers by creating destourian cells in the most remote regions of the country. Journalist and party theorist he defines the guiding principles of Destour through his numerous patriotic writings in the French press.

Destour's political, social, and union demands are made through direct contact with France and a dialogue with the socialists and colonial authorities, based on respect for treaties, international law and the policy of non-violence. Farhat is loyal to the Destour program and the stage policy launched by his predecessors, and will remain loyal to him when he takes over the leadership of the party. Any claim or action by the party must aim at a final goal, which is that the independence of Tunisia must be guaranteed in writing and fixed at a specific date.

== Personal life ==
On September 18, 1926, Farhat married Kalthoum Khaznadar, sister of Chédly Khaznadar, a nationalist poet and one of the tenors of Destour.

A poet of French expression since his adolescence he published in local newspapers and especially in the Revue "Leïla" (1936–1941) certain poems under the pseudonym Skander. His poems are admired by Tunisian foreign literary and artistic circles which he frequented assiduously.

In 1978, he published a collection of poems entitled "Songs of love" where patriotism, love of neighbor, and the spirit of conciliation are always present.

== Death ==
He died at the age of 84, on March 18, 1979, in his villa in the Kram and rests in the cemetery of Sidi Abdelaziz in La Marsa, facing the sea.
