= Tahar Sfar =

Tunisian lawyer and politician

- الطاهر صفر
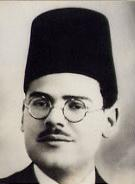
- Tahar Sfar in 1929.

Personal details
- Born: November 15, 1903 Mahdia, French Tunisia
- Died: August 9, 1942 (aged 38)
- Citizenship: Tunisian
- Party: Neo Destour
- Spouse: Salha Sfar
- Children: Rachid Sfar (son)
- Education: Paris Institute of Political Studies
- Occupation: Lawyer, Politician

Tahar Sfar (November 15, 1903 – August 9, 1942) was a Tunisian lawyer and politician.

== Early life and education ==
Sfar studied brilliantly in College Sadiki before enrolling himself in Lycée Carnot of Tunis. After obtaining his baccalaureate, he was proposed the management and reform of the school of El Arfania, in Tunis. He went to Paris in October 1925 to study law, Literature and political science. There, he found his friends from Sadiki such as Habib Bourguiba, Mahmoud El Materi, Bahri Guiga, Mustapha Baffoun and Sadok Boussofara.

Among his French classmates in Law school was the future French Prime Minister Edgar Faure. Indeed, Faure testified in his memoirs that during the first meeting he had with Habib Bourguiba in April 1955, he started recalling his student memories in Paris and wrote: "I told him about his compatriot Tahar Sfar who collected awards in the end of year contest where I collected honorable accessits...".

Furthermore, Sfar also created, in the end of 1927, with a group of Tunisian, Algerian and Moroccan student fellows, the Muslim Students Association of North Africa, in which he became the first vice-president.

== Nationalist activist ==
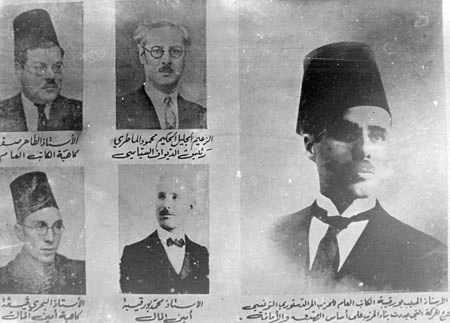
First Neo Destour leadership.

He returned to Tunis in 1928 to start working as a lawyer in parallel with numerous other activities: Political economy lessons in El-Khaldounia and writing newspaper articles in Arabic or French, such as La Voix du Tunisien and L'Action Tunisienne, which he founded with Bourguiba, El Materi and Guiga, in 1932. He also was active in struggling for independence, among the Destour party then created the Neo Destour with L'Action team, during the Ksar Hellal Congress of March 2, 1932.

The new party wanted itself to be modernist in its methods and organization, but at the same time, educator and mobilizer of the low classes for a better awareness of the need to rid the country of colonialism. Sfar was a great friend of Bourguiba, with whom he liked discussing philosophy, his passionate subject. Sfar greatly admired Mohandas Karamchand Gandhi and, just like him, advocated for nonviolence. The Neo Destour activists often referred to him as the philosopher of the party.

== Imprisonment ==
In January 1935, Sfar was removed under house arrest in Zarzis, in the Tunisian south, along with Guiga and Salah Ben Youssef. Thus, they joined their Neo Destour mates, taken away in the South since the September 1934 colonial repression. Sfar benefited from his isolation to study law and literature and also write a sort of journal, published in 1960, after his death, titled "Journal of an exiled" with a preface by André Demeerseman, manager of Ibla newspaper in Tunis. Demeerseman attended some of Tahar Sfar's political economy classes in El-Khaldounia, at the beginnings of 1930s.

After the arrival of Armand Guillon, the new resident-general of France in Tunisia, Sfar was freed in April 1936 at the same time as the other members of the party leadership. The negotiations between Guillon and the nationalists proved to be ephemeral. Sfar was imprisoned after the 1938 political crisis, even though he was part, at the time, of the party's moderates. At the end of April 1939, he left prison with serious health problems and died on August 9, 1942. Before he died, Sfar published in the French feminist journal Leïla of December 1939 an article strongly denouncing Adolf Hitler's regime and explaining the danger that he represented for humanity. This article was titled "The racist concepts of Hitler". At the end of this article and after introducing readers to some significant quotations of Mein Kampf, he ended his critical analysis with the following conclusion:

These few quotations are sufficient to show to what degree Hitler's hatred for other races other than the German race had reached. How he borrows unduly to Nietzsche his theory of "superhuman" (Übermensch) to make it that of the "master people", the chosen race, predestined to govern the universe and bend the entire humanity under its oppressor yoke, how he makes of violence a doctrine destined to govern the relations between the people; It is the regime of perpetual war, insecurity and guerrilla, like that which once existed between clans and tribes and that the constitution of peoples in states, the creation of strong central powers helped remove. If such plans were realized, it is the end of civilization; it is the end of progress, but we can predict for sure, the failure of such an attempt; because humanity follows, in general, a line of evolution that no force in the world can or could divert its course; and all institutions, like the "German family" who oppose this evolution are assured of a fast and certain disappearance.

== Political positions ==
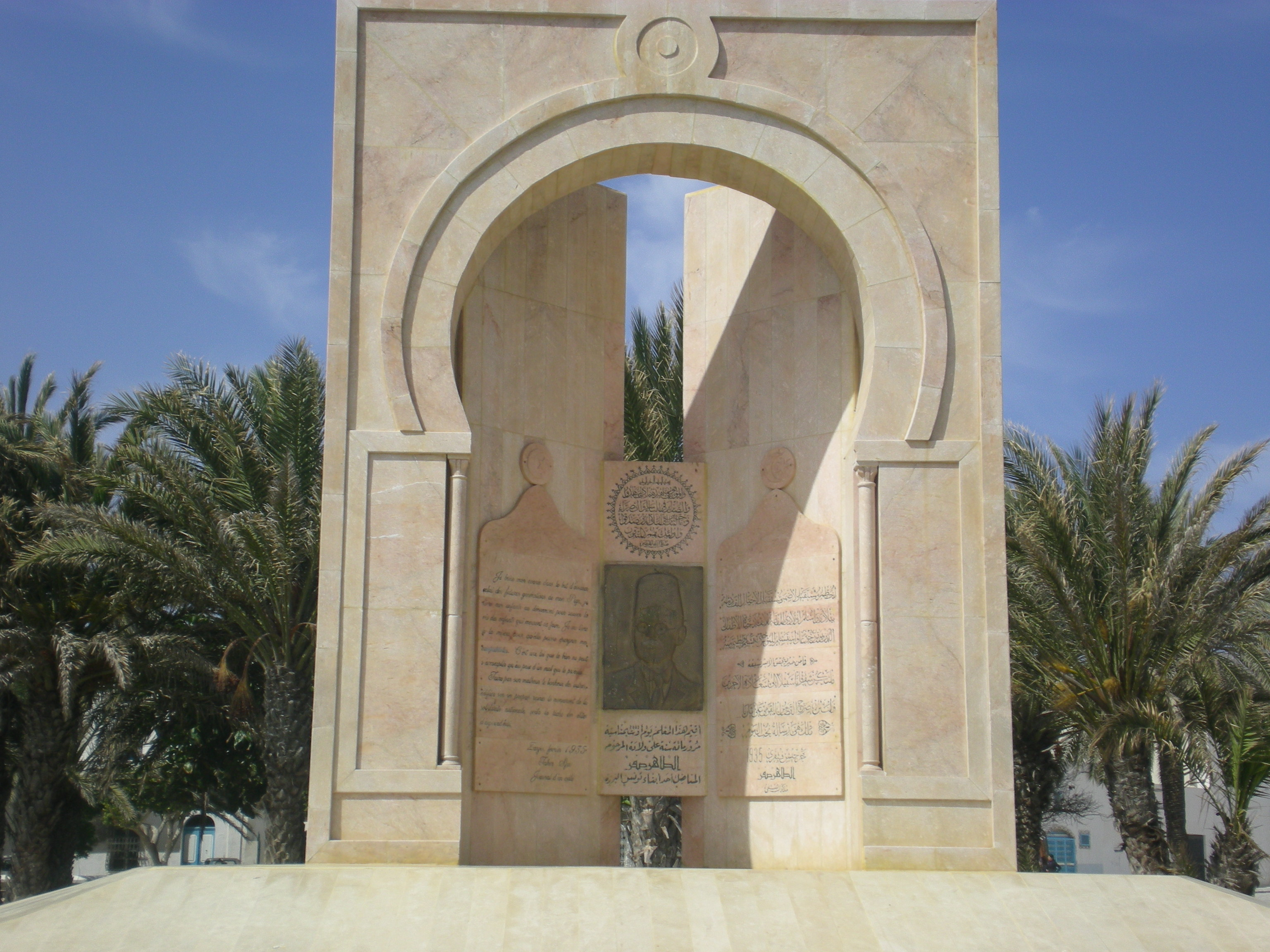
Tahar Sfar mausoleum in Mahdia.

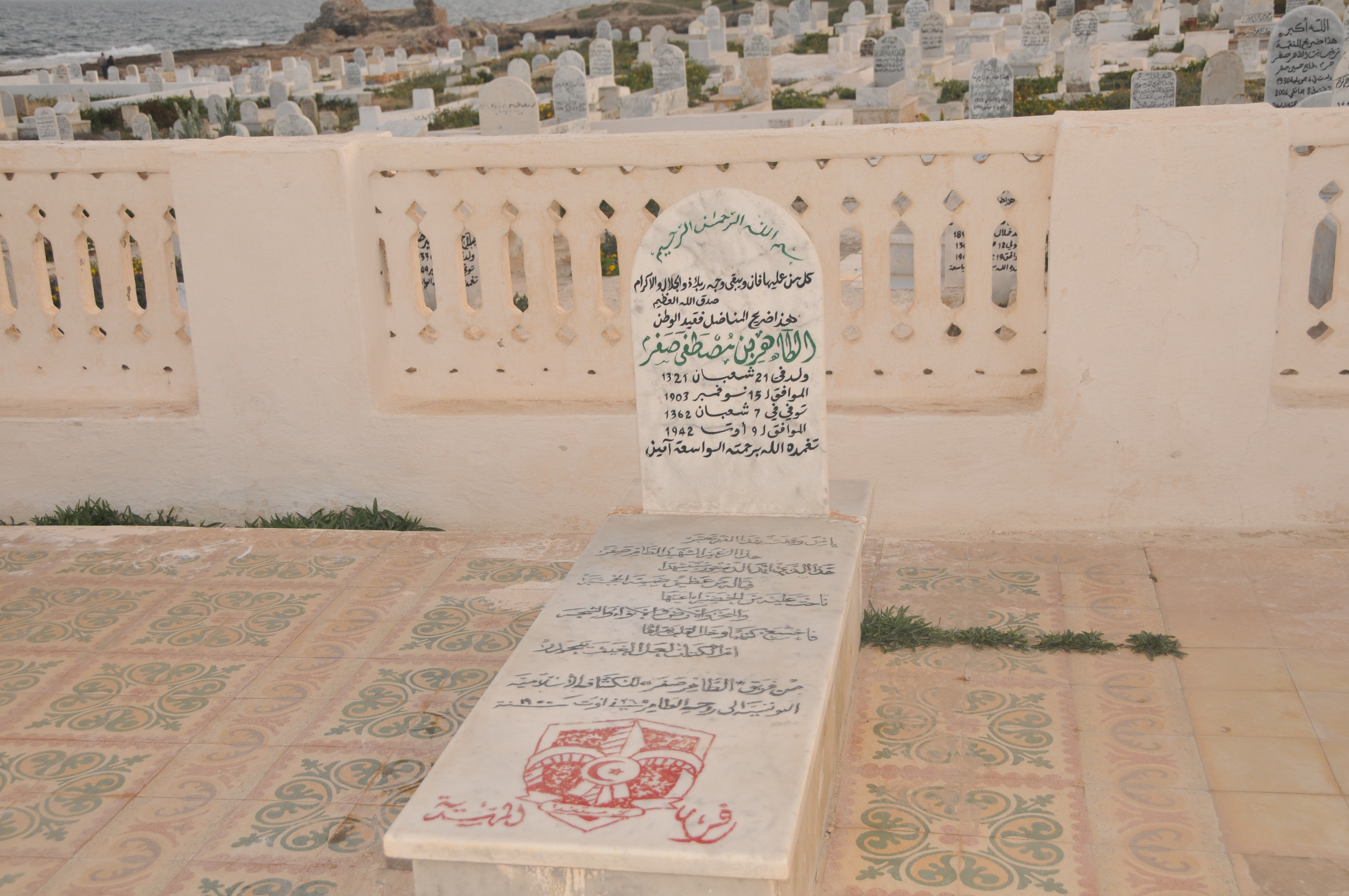
Tomb of Sfar in the cemetery in Mahdia.

Struggling for the independence of his country, Tahar Sfar also advocated for a real cooperation between the Eastern and Western world, as he wrote in the early 1930s: "Peace in the future, progress of the entire humanity depend on this union, this narrow collaboration between East and West, who, instead of turning their backs on themselves, ignore themselves, ought, on the contrary, support each other, provide mutual aid and cooperation for the rehabilitation of the fate of humanity.

In an article published by Leïla magazine in January 1941 and titled "What is a civilization?", Sfar developed his own definition of civilization and concluded by writing:

In consequence, we cannot say that a civilization, above all a great civilization, is good or bad in itself at any moment of human history, that it produces good and happy results or that it carries with it negative consequences for humanity, that it provides happiness or misfortune for individuals; the concepts of good and evil should be mostly excluded: a civilization, is a whole with its intrinsic and specific characteristics, with its good and bad sides, with what it encompasses of advantages and disadvantages, with, in short, all inseparable elements of which it is composed [...] We cannot deny the existence of an ongoing progress within humanity; When we observe things from top, exclude the examination of details, it is easy to recognize through history, the existence of an evolutionary line which we can determine its sense and direction, in the material domain as well as the moral one. But for this progress to be real, it is unfortunately a slow process, nearly hopeless.

== Family ==
Tahar Sfar was the son of Mustapha Sfar, a notary in Mahdia. Tahar Sfar married a cousin, Salha Sfar, daughter of the notary Mohamed Sfar, in 1929. He had three children: two daughters, Zeineb and Najet, and a son, Rachid Sfar, future Prime minister of Tunisia under Habib Bourguiba, from 1986–87.

== Bibliography ==
=== In French ===
- Khaled Abid, Tahar Sfar le militant, éd. Institut supérieur de l'histoire du mouvement national, Tunis, 2003
- André Demeerseman, « Tahar Sfar », Ibla, 1960, p. 139-149
- André Demeerseman, Là-bas... à Zarzis et maintenant, éd. Maison tunisienne de l'édition, Tunis, 1969
- Youssef Remadi, Tahar Sfar. Le leader et le penseur, fils de Mahdia, éd. El Bustan, Tunis, 2007
- Tahar Sfar, Journal d'un exilé, éd. Bouslama, Tunis, 1960
- Hassen Sioud, Tahar Sfar. Le militant et le penseur, éd. Imprimerie El Hilal, 1982
- Abdelhafid Zouari, Tahar Sfar, le penseur, éd. Imprimerie El Alam, Sousse, 2004
