= Cherifa Messadi =

Tunisian trade unionist and activist

Cherifa Messadi (Arabic: شريفة المسعدي; 1908 – 20 July 1990) was a Tunisian trade union leader. She was the first woman to become a union leader in the Arab world. Her daughter, Dorra Bouzid, was a prominent journalist, art critic, and feminist.
