= Muhammad VI al-Habib =

Bey of Tunis from 1922 to 1929

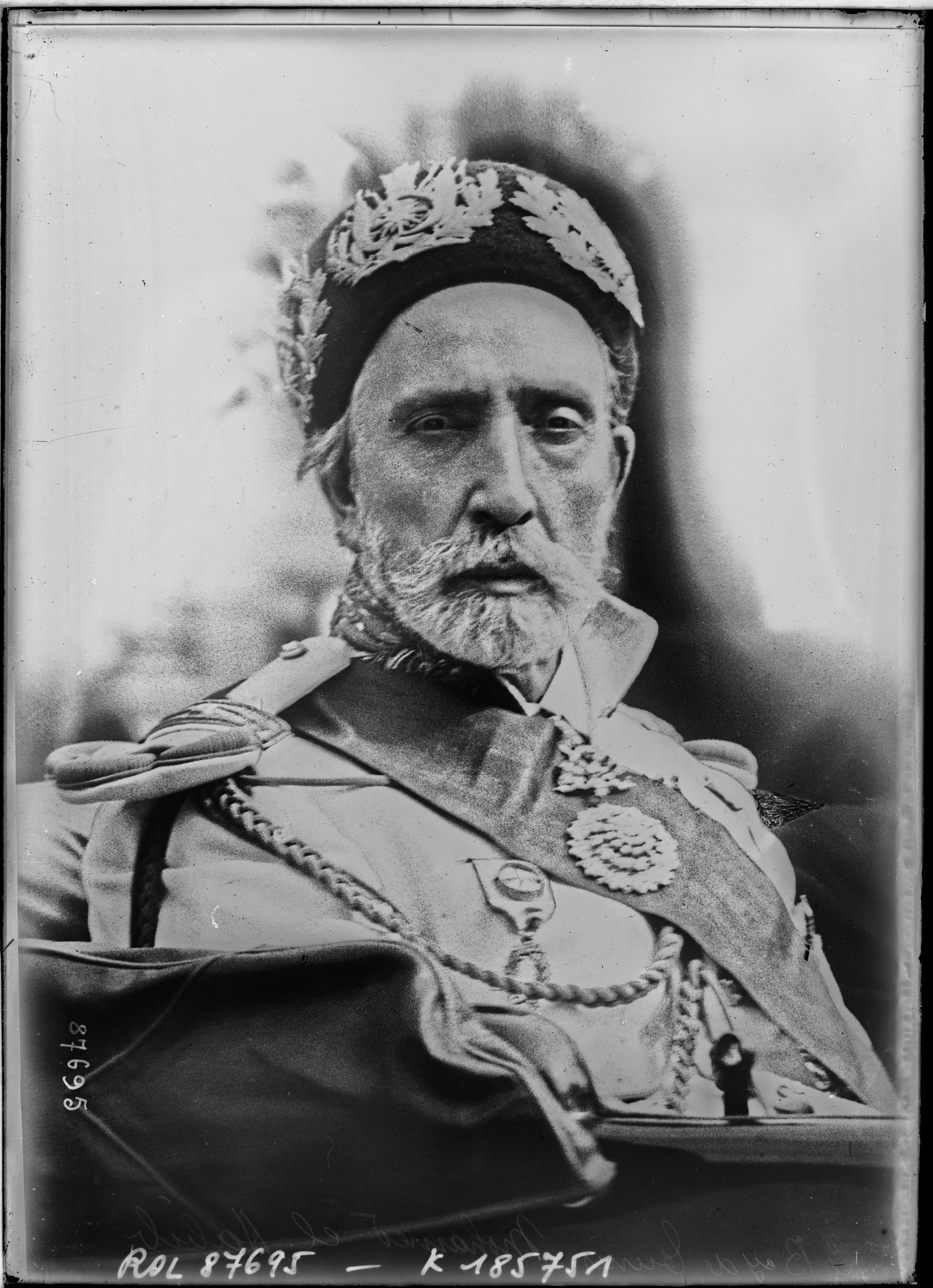
- Muhammad VI in 1923

Bey of Tunis
- Reign: 8 July 1922 – 13 February 1929
- Predecessor: Muhammad V an-Nasir
- Successor: Ahmad II of Tunis
- Born: Muhammad VI al-Habib Bey; 13 August 1858; Le Bardo, Kingdom of Tunisia
- Died: 13 February 1929 (aged 70); Zarrouk Palace, Carthage, Kingdom of Tunisia
- Burial: Tourbet el Bey, Tunis, Tunisia
- Issue: Muhammad al-Amin; Sidi Mohamed; Azzedine Bey; Sidi Mohamed Salah Bey; Lalla Hallouma; Lalla Fatima
- Dynasty: Husainides
- Father: Sidi Mohamed el-Mamoune Bey
- Religion: Islam

Muhammad VI al-Habib (Arabic: محمد السادس الحبيب), commonly known as Habib Bey (Arabic: الحبيب باي ; 13 August 1858 in Le Bardo – 13 February 1929 in Carthage) was the sixteenth Husainid Bey of Tunis, reigning from 10 July 1922 until 11 February 1929.

His father was Mohamed el-Mamoune Bey, the younger child of Hassine II Bey who had died young in 1861 without ruling when Habib was only three years old, and his mother was a Circassian odalisque named Fatma. His uncle Muhammad III as-Sadiq took charge of his education and married him to the niece of his Grand Vizier Mustapha Ben Ismaïl, his favourite courtier and mainstay of authority in the Regency of Tunis. Made Bey al-Mahalla (Heir Apparent) on 12 May 1906, he succeeded his cousin Muhammad V an-Nasir on 8 July 1922. He was made a Divisional General in the beylical army on the same day he became Bey al Mahalla and was promoted to Marshal when he succeeded to the throne.

Throughout his reign he did not seek to hinder the authorities of the French protectorate, in contrast to the approach of his predecessor. He came to the throne deeply in debt and without any support owing to his coming from a branch of the family that was not close to power. He therefore remained reliant on the good graces of the French Resident General, Lucien Saint.

Nevertheless, the aftermath of the First World War saw a change in relations between France and its colonies. About 80,000 Tunisians, mostly conscripted, had served in the French army, and about 20,000 had been killed or wounded. The Ottoman Empire, which until its dissolution had been the nominal suzerain of the Beys of Tunis, no longer existed. Ideas of self-determination were growing, and the Tunisian national movement regrouped in 1922 with the foundation of the Destour party. The French authorities took a number of political initiatives, establishing consultative councils including the Grand Council and regional (caïdat) councils and introducing new laws allowing some Tunisians to acquire French nationality. These initiatives galvanised the Destourians, prompting Habib Bey to advise Abdelaziz Thâalbi to leave the country if he continued to oppose them.

Muhammad VI al-Habib
- Royal Family of Tunisia

Habib Bey took part in the inauguration of the Grand Mosque of Paris in July 1926 along with Mouley Youssef of Morocco. He was also the first Tunisian ruler to have his name included in Friday prayers, replacing the Ottoman caliph.

Lucien Saint invited him and his sons Azzedine Bey and Lamine Bey to make a private visit to Marignac in July 1923 and again the following year.

He bought the Zarrouk palace in Carthage where he lived, by the sea, until his death. He was buried in the Tourbet el Bey in the medina of Tunis. He was succeeded by Ahmed Bey.

Preceded by Muhammad V an-Nasir	Bey of Tunis; 1922–1929	Succeeded by Ahmad II ibn Ali
