= Tunisian nationalism =

Political ideology

Flag of Tunisia

Tunisian nationalism refers to the nationalism of Tunisians and Tunisian culture. Tunisian nationalism's origins stretch back to the 19th century; however, Tunisian nationalism became a significant political force after 1908 with the founding of the Young Tunisians movement, and the more significant Destour (Arabic for "Constitution") Party established after World War I. The Destour Party called for Tunisian autonomy within the French Empire and that France should not dominate Tunisia's politics and society. France responded by banning the Destour Party in 1933, resulting in the rise of a more radical nationalist party, the Neo-Destour Party being formed in 1934 led by Habib Bourguiba. The Neo-Destour Party demanded independence of Tunisia from France, though it respected French and Western culture and sought to maintain close links with France after independence was achieved.

== See also ==
- African nationalism
- Algerian nationalism
- Arab nationalism
- Egyptian nationalism
- Libyan nationalism
- Moroccan nationalism

== Bibliography ==
- Motyl, Alexander J. (2001). Encyclopedia of Nationalism, Volume II. Academic Press. ISBN 0-12-227230-7.
