= Neo Destour =

1934–1964 political party in Tunisia

New Constitutional Liberal Party حزب الحر الدستوري الجديد
- French name: Nouveau Parti libéral constitutionnel
- Former presidents: Mahmoud El Materi (1934–1938); Habib Bourguiba (1938–1964)
- Founded: 2 March 1934; Ksar Hellal Congress
- Dissolved: 22 October 1964
- Split from: Destour
- Succeeded by: Socialist Destourian Party
- Newspaper: L'Action Tunisienne
- Ideology: Tunisian nationalism Bourguibism; Secularism; Arab nationalism Pan-Arabism

The New Constitutional Liberal Party (Arabic: الحزب الحر الدستوري الجديد, el-Ḥizb el-Ḥurr ed-Dustūrī el-Jadīd; French: Nouveau Parti libéral constitutionnel), most commonly known as Neo Destour, was a Tunisian political party founded in 1934 in Dar Ayed, the house of independence activist Ahmed Ayed, by a group of Tunisian nationalist politicians during the French protectorate. It originated from a split with the Destour party.

Led by Habib Bourguiba, Neo Destour became the ruling party upon Tunisian independence in 1956. In 1964, it was renamed the Socialist Destourian Party.

== History ==
The party was formed as a result of a split from the pre-existing Destour party in 1934, during the Ksar Hellal Congress of March 2. Several leaders were particularly prominent during the party's early years before World War II: Habib Bourguiba, Mahmoud El Materi, Tahar Sfar, Bahri Guiga, and Salah ben Youssef.

Prior to the split, a younger group of Destour members had alarmed the party elders by appealing directly to the populace through their more radical newspaper L'Action Tunisienne. The younger group, many from the provinces, seemed more in tune with a wider spectrum of the country-wide Tunisian people, while the party elders represented a more established constituency in the capital city of Tunis; yet both groups were proponents of change, either autonomy or independence. The rupture came at the Destour party congress of 1934.

=== World War II ===
At the outbreak of war in 1939, Neo-Destour leaders, though still untried, were deported to France. However, they were released by the Nazis in 1942 following the German occupation of Vichy France. Hitler then handed them over to the Mussolini's fascist government in Rome. There the leaders were treated with deference, the fascists hoping to gain support for the Axis. Bourguiba steadily refused to cooperate. But Hussein Triki worked with the Nazis under Neo-Destour. After allies' advance, victory in El Alamein, he escaped to Europe, there he worked for The Mahgreb, a North African Arabic organization working for the Nazis' war machine against the allies and has collaborated with Hitler's ally Mufti of Palestine.

The Neo-Destour Party was one of the Arab factions that the Nazi Germans hoped to win over to the Axis side . As majority of its leaders imprisoned by the French, Eitel Friedrich Moellhausen, Rahn's deputy, argued that the Arabs could be incited to action “against Jews and Anglo-Saxons” through the release of the prisoners in Marseille, without the Germans having to provide specific assurances concerning independence.

=== Post WWII ===
Eventually the Neo Destour led the Tunisian independence movement after the tumultuous period during World War II. Then Bourguiba was imprisoned and after the war in Egypt, while Ben Salih was the local, hands-on party leader. A significant break within the party ranks occurred in the final year of the independence struggle. In April, 1955, Salah ben Yusuf openly challenged Habib Bourguiba over his gradualist tactics during his autonomy negotiations with the French. Also Ben Yusuf, who cultivated support at al-Zaytuna Mosque and took a pan-Arab political line, disputed Bourguiba's more liberal, secular, pro-Western approach. The party's labor leader Ahmad Ben Salah kept the Tunisian General Labor Union in Bourguiba's camp. The Neo Destour party expelled Ben Yusuf that October; in November 1955 he mounted a large street demonstration but to no avail. Ben Yusuf then left for Nasser's Egypt where he was welcomed.

Independence of Tunisia from France was negotiated largely by the Neo Destour's Bourguiba. The effective date was March 20, 1956. The next year the Republic of Tunisia was constituted, which replaced the Beylical form of government. The Neo Destour became the ruling party under Prime Minister and later President Habib Bourguiba. In 1963, the Neo Destour was proclaimed the only legally permitted party in Tunisia, though for all intents and purposes the country had been a one-party state since independence.

Later, the Neo Destour party was renamed the Socialist Destourian Party (PSD in its French acronym) in 1964, to signal the government's commitment to a socialist phase of political-economic development. This phase failed to fulfill expectations, however, and was discontinued in 1969 with the dismissal of Ahmad ben Salah as economics minister by President Bourguiba.

In 1988, under President Ben Ali, the party was again renamed, to become the Rassemblement Constitutionel Démocratique (RCD). The RCD continued as the Tunisian ruling party under President Ben Ali, who became increasingly corrupt and dictatorial. Early in 2011, he was forced out of office and his regime and the ruling party abolished, as a result of the liberal Tunisian Revolution. Similar subsequent events of popular regime change, which had spread to other Arab countries, became known as the Arab Spring.

== Leaders ==
- Mahmoud El Materi (1934-1938)
- Habib Bourguiba (1938-1964)

== Electoral history ==
=== Presidential elections ===
Election	Party candidate	Votes	%	Result
1959	Habib Bourguiba	1,005,769	100%	Elected ✓

=== Chamber of Deputies elections ===
Election	Party leader	Votes	%	Seats	+/–	Position	Result
1956	Habib Bourguiba	597,763	98.7%	98 / 98	▲98	▲1st	Supermajority government
1959	Habib Bourguiba	1,002,298	99.7%	90 / 90	▼8	1st	Supermajority government

== Notable people ==
- Hédi Saidi

== See also ==
- Destour
- Socialist Destourian Party (PSD)
- Democratic Constitutional Rally (RCD)
