= L'Action Tunisienne =

Former Tunisian Francophone newspaper

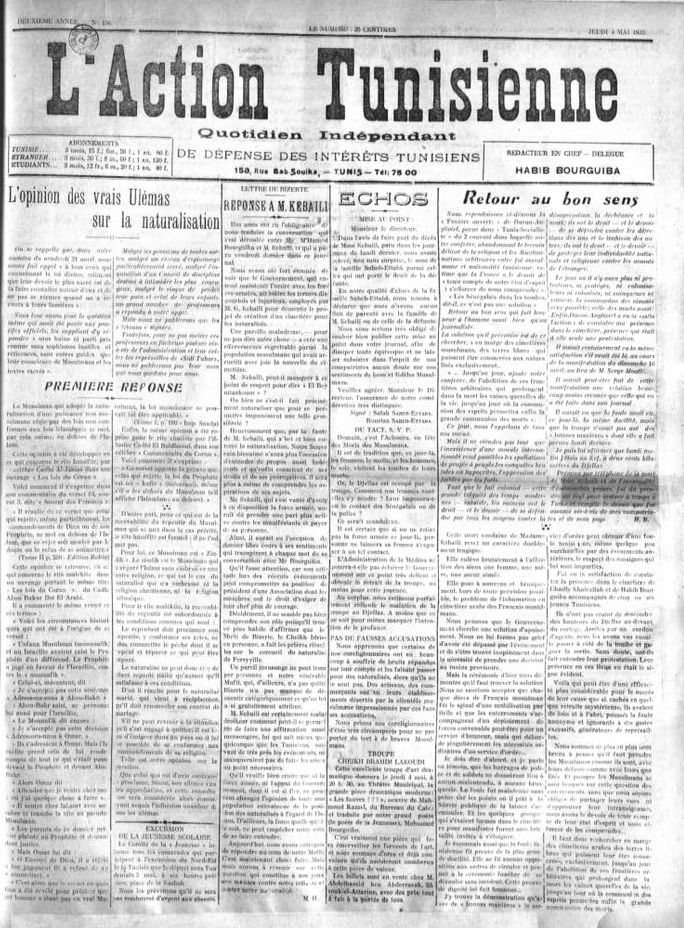
- Cover of L'Action Tunisienne (May 4, 1933), with the headline story reporting on the Naturalized Tunisian issue.
- Type: Daily newspaper
- Format: Broadsheet
- Founders: Habib Bourguiba; Mahmoud El Materi
- Founded: 1 November 1932
- Ceased publication: 19 March 1988; 38 years ago
- Country: Tunisia

L'Action Tunisienne (sometimes abbreviated to L'Action) is a former Tunisian Francophone newspaper founded by Habib Bourguiba and published from November 1, 1932, to March 19, 1988. Working for the Destour party, at first, it later became part of the Neo-Destour then the Socialist Destourian Party, since its foundation on March 2, 1934, in Ksar Hellal.

It gathered nationalist activist like Béchir M'hedhbi, co-founder of the journal and its first editor in chief, Mahmoud El Materi, Bahri Guiga, M'hamed Bourguiba, Ali Bouhajeb and Tahar Sfar.

Becoming a daily newspaper, it pursued its publishing after Tunisia's independence in 1956. Its last edition was published on March 19, 1988. It was replaced the following morning by Le Renouveau newspaper.

== History ==
=== Origins and foundation ===
In the early 1930s, Habib and M'hamed Bourguiba, El Materi, Guiga and Sfar, started writing articles in La Voix du Tunisien, a newspaper owned by Chedly Khairallah, a member of the Destour. Soon, they stood out from their elders of the party thanks to their originality and the way they express the problems and issues related to the Tunisian people. Their new reasoning charmed public opinion as they were in favor of the inviolability of national identity and political sovereignty of the Tunisian people. Furthermore, they advocated for a gradual emancipation of the country while supporting a nationalism that fought against a regime and not against a civilization.

They quickly attracted the interest of public opinion but also French preponderants, large landowners and businessmen, who had a great influence on the colonial administration. Thus, they obtained from the French Residence firm measures to end the freedom of expression of the five journalists: On May 12, 1931, many nationalist newspapers were censored, including La Voix du Tunisien while the Bourguibas, Guiga, Salah Farhat and El Materi were prosecuted. Nevertheless, they obtained from their friends in Paris, Marius Moutet and Gaston Bergery, the postponing of their hearings to June 9, 1931. Awaiting trial, the journalists expressed their dissatisfaction in a protest campaign.

However, thanks to popular pressure the day of trial, the hearings were adjourned once again. That did not please, resident-general, François Manceron, who succeeded in starting an argument between the journalists and Khairallah, over the management of the newspaper, which ended up with their resignation from the journal.

Despite that, the group stood in touch and gathered sometimes in Café de la Kasbah or Baghdad restaurant to discuss politics and national news. They were often in the company of French or Tunisian socialists, among whom, the pharmacist, Ali Bouhajeb. Once, while having a talk, they decided to create their own newspaper. A drafting committee was, therefore, created among whom, Habib and M'hamed Bourguiba, Bahri Guiga, Tahar Sfar, Mahmoud El Materi and Ali Bouhajeb, who was also the manager of the publishing company. Béchir Mhedhbi, a senior year high school student, joined the team to be the copyeditor. As for the headquarters, they were settled in the back room of the Bouhageb pharmacy

It was in a context of Great Depression, when the lower classes suffered hard conditions, that L'Action Tunisienne published it first edition on November 1, 1932.

=== Raising popularity ===
==== Defending lower classes ====
Disappointed by the elders' resigned moderation, the young nationalists raged and defended lower classes. Bouhajeb devoted a whole section to this cause: La Voix du guenillard while the other committee members wrote, in turn, in their editorial. Supplied in information by documents provided by administration officials, they soon acquired a large audience. For example, Bourguiba advocated for lower classes rights. He demonstrated the mechanism of colonial exploitation, ascending from effects to causes, while addressing the social phenomena, calling on the workers and students to organize in order to defend themselves against exploitation.

==== Naturalized Tunisian issue ====
L'Action Tunisienne organized a campaign to protest against the Naturalized Tunisian issue. The campaign was a total success raising the journalists from Destour activist to members of the executive committee of the party.

=== Later activism to independence ===
L'Action was a platform for nationalists who expressed their dissatisfaction with the protectorate. Among its famous journalists were Bourguiba, Hédi Nouira and many others.

=== Post-independence ===
After obtaining independence on March 20, 1956, L'Action Tunisienne maintained its activism as the Neo Destour newspaper then the Socialist Destourian Party one until it was replaced with Le Renouveau.
