= Mahmoud El Materi =

Tunisian politician

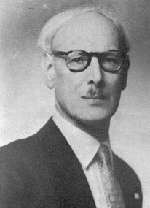
- Born: Mahmoud El Materi; December 1897; Tunis, Tunisia
- Died: December 13, 1972 (aged 74–75)
- Occupations: Physician, politician

Mahmoud El Materi (December 1897 – December 13, 1972) was a Tunisian physician and politician. He was the first president and one of the founders of the Neo Destour.

== Biography ==
=== Early life ===
In his private journals, Mahmoud El Materi mentions that he does not know his exact date of birth. In fact, as his mother died during childbirth, he was entrusted to Baya Ben Jaafar, a close relative of the family, to raise him. Later, his aunt Fatouma and his older brother Ali took on the task, and raised him. He was born towards the end of December 1897.

According to the historian Mounir Charfi, he was born on December 5, 1897.

Coming from a Tunisian family with Greek and Turkish roots, Mahmoud El Materi was the child of Khadija Ferah and of Mokthar El Materi, chaouachi and imam at the El Ksar Mosque (hanefite), who died months after the birth of his son. His grandfather Ahmed was a hanafite teacher at Al-Zaytuna University.

=== Education ===
Like most of the children by that time, he started attending regularly kuttab at the age of six. Two years later, he enrolled in the Franco-Arab school where he obtained his primary school certificate and his patent of Arabic. After that, he continued his tuition at Sadiki College, where he met for the first time the few years younger Habib Bourguiba, and graduated in 1916. On July 12, 1919, he got his baccalaureate with honors.

Afterwards, he went to both the Faculty of Science and the School of Medicine in Dijon. With no scholarship or family support, he had to look for a second job as a high school's supervisor and then of a business school.

After obtaining a degree in science, he enrolled in the fourth year of medicine in Paris where he obtained his doctorate in medicine with honors on July 6, 1926, after presenting his thesis about the fetus suffering during labor. By that, he is the third Tunisian Muslim doctor to be a graduate of the Faculty of Medicine of Paris in the University of Paris and the eleventh doctor trained in a European faculty.

He came back to Tunisia to settle at the age of 28, in the beginning of November 1926.

=== Mahmoud El Materi the doctor ===
Initially, Materi didn't succeed in getting a hospital internship because the protectorate authorities doubted his feelings regarding the French presence. The reason behind this was Mahmoud's previous participation in nationalist gatherings with his older brothers, Ali and Hafiz, followers of Young Tunisians and former employees at Sadiki Hospital. Yet, he applied and was accepted as a volunteer assistant in the department of Dr. René Broc at the Sadiki Hospital. During this fellowship, he strengthened his connections with other important doctors and researchers like Charles Nicolle, Ernest Conseil and Gabriel Brun. At the same time, he became a regular contributor in several nationalist journals.

In March 1927, El Materi opened his own office in Bab Menara quarter, while continuing to work as a volunteering assistant at Sadiki Hospital.

In the 1930s, he joined Dr. Conseil's team in their work to fight pneumonic plague that raged then in Tunisia. As part of the process, patients were isolated in quarantine in the civil prison, and the medical team joined them in order to treat them.

In order to ensure stronger assistance to the victims of the second world war, and with the defection of the Red Cross, Mahmoud El Materi founded the Tunisian Red Crescent on April 22, 1943. After becoming minister of health, he had it recognized by the International Committee of the Red Cross on September 30, 1957.

== Political life ==
During his stay in Dijon, Mahmoud El Materi wrote political articles in several newspapers including Le Populaire. Later in Paris, he became member of the French Communist Party that he left quickly for the French Socialist Party. He got engaged as well in the Human Rights League and with some friends, founded Étoile Nord-Africaine. As a result of that, he became a regular contributor in several newspapers such as Le Progrès de la Côte-d'Or, Le Rappel socialiste and Le Populaire de Paris.

In 1924, he reunited with Habib Bourguiba, and together they started a militant career in Tunisian student associations in Paris.

With Habib Bourguiba, El Materi belonged to the core of the founders of the Neo Destour (Ksar Hellal Congress of March 2, 1934), the ancestor of the Constitutional Democratic Rally, and he was chosen by his peers to become the first president of the party, a position he held for four years, until his resignation in 1938 following his organized strike in November the previous year.

== Personal life ==
Mahmoud El Materi got married in 1931 to Kmar Ben Sheikh Ahmed. She gave birth to seven children: Cherif, Leila, Faika, Amel, Aziz, Anissa and Samira.

With his engagement in economic and political pursuits, El Materi enabled the upward movement of his family; his nephew, Moncef El Materi (father of Sakher El Materi), shifted from a military career to a business one. With another brother, Tahar El Materi, Moncef established in the early 1970s a pharmaceutical firm called Al Adwya, one of Tunisia's biggest private drugs companies today.
