= Tunisian national movement =

20th-century independence movement

The Tunisian national movement was a sociopolitical movement, born at the beginning of the 20th century, which led to the fight against the French protectorate of Tunisia and gained Tunisian independence in 1956. Inspired by the ideology of the Young Turks and Tunisian political reforms in the latter half of the 19th century, the group of traditionalists—lawyers, doctors and journalists—gradually gave way to a well-structured political organisation of the new French-educated elite. The organisation could mobilise supporters to confront the authorities of the protectorate in order to advance the demands that it made of the French government. The movement's strategy alternated between negotiations and armed confrontations over the years. Support from the powerful trade unions and the feminist movement, along with an intellectual and musical cultural revival, contributed to a strong assertion of national identity which was reinforced by the educational and political systems after independence.

The movement was composed of many diverse groups, but from the 1930s was united by mounting social forces: a lower-middle class engaged in the capitalist economy, new Westernised elites, and an organised working class sensitive to social demands.

== Key actors of the movement ==
Different actors organised the nationalist movement. However, it was the intellectual circles that gave the first impulse to it. They were consisted of the intellectuals Mohammed el Snoussi, and Makki Ibn Azouz, leading a movement of "progressive ulama, opposed to both foreign domination and religious decadence". Their ideas were influenced by "pan-islamism, nationalism and constitutionalism".

Second, a group named the Young Tunisians had a considerable influence on the movement; yet it was limited to a certain strata of the society that is the "educated upper, often clerical classes". This group was formed in 1907, under the initiative of the Bash Hamba brothers, and Abdelaziz Thâalbi. The latter then edited the group's journal, Le Tunisien, that aimed at defending the rights of the indigenous people of Tunisia, published both in French and in Arabic. The Young Tunisians were opposed to the French authority, and to the "Old Turbans", the defenders of religious traditionalism, present in the intellectual circles. They fought for the "restoration of beylical authority", supported by the establishment of a democratic society.

Another actor that became increasingly important over time was the Destour Party, that was the legacy of the Young Tunisians with considerable reforms. The Destour party collected ideas of "muslim reformism, with an important middle class national consciousness". They incarnated the compromise between the Young Tunisians, too centred over a small portion of a population, and the religious intellectual circles such as the Old Turbans. They displayed an eclectic dualism by mixing Western modernism and traditional Islam in their ideas. The Destour group was led by Abdelaziz Thâalbi, that pleaded for a constitutional regime guaranteeing liberal freedoms, through a legislative assembly, equality before the law, and compulsory education. Later on, the Destour party faced some internal disagreements on the process of independence, and the political strategies that should be used, which led to the creation of the Neo Destour in 1933.

The Neo Destour was "under the leadership of Habib Bourguiba and Taher Sfar", and was less willing to compromise than the Destour. The party was more dynamic, and enacted a list of "eight immediate demands" and "called a successful general strike" (ibid), provoking in this regard strong countermeasures provoking the anger of the French authorities, and "culminating in the exile of Bourguiba". During the Second World War, they successfully continued their operations underground. The 8 point program enacted by the Destour party comprised different elements. It preconized the need to separate "the legislative, judicial and executive powers", equal pay for Tunisian and French officials that followed the same tasks, "freedom of press and assembly". Contrarily to the Old Destour, that was highly panarabic, and focused on the elite and privileged class, the Neo Destour was more inclusive. The recruitment of members was made through small bureaucrats, and public servants. It was focused on national sovereignty, religious neutrality, and the separation of powers.

== The beginnings of the political movement ==
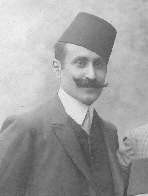
Ali Bach Hamba of the Young Tunisians

In 1881 a French protectorate was established in Tunisia. Over the following decades, a number of factors led to the beginnings of a national Tunisian movement. The economic development of the French protectorate required the formation of a Tunisian middle class; this group felt divorced from political and public life in the country. Some of the Tunisian elite, now with greater contact with Europe, began trying to reconcile Islam with modern European ideas. The protectorate began to disrupt sectors of the old society of Tunisia, and as a result new classes formed. Dually alienated by the establishment of a new order and their unassimilated existence alongside such an order, new classes of the educated counter-elite, students, industrial proletariat, clerical class and a rural proletariat manifested. From Istanbul, Tunisian exiles including Ismaïl Sfayhi and Salah Chérif led a program of anti-colonialist propaganda. Tunisia was the first state in the Arab world influenced by modern nationalism: the movement against the French occupation started from the beginning of the 20th century.

In 1907 the Young Tunisians party was formed by Béchir Sfar, Abdeljelil Zaouche and the lawyer Ali Bach Hamba. These intellectuals, mostly of Turco-Tunisians origin, who had been to Sadiki College and in some cases had received a higher education in France, were inspired by the Young Turks of the same period. They also based their principles on those of earlier reformers such as Hayreddin Pasha. The party, which consisted mainly of middle-class French-educated Tunisians, campaigned to safeguard Tunisia's Arab-Muslim heritage, preserve the character of the Tunisian state and restore the Tunisian identity.

The modernist tendencies of the Young Tunisians faced disdain from a traditionalist Muslim group called the Old Turbans, who did not find cause to object to French rule as they believed the existing Protectorate preserved the Islamist institutions and traditions of the country. However, following a proposal of the French to open religiously controlled bodies of land known as the habous, the Old Turbans support for French rule waned, resulting in collaboration with the Young Tunisians to present a solid Tunisian front against the French. This collaboration culminated in a delegation being sent to Paris to plead for the Tunisian cause, however failing in their initial efforts. The alliance of the Young Tunisians and the Old Turbans precipitated the eclectic dualism that Tunisian Nationalism is still influenced by today. The Young Tunisian movement was pivotal in embedding modern liberal thought into the Tunisian nationalist tradition.

Also in 1907, Zaouche and Bach Hamba founded the weekly paper Le Tunisien, initially in French followed by an Arabic version two years later. The paper called for equality of education, salaries and access to higher education, as well as measures to protect fellahs and artisans. At the same time, Zaouche established a program for the vital sectors of education, justice and taxation, and championed it at the Tunisian Consultative Conference from February 1907.

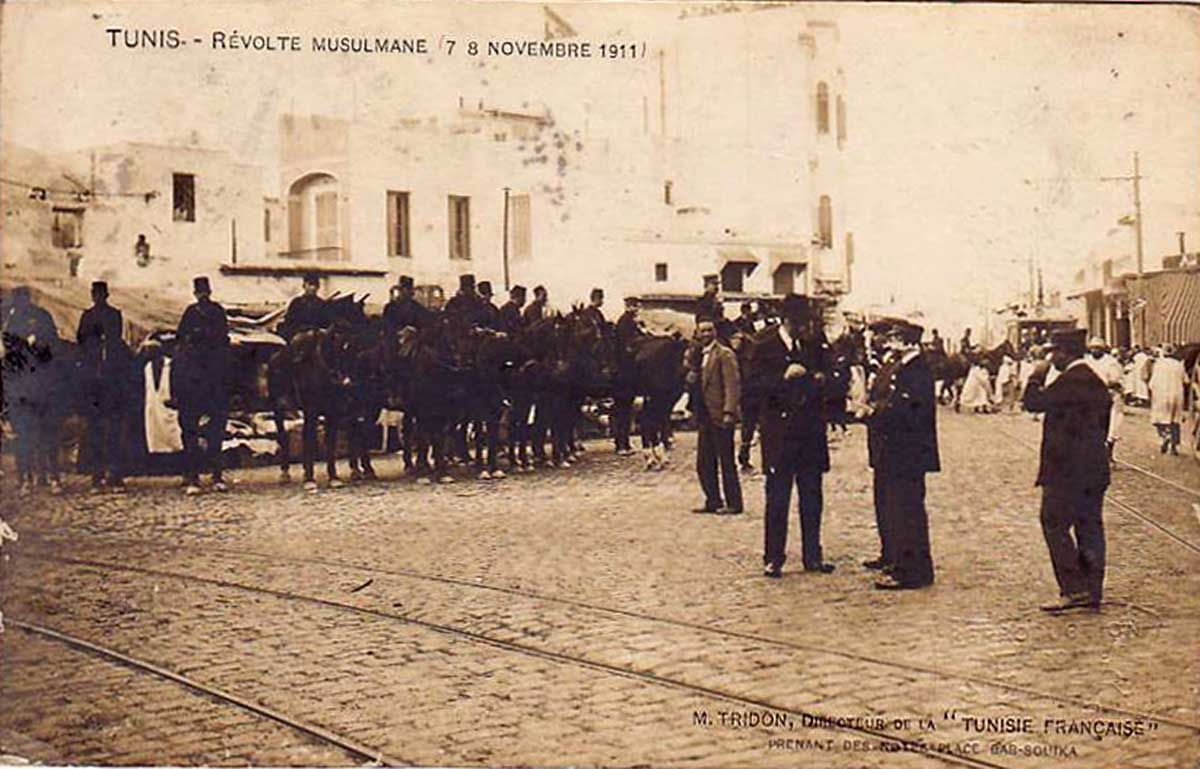
Troops during the November 1911 riots

Relations between the Tunisian nationalists and the powerful Resident-General deteriorated rapidly. From 1908 Le Tunisian was banned. In spite of the censorship, public opinion remained sympathetic to the Muslim cause, thanks to the private madrasas (schools) developed by Abdelaziz Thâalbi. Moreover, the capture of Tripolitania and Cyrenaica by Italy in the Turco-Italian war stirred up unrest. 1911 saw the first confrontation with the authorities of the protectorate: in September the municipality of Tunis tried to register the Jellaz cemetery, provoking hostility from the locals who saw this as a violation of their rights and an insult to their religion. Tensions grew, and on November 7, when security forces prevented Tunisians from entering the cemetery, a riot broke out. During the two days that followed, 11 people including 7 policemen were killed, and many people were injured in the Italian neighbourhood of the city. 71 rioters were charged, and in June 1912 thirty-five were sentenced and seven received the death penalty.

The accidental death of an eight-year-old Tunisian child on February 9, 1912, killed by a tram from the French-run Tunisian tram company driven by an Italian driver, became a focal point for anger about discrimination by the tram company. Tunisians responded with the Tunis Tram Boycott. (At this point Italians were the largest foreign community in Tunisia, with nearly 150 000 people, compared to a French population of just 40 000). They demanded damages, the dismissal of Italian drivers and the hiring of Tunisian ones, and an end to discrimination.

The nationalist movement had begun to fall off by the middle of the 1920s, stymied by weakened leadership and French repression. However, nationalist resurgence began to appear in the early 1930s, characterised by a growing identification with the mass population and their religious reservations about French policy. The French policy of naturalisation (1923) caused unrest among the Muslim populations as it was considered an act that was inconsistent with the true tenants of Islam. As a result, religious leaders and nationalist leaders began to group together to create anti-French demonstrations and violence. This affair highlighted to the Tunisians their distinctness from the French, particularly underscoring religious as a 'unifying bond of the Tunisian people'.

A series of strong French measures exiled various nationalist figures and leaders from the 1930s, however these measures were relaxed by 1936 and the exiled leaders were allowed to return, as well as freedom of press and the participation of Tunisian's in the administration of public affairs. Yet following the fall of Premier Leon Blum, reform projects were scrapped in both Tunisia and Algeria, resulting in the Tunisian nationalists revoking their policy of collaboration with the French. This led to repression by the French, imprisoning nationalist leaders and dissolving the Old-Destour and Neo-Destour parties. Following World War II, nationalist expectations were heightened. The Neo-Destour party continued to work in and outside of Tunisia to garner support for self-determination. In 1950, Habib Bourgiba outlined a 7-point program that sought to afford greater responsibility to Tunisian officials while decreasing the authority of the French residency. According to different sources, the Tunisian decolonization only resulted in peaceful negotiations, without armed conflict.

== Unfolding of the events ==
The independence came rather incrementally, through small steps. In 1947, 100,000 Tunisian workers went to the streets and 3000-4000 went on strike in Sfax demanding improved working conditions from the French. In September 1949, after he was exiled, Bourguiba was allowed to come back to Tunisia. A few months later, he put into place a programme in seven points, confirming that a cooperation between the French authorities and the Tunisians was necessary. The Neo Destour followed this plan of negotiation, and in 1950, a Tunisian government was formed with Mohammed Chenik, and Salah Ben Youssef, to negotiate the successive attempts and stepts of independence. In January 1952, the new French resident Jean de Hautecloque cancelled the Neo Destour congress, and arrested 150 members of the party, Bourguiba included. As a response, the UGTT declares a general strike, therefore putting pressure on the French authorities and riots broke out.

As a result, in May 1952, Tunisian ministries were expanded, and the new French resident Voizard decides to relax the regime and laws upon the Tunisians, and liberate some political prisoners. Two years later, Pierre Mendès France became the president of the Conseil in France, and approved in July the government of internal autonomy in Tunisia, however Tunisia was still partially under the legal status of protectorate. At this time, Pierre Mendès France demanded the constitution of a ministry to discuss the modalities of the autonomy. This protocole sparked anger both from the pro-French protectorate community in Tunis, but also from the general secretary of the Neo Destour, Salah Ben Youssef. Ben Youssef saw these incremental changes as too minor, and stated they were a slur against the Arabism cause, and integral independence, not only in Tunisia but in the whole Maghreb. This created a split between the Old Destour, and the Neo Destour, and Salah Ben Youssef was excluded from the Neo Destour party because he disagreed on the processes of independence. In 1956, negotiations were brought up again with the new French government, and a treat was proposed. On the 20th of March 1956, the treaty of May 1881 stipulating that Tunisia was under French category was deemed obsolete, and Tunisia was recognised as fully independent. In July 1957, Bourguiba proclaimed the end of the monarchy, and the establishment of the Republic of Tunisia.

== Aftermath of the independence ==
Post independence in Tunisia, it was extremely difficult to readjust the economic life of the country, since it was tied up with that of France for many decades.

A constitution was drafted, and elected by universal male suffrage. The official religion of the state was decided to be Islam, and the official language was Tunisian Arabic and French. All sorts of freedoms were guaranteed such as individual freedom, freedom of belief, and freedom of free speech, which appear to be at odds with future dictatorial regimes in Tunisia. The authority was concentrated in the hands of one party, namely the Neo- Destour, which was initially a national liberation movement. Policy-wise, the party was based on Bourguiba’s ideals, who was also "president of the council". Many fields other than the political one were emphasised : state secretaries for information, youth, and sport "denoted the great importance which the government and the prime minister give to these matters". Moreover, the Tunisian authorities regained total control and "complete responsibility" on internal security, and a "small national army" was formed. The reforms taken by the new regime had more modernist tendencies, by the supervision of the religious foundations by the civil administration. Polygamy was abolished as well, putting an emphasis on women's right through the publication of the code of Personal Status, and by also allowing them to vote in the municipal elections of the year following the independence. One year after the independence, the most salient issue remaining was the Algerian war, as a threat to "a reconciliation of French and Tunisian interests".
