= Abdeljelil Zaouche =

Tunisian politician (1873–1947)

- عبد الجليل الزّاوش
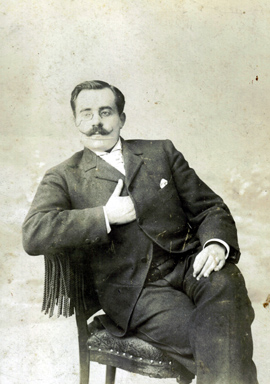
- Born: 15 December 1873; La Marsa, Beylik of Tunis
- Died: 3 January 1947 (aged 73); Tunis, French protectorate of Tunisia
- Occupation: Politician

Abdeljelil Zaouche (Arabic: عبد الجليل الزّاوش; 15 December 1873 – 3 January 1947) was a Tunisian politician, reformer, and campaigner in the Tunisian independence movement.

== Youth ==
Zaouche was born into a wealthy bourgeois family which had arrived in Tunis from Andalucia via Algeria in the eighteenth century. His father, Tahar, and his uncle, Hassan, occupied high-ranking positions under Ali Bey. They were, respectively, General of the royal guard and Brigadier-General in charge of tax-raising. He was born in his family's mansion in La Marsa to an Italian mother.

His secondary education was at the Collège Saint-Charles in Tunis and then the lycée Louis-le-Grand in Paris where he took his baccalauréat. In 1894, he matriculated at the law faculty in Paris while also studying at the Institut des sciences politiques and the Collège de France. Strongly influenced by Jean Jaurès, he was also a pupil of Émile Durkheim, Émile Boutroux, Henri Poincaré, Antoine Aulard and Ernest Lavisse. He graduated in law and returned to Tunis in 1900, where he involved himself in public affairs.

In 1901, together with the Ramella brothers, he founded a flour mill, and in 1903, he hosted a visit by Muhammad Abduh. In 1903, he set up the first scientific press in the Arab world, Al Matbâa Al Ilmiya.

== Economic reform and political campaigns ==
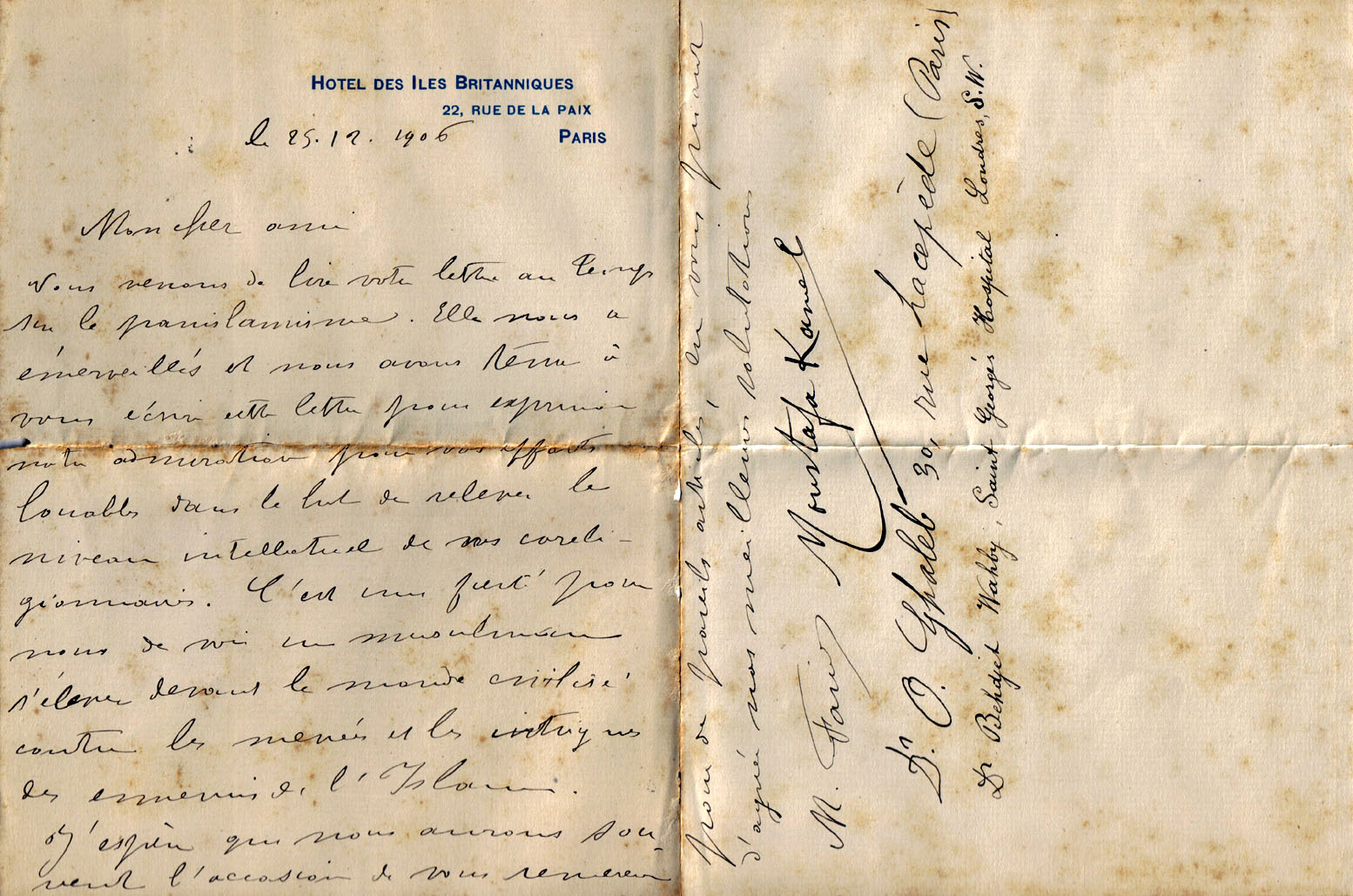
Letter from Mustafa Kamil Pasha to Zaouche (1906)

Zaouche was noted for the emphasis he placed on economic issues – agriculture, manufactures and trade. He devoted much of his work to advancing professional qualifications, management standards, creativity and competitiveness. In 1908, Zaouche took part in the first mixed session of the Tunisian Consultative Conference and chose to be a rapporteur and member of the Finance Commission of the Tunisian section of this body.

From its first session, Zaouche demanded the suppression of the mejba (poll tax), which accounted for a sixth of the government's income and was used to pay a number of officials. including caïds, khalifas and cheikhs. Tunisia's declining agriculture made the mejba ever more unbearable to the people, and had triggered a number of uprisings, including the major Mejba Revolt of 1864–65. His proposals for replacement sources of public income included reductions in taxes on labour and increases in taxes on (colonial) capital as well as on mining and extractive industries. These proposals were vigorously opposed by the French colonials who dominated the Conference.

In 1910, a loan was proposed to fund the extension of the railway network, which was to be repaid by additional taxes on the Tunisian population. Zaouche used this as an opportunity to renew his attacks on French capital, arguing that the infrastructure paid for by ordinary Tunisians would bring them little benefit. If a loan was to be taken out, he argued, part of it should directly benefit Tunisians by being invested in schools and basic training.

Zaouche also served as a member of the Higher Government Council (Conseil Supérieur du Gouvernement) (1911–1912) as well as on various bodies such as the Commission for the Revival of Indigenous Arts, and the Mixed (i.e. Franco-Tunisian) Commission for the Collège Sadiki. At the same time, Zaouche spoke out about issues in public administration and argued for republican principles. He sought to preserve the integrity and distinctiveness of Tunisian institutions by emphasising the importance of appointing individuals of competence, probity and independence. He was a co-founder of the Collège Sadiki alumni association and of the Cercle tunisien (an intellectual club interested in current affairs which sought to articulate the defence of Tunisian interests), and President of the Khaldounia.

He was also a shareholder and board member of a number of newspapers, including La Dépêche tunisienne, Le Progrès, La Poste tunisienne, L'Autonome and, in Paris, of Le Temps. Zaouche also edited a number of articles for the socialist daily Le Libéral. He was one of the founders of the nationalist Young Tunisian movement, and had links with the Young Turks, with reforming Egyptian nationalists such as Muhammad Abduh and Mustafa Kamil Pasha, as well as with supporters of panarabism like Pierre Loti and Charles Géniaux. For the five years that Le Tunisien was published, he campaigned alongside Ali Bach Hamba — whose first cousin Chérifa he married — and other Young Tunisians, producing a steady stream of articles highly critical of the French Protectorate of Tunisia.

== Educational reform ==
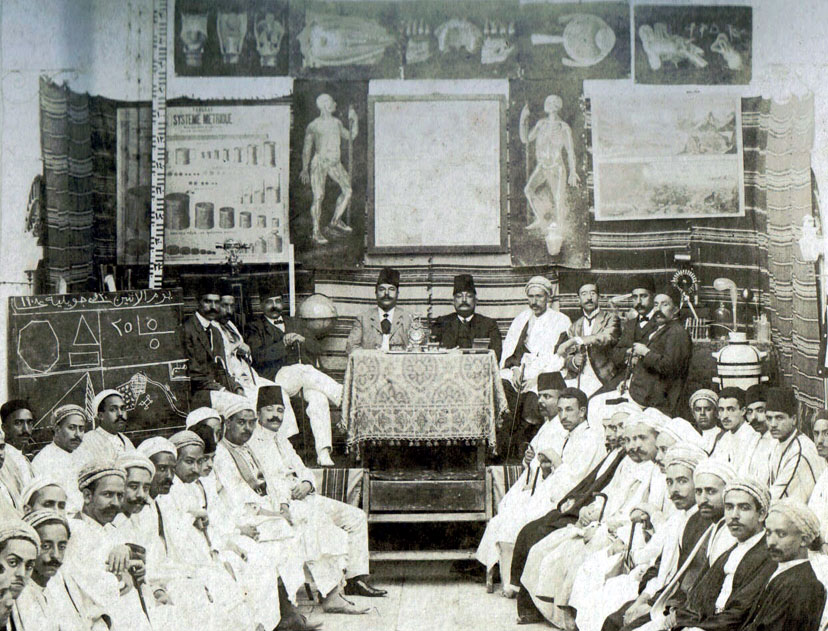
Béchir Sfar, Zaouche et Mohamed Lasram at the Khaldounia (1908)

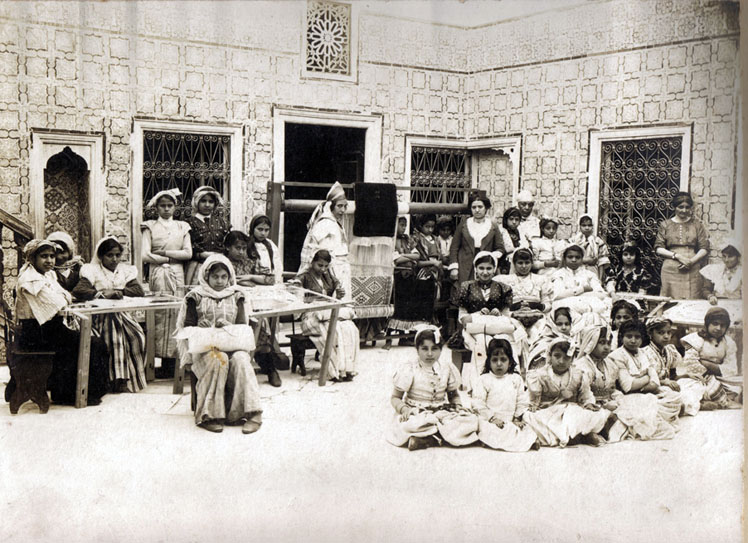
School for Tunisian girls in 1914

For Abdeljelil Zaouche, education was the key to reviving economic growth and social stability. It was the only means of ensuring that positions in the civil service would be opened to Tunisians (from which they were excluded at the time) and a necessary prelude to building a competent and independent judiciary. Zaouche summarised his position by citing Danton: "After bread, education is the first need of the people." Tunisians, he argued, needed a basic education in the Arabic language, "to preserve his place in his own country." He also advocated reformed kouttab schools and mixed Franco-Arab institutions. He also argued for access for Tunisians to modern education institutions both in Tunisia and in France. He published a number of brochures, including "Native Education" (L'enseignement des indigènes) (1900) and "The Franco-Arab School" in which he argued for education for both sexes and all classes. The education of women was a theme to which he frequently returned in his speaking and writing, and which was also taken up by other Young Tunisian spokesmen such as Sadok Zmerli and Khairallah Ben Mustapha.

He was a member of the Commission on the Modernisation of Teaching at the University of Ez-Zitouna after the student strike of 1910, as well as on the mixed (Franco-Tunisian) Commission for the Reform of Sadiki College. He denounced the discrimination faced by Tunisian students who wished to study at the Lycée Carnot de Tunis, which was the only institution giving access to modern university studies.

== Reform of agriculture and manufacture ==
After the destruction of the First World War and the fall in French agricultural production, the French colonists stepped up the expropriation of land in Tunisia, soon controlling 4m hectares or 20% of the cultivable land. Zaouche, a member of the Commission for Property Law, worked to safeguard Tunisian landholdings and modernise farming methods. He also advocated measures to make credit more easily available to small farmers and to build up a resilient social infrastructure of cooperatives. Provident societies could be established following a 1907 decree, but their formalities and restrictions meant that funding for farmers was both limited and slow. In 1913, he spoke in favour of the creation of the Tunisian Chamber of Agriculture to represent the interests of small farmers and retailers to the government.

The French protectorate of Tunisia allowed tariff-free imports for French goods, which often undercut local manufacturers. Foreign industries set up in Tunisia, and local craftsmen and manufacturers could not complete. The general economic decline this created was greatly resented by Zaouche. He argued forcefully for education and training to allow local businesses to reskill, and for access to credit on modest terms to allow them to retool and explore new markets. He also spoke in favour of tariff protection for local markets and export incentives for Tunisian manufacturers to export into French Algeria. He argued for comprehensive legislation to protect workers, providing for equality in access to positions, salaries and taxation; for the creation of professional bodies and the establishment of a self-regulating industrial and commercial sector. He foresaw new cooperatives, new municipal institutions and new, modern technical education as the keys to future success. He was instrumental in getting the small shopkeepers (Djerbiens) to form a cooperative to buy goods in bulk at a discount. He also created the Es-Saadia cooperative, with more than 800 balgha-makers in Tunis and more than 100 in Kairouan, purchasing raw materials and supporting training and the well-being of its members. The success of the Es-Saadia cooperative encouraged the grocers and ironmongers to for a Commercial Union that he led himself. Parallel social organisations emerged in other sectors, including Le Progrès (woolen cloth) in 1910, Ikbal (foodstuffs) in 1911, Les Sociétés tunisiennes in 1912, Itidal (glassware) in 1913, l'Aide mutuelle (grains et spices) in 1914 and La Renaissance économique (farming equipment) in 1920.

== The Jellaz Affair ==
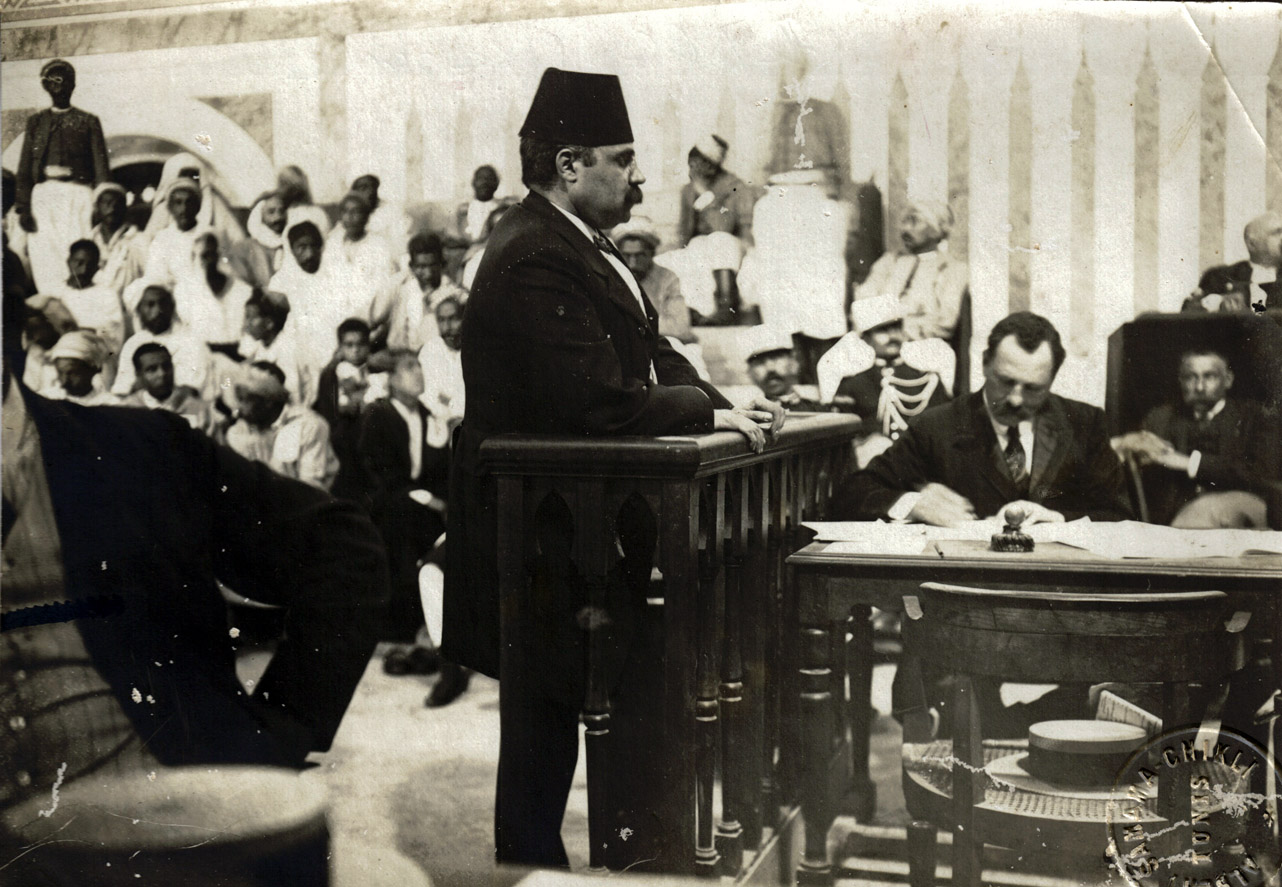
Abdeljelil Zaouche during the Jellaz trial

The Jellaz Affair was a controversy which broke out in 1911 over a proposal by the City Council of Tunis to register the land. Zaouche, a member of the Council, raised the alarm at one of its sessions, warning of a huge public backlash. The Council withdrew the proposal, and Zaouche went to the cemetery in person to try and prevent violence, but such was the anger and tension that several days of riots across the city, in which several people lost their lives.

Victor de Carnières, leader of the French colonists and owner of the newspaper Colon français, used the edition of 26 November 1911 to accuse Zaouche of being the main instigator of the disturbances. On 30 November, Zaouche replied in his own newspaper, Le Tunisien, accusing Carnières of defamation. After unsuccessful attempts to have these accusations dealt with by other administrative or judicial means, Zaouche brought a case against him. Carnières' defence was that he was relying on rumours he had picked up from Tunisians. The presiding judge described Zaouche as 'a man of good', and the Attorney General described his actions as worthy only of praise. Nevertheless, the court simply dismissed the case on the grounds that anything damaging Carnières had said about Zaouche was only of secondary importance, and that his primary aim had been to defend French interests. The court also ruled that Zaouche should pay the costs of the action, which tended to support the view among colonists that the accusations were well-founded. Exonerated by the court, Carnières continued his attacks on Zaouche and the Young Tunisians in his newspaper. Zaouche pursued the matter at the Court of Appeal in Algiers, where Carnières' standing in the settler community in Tunis counted for less. The Algiers court found in Zaouche's favour and awarded him costs with interest against Carnières, taking into account his bad faith and his intention to defame. However, the court also decided, 'considering the circumstances', not to announce its decision in the Tunis newspapers, which meant that it went largely unnoticed.

== High office ==
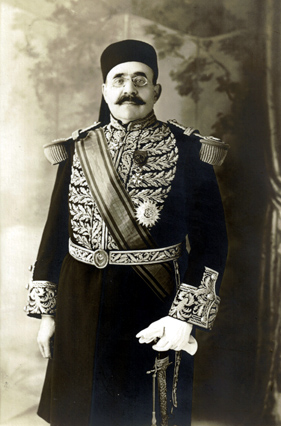
Zaouche in ministerial uniform

From April 1917, Zaouche served for 17 years as caïd of Sousse, but did not abandon the cause of the national movement. He published many reports on education and agriculture, and created special support funds for the farmers of the Sahel and encouraged the planting of olive trees.

On 18 May 1934, he became Mayor of Tunis, and on 7 October 1935, Minister of the Pen. From April 1936 until the confrontation with the French Resident General Esteva in December 1942, he was Minister of Justice. He resigned from this position in protest, together with all the other ministers in the cabinet of Hédi Lakhoua at the request of the Bey.

Founder of the co-operative movement, reformer, lawyer, editor, journalist, businessman and minister, Zaouche was also one of the most outspoken Young Tunisians when it came to criticising traditional religion. He was somewhat isolated from the Sadikian group among the Young Tunisians because he spent his time in mainstream French institutions. His old opponent, the colonist leader Victor de Carnières hailed him as “Young Tunisian, hothouse plant, two centuries ahead of his co-religionists.”

== Bibliography ==
=== Biographies ===
- Tawfik Ayadi, Mouvement réformiste et mouvements populaires à Tunis, éd. Université de Tunis, Tunis, 1986
- Djilani Ben Haj Yahya et Mohamed Marzouki, La bataille du Djellaz, éd. Société tunisienne de diffusion, Tunis, 1974
- Nazli Hafsia, Les premiers modernistes tunisiens. Abdeljelil Zaouche. 1873–1947, éd. MIM, Tunis, 2007 ISBN 978-9973-736-01-7
- Charles-André Julien, Colons français et Jeunes Tunisiens, éd. Julliard, Paris, 1972
- Sadok Zmerli, Figures tunisiennes. Les successeurs, éd. Maison tunisienne de l'édition, Tunis, 1967, p. 205–231

=== Works ===
- L'enseignement des indigènes, éd. Société anonyme de l'imprimerie rapide, Tunis, 1900
- Les Israélites et la justice tunisienne, éd. Société anonyme de l'imprimerie rapide, Tunis, 1906 (with Hassen Guellaty and Ali Bach Hamba)
- « Les aspirations des musulmans de Tunis », La Revue indigène, Paris, 1907
- La condition des métayers indigènes en Tunisie. Moyens d'améliorer cette condition, éd. Congrès de l'Afrique du nord, Paris, 1908
- Les métiers des villes et les salaires en Tunisie, éd. Congrès de l'Afrique du nord, Paris, 1908
- L'enseignement arabe en Tunisie, tome XX, éd. Société d'éditions maritimes et coloniales, Paris, 1932
- La question des terres et l'agriculture indigène, éd. Société anonyme de l'imprimerie rapide, Tunis, 1919
- Fiscalité et impôts de la medjba. Représentativité des indigènes, éd. Conférence consultative tunisienne, Tunis, 1909
