= Hassen Guellaty =

Tunisian lawyer, journalist, and political activist

- حسن القلاتي
- Born: 27 November 1880; Ksar el Boukhari, French Algeria
- Died: 1966 (aged 85–86)
- Citizenship: Tunisian
- Occupations: Lawyer, journalist, political activist
- Known for: Young Tunisians; co-founder of Destour

Hassen Guellaty (Arabic: حسن القلاتي; 27 November 1880 – 1966) was a Tunisian lawyer, journalist, and political activist. He was associated with the Young Tunisians movement, contributed to Le Tunisien, and was among the founders of the Destour party in 1920. In 1921, after breaking with the main Destour leadership, he founded the Parti réformiste destourien.

== Life and education ==
Guellaty was born in Ksar el Boukhari, in French Algeria. His father worked as a judicial interpreter and was posted to Sousse and later to Tunis in 1882. Guellaty attended the French-system school in Tunis later known as the Lycée Carnot de Tunis, while also studying classical Arabic with a teacher from the University of Ez-Zitouna. He obtained his baccalaureate in 1898 and later studied law at the University of Toulouse.

== Political activity ==
After returning to Tunis, Guellaty practised law on Rue de la Commission. The same address was later connected to the Cercle tunisien and to the editorial offices of Le Tunisien, a newspaper associated with the Young Tunisians movement. In 1905, he married Fatma Sfar, daughter of the reformist figure Béchir Sfar.

Guellaty was involved in the political agitation around the Djellaz incident in 1911 and the Tunis tram boycott in 1912. During the French authorities' repression of Young Tunisian leaders, he was arrested and temporarily expelled to Algeria on 12 March 1912.

In 1920, Guellaty helped found the Destour party and chaired its Economic Affairs Commission. He contributed to La Tunisie martyre, a manifesto setting out constitutional demands under the French Protectorate. He also took part in Destour delegations to Paris, where the party presented its demands to French authorities.

Guellaty later split from the main Destour leadership. In 1920, he founded the Société Renaissance Économique, an organization intended to provide machinery to Tunisian farmers and train technicians in maintenance work. In 1921, he founded the Parti réformiste destourien. During the 1920s, the Parti réformiste distanced itself from the communist-affiliated CGTT.

== Cultural and publishing activity ==
Guellaty was active in the Khaldounia, an educational association founded in Tunis in 1896 to complement the Zitouna curriculum with modern subjects taught in Arabic.

His published work included La justice tunisienne, issued in 1909 as part of the Bibliothèque du Tunisien series.

== Publications ==
- La justice tunisienne. Tunis, 1909.

== See also ==
- Béchir Sfar
- Ali Bach Hamba
- Young Tunisians
- Le Tunisien
- Khaldounia
- Destour
