= Al-Hadhira =

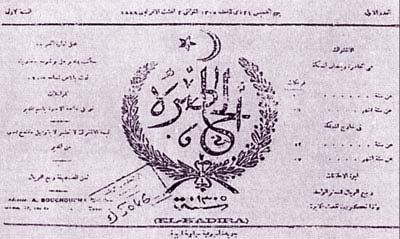
First edition of Al-Hadira (1888).

Al-Hadira (also spelled El-Hadhira, or al-ḥāḍira; Arabic: الحاضرة) was the first private Arabic newspaper in Tunisia. It was founded in 1888 by reformist Muhammad al-Sanusi, among others. It was used as a forum for broad discussion of modern political issues and social reform in the country during the Beylical era of Tunisia's modern history. It ceased publishing in 1911.

The paper is associated with the Young Tunisians movement. It eventually came to change its editorial line to align more with the ruling French colonial administration, focusing on the positive aspects of the French protectorate over Tunisia, which helped to fund it.

== See also ==
- Le Tunisien
