= Béchir Sfar =

Tunisian nationalist campaigner and politician

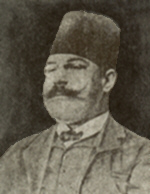
- portrait of Béchir Sfar
- Born: February 27, 1856; Tunis
- Died: March 1, 1917 (aged 61); Tunis
- Occupations: Nationalist leader and politician

Béchir Sfar (البشير صفر), (27 February 1856, Tunis - 1 March 1917, Tunis), was a Tunisian nationalist campaigner and politician.

== Youth and early career ==
Sfar's father was originally from Mahdia, where he served as caïd. He was also a high-ranking officer in the army of the Bey of Tunis, and later worked in the Tunisian War Ministry. Béchir Sfar himself was born in Tunis. He was in the first graduating class of the Collège Sadiki and then went to Paris to continue his studies at the lycée Saint-Louis. In 1881, when France established a protectorate over Tunis, he interrupted his studies and returned home, and took up a government post in June of that year. In 1882 he became head of the accounting division in the office of the Grand vizier, a post he held until 1891. During these years he became involved in a number of cultural institutions, and founded the Khaldounia association.

For a number of years he headed the Habous Council which was responsible for land donated by benefactors and held in trust for public benefit. However a series of colonial laws began allowing the French to acquire growing amounts of habous land. and in some instances Tunisians occupying or working the land were displaced. In 1898 Sfar resigned from his position on the Habous Council in protest at these enforced sales to French colonists.

== Reform activities ==
Sfar's career in politics as an active nationalist reformer began on 2 August 1888 when he founded the newspaper El Hadhira (The Capital), managed by another member of the Khaldounia association, Ali Bouchoucha. In his articles, he called on his fellow Tunisians, some of whom were fascinated by France, to “prevent themselves from falling into a condition of excess, where they would deny their Muslim Arab culture and lose their identity.” He believed that Tunisian national renewal could only be achieved through education, exposing young people to Islamic culture alongside the sciences, economics, history, geography and modern languages.

In 1907, Sfar co-founded the Young Tunisian movement with Ali Bach Hamba and his brother Mohamed.

Later in 1907 he visited Egypt, where his experiences left a strong impression on him. Like Tunisia, Egypt was a protectorate at the time (of Britain), but the differences with Tunisia were marked: the effects of modern education were everywhere to be seen in public life, while industry, agriculture and infrastructure were in the hands of Egyptians, as were most official posts.

The Young Turk Revolution of 1908 in the Ottoman Empire left Sfar and his colleagues in this group increasingly isolated from the more traditional religious authorities in Tunisia who had previously welcomed his reform ideas; the orientation of the Young Tunisians was towards the Young Turks, while the ulama supported Abdul Hamid II.

== Confrontation with the colonists ==
In his speech before the Resident General in 1906, Sfar declared:

"The Muslim population appreciates, to the proper extent, the useful improvements and reforms accomplished by the Protectorate government. It is aware, too, of the measures the government is taking to advance charitable works and public assistance. But it’s recognition if these things would be all the stronger if, in relieving poverty, our government would seriously study the means of preventing it. Professional, commercial and agricultural education, made widely available to the native population; effective training and protection for Tunisian labour; revival of local industries by customs controls and other measures; and finally the preservation of native land rights; these, Mr. Resident General, in our humble opinion, are the many proper measures which will reduce or end the economic crisis which is bearing down on Muslim society today.”

This speech irked the French colonists who replied in virulent terms in their newspapers, Le Colon français and La Tunisie française. However, in France, liberals supported Sfar in Le Temps, and said it was necessary to take account of the demands raised by the Young Tunisians, who were imbued with the principles of the French Revolution. Despite this support, Sfar was given the post of caïd of Sousse to get him out of Tunis. On his death, the position of caid was taken by Abdeljelil Zaouche.

== Family ==
Sfar had a son, Mustapha (born 1892) and a daughter, Fatma. Fatma's husband was Hassen Guellaty, one of the founders of the Destour party, their granddaughter Sophia ben Romdhane married Slaheddine Caid Essebsi, brother of Tunisian President Beji Caid Essebsi., and their Great Grand Daughter is Author and media personality Sofia Guellaty.

== See also ==
- Tahar Sfar
- Rachid Sfar
