= Ali Bach Hamba =

Tunisian journalist and politician

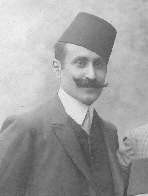
Ali Bach Hamba

Ali Bach Hamba (1876 - 29 October 1918) was a Tunisian lawyer, journalist and politician. He co-founded the Young Tunisians with Béchir Sfar in 1907.

== Biography ==
Bach Hamba was born in 1876 in Tunis into a family of Turkish origin, his brother, Mohamed Bach Hamba, was the editor of "Revue du Maghreb". He studied at the Sadiki College prior to achieving a master's and then a doctorate in law at the Aix-Marseille University. In 1907 he and Béchir Sfar created a political group, the Young Tunisians (influenced by the Young Turks), with a French language weekly, "Le Tunisien", to speak for the interests of their countrymen. They sought for equality and demanded for rights in accordance with the terms of the protectorate. In 1909 they were joined by Abdelaziz Thâalbi, and the movement acquired a religious as well as a constitutional character, with an Arabic as well as a French edition of "Le Tunisien". The popularity of the new party was demonstrated in 1911, when it protested against the Italian invasion of Libya. In November 1911, a riot, quelled by troops, led to the proclamation of a state of siege. When in February 1912 an Italian tram-driver knocked down and killed a child, the Tunis Tram Boycott was organised, and Tunisian employees fought for equal pay with the Italian personnel. The government declared there had been a political plot and exiled Bach Hamba and Thaalbi. This popular protest and the workers’ demands was the first clear manifestation of a Tunisian national consciousness.

== See also ==
- Tunisian national movement

== Bibliography ==
- Brett, Michael (1984), "The Maghrib: 1905-1914", in Crowder, Michael (ed.), The Cambridge History of Africa: Volume 7 c. 1905-c.1940, Cambridge University Press, ISBN 0521225051.
- Derrick, Jonathan (2008), Africa's "Agitators": Militant Anti-colonialism in Africa and the West, 1918-1939, Columbia University Press, ISBN 978-0231700566.
- Ling, Dwight L. (1979), Morocco and Tunisia: A Comparative History, University Press of America, ISBN 0819108731.
- Puaux, Gabriel (1954), "Essai de psychanalyse des protectorats nord-africains", Politique étrangère, 1 (19): 11–28, doi:10.3406/polit.1954.2634
