= Mohamed Bach Hamba =

Mohamed Bach Hamba (1881-1920) was a Tunisian nationalist writer and one of the leaders of the Young Tunisians. He was the editor of the "Revue du Maghreb", a monthly magazine, which demanded reforms under French rule.

== Biography ==
Mohamed Bach Hamba was born in 1881 into a family of Turkish origin; his brother, Ali Bach Hamba, was a co-founder of the Young Tunisians. After travelling in Constantinople, in May 1916, Bach Hamba launched the nationalist "Revue du Maghreb" in Geneva. This monthly magazine aimed at calling for reforms in Tunisia and Algeria, amounting to equality for all under French rule. However, copies that were sent to Tunisia were often confiscated due to its strong criticisms of the existing colonial order. The magazine, which was subsidised by Turkey, also went further and called for self-determination. In 1918, Bach Hamba published a memoir under the title "Le Peuple algéro-tunisien et la France" where he denounced the policy of "participation" with the French Protectorate and argues for the independence of the Algerian-Tunisian people. He died on 27 December 1920, and was buried in the cemetery of Hasenheide southeast of Berlin.

== Publications ==
- Le Peuple algéro-tunisien et la France (1918)

== Bibliography ==
- Brett, Michael (1984), "The Maghrib", in Roberts, A. D. (ed.), The Cambridge History of Africa: Volume 7: from 1905 to 1940, Cambridge University Press, pp. 267–328, ISBN 0521225051.
- Derrick, Jonathan (2008), Africa's "Agitators": Militant Anti-colonialism in Africa and the West, 1918-1939, Columbia University Press, ISBN 978-0231700566.
- Ling, Dwight L. (1979), Morocco and Tunisia: A Comparative History, University Press of America, ISBN 0819108731.
- Sraieb, Noureddine (1971), "Note sur les dirigeants politiques et syndicalistes tunisiens de 1920 à 1934", Revue de l'Occident musulman et de la Méditerranée, 9 (9): 91–118, doi:10.3406/remmm.1971.1102
