= 1947 Sfax general strike =

1947 Sfax General Strike
- Events of 5 August 1947; Part of Tunisian national movement
- Date: 4–5 August 1947
- Location: Sfax, French Tunisia
- Caused by: Wage disputes, exclusion of the UGTT from the wage commission, unemployment and poor working conditions
- Goals: Guaranteed minimum wage, higher wages and improved working conditions
- Methods: General strike, demonstrations and railway blockade
- Result: Strike suppressed

Parties
Tunisian workers and trade unionists: Tunisian General Labour Union	(France) French colonial authorities

Lead figures
Habib Achour, Farhat Hached	Jean Mons, Raymond Duval, Émile Nullet

Number
3,000–4,000 demonstrators in Sfax	French colonial military and police forces

Casualties
- Deaths: 30
- Injuries: 150
- Habib Achour was among the wounded.

The 1947 Sfax General Strike was a major labour strike that took place in Sfax, Tunisia, during the French protectorate. Organized by the Tunisian General Labour Union (UGTT) and led locally by trade unionist Habib Achour on 4 August 1947, the strike sought higher wages, a guaranteed minimum wage and improved working conditions for Tunisian workers. It culminated in a violent confrontation with French colonial forces on 5 August, resulting in approximately 30 deaths and numerous injuries.
