= Jellaz Affair =

1911 violent confrontation in Tunisia

The Jellaz Affair (Arabic: أحداث ٱلجلّاز Aḥdāth ul-Jallāz) (French: Affaire du Djellaz) was a violent confrontation in November 1911 between Tunisian protesters and the authorities of the French Protectorate of Tunisia which began at the Jellaz Cemetery. Over the course of two days, it became a series of fights and attacks in the streets, primarily involving Tunisians and Italian settlers. It was the most serious outbreak of violence in Tunis, and the first time French soldiers fired on the civilian population, since the establishment of the Protectorate in 1881. It was therefore a critical juncture in the development of the Tunisian nationalist movement.

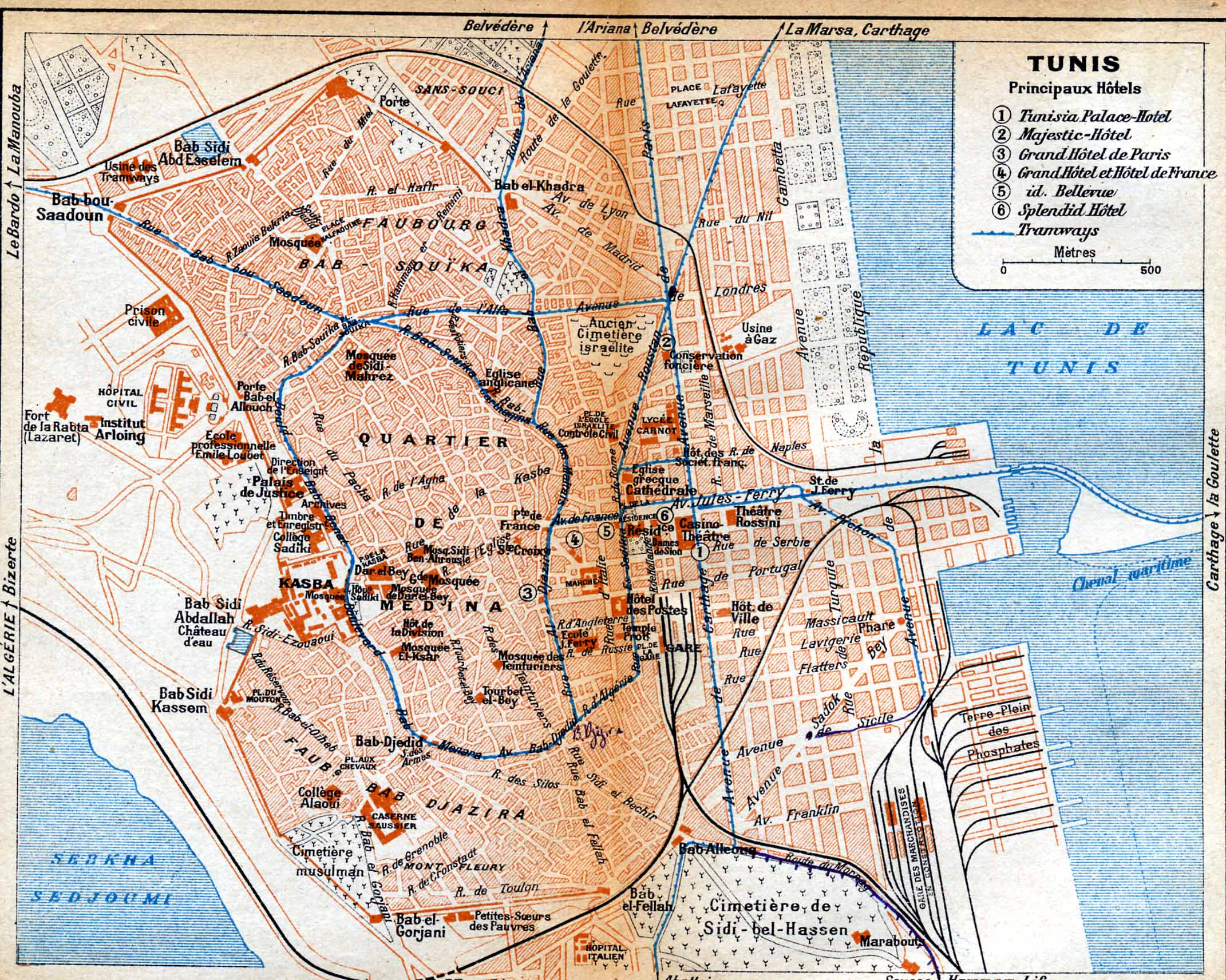
Plan of Tunis 1916 showing the Arab city to the left, the European areas to the right, and Jellaz cemetery to the south, marked 'cimitière de Sidi-bel-Hassen'

== Background ==
Several factors led to the escalation of tension in Tunis in the months before November 1911.

=== Religious trusts and land ownership ===
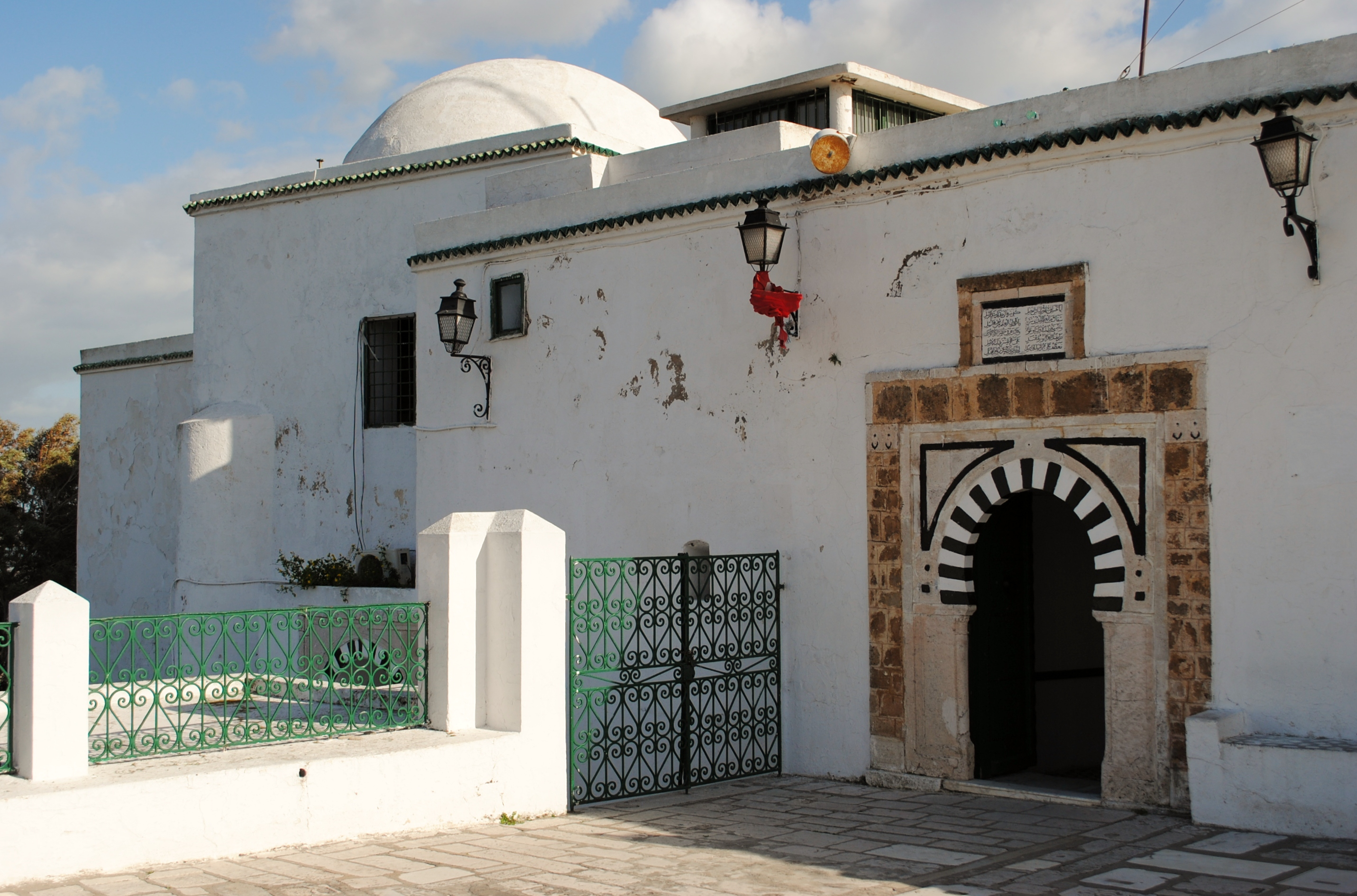
mausoleum of Sidi Abul Hasan ash-Shadhili

The Jellaz cemetery was of great religious and cultural significance to Tunisians. It was named after Sheikh Abu Abdallah Muhammad Taj ad-Din al-Jallaz (d.1205) who had acquired the land and endowed it as a religious trust, or habous (Arabic: حبوس) (known in many other countries as a waqf (Arabic: وقف)). On the cemetery hill stood the first zawiya founded by the medieval Moroccan sufi Abul Hasan ash-Shadhili, and in 1911 this was the spiritual base for some 5,000 men in Tunis who were members of the Shadhili sufi order he founded. Another zawiya, of Sidi Al Bashir, also stood in the cemetery, and many of the most illustrious families of Tunis had their dead relatives buried there. Under Islamic law, habous property was donated by a benefactor and held in trust for some public benefit; once in trust it could not be bought or sold. However a series of colonial laws since the 1880s had allowed the French in Tunisia to acquire the title or use of growing amounts of habous land. Thus land endowed for the benefit of local communities steadily came under the private control of French landlords and in some instances Tunisians occupying or working the land were displaced.

=== Nationality laws ===
Just as changes to the ownership of habous eroded a long-established religious institution and advanced French property rights, so changes to nationality law were divisive of the population. On 3 October 1910, a French Presidential decree significantly broadened the grounds for claiming French nationality, to include volunteering for military services; holding two degrees or the title of doctor of medicine or of law; marrying a French woman, or exceptional service to the French state. This law did not make any explicit provision for Tunisians of the Jewish community, but was understood in Tunisia to be largely of interest to them, It was therefore seen by Arab nationalists as divisive since it encouraged a group of native-born Tunisians to renounce their loyalty to their homeland and identify with the occupier.

=== Agadir and Tripoli ===
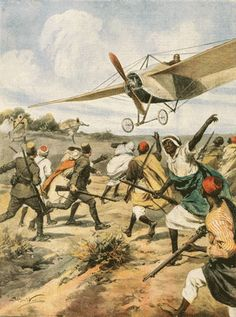
Italian aircraft in action in Libya

Developments in neighbouring countries intensified a feeling of anger and injustice among Tunisian Muslims in 1911. First, a rebellion against the Sultan of Morocco led France to deploy troops in Fez in April, precipitating the Agadir Crisis, and as a result, France called up troops in Tunisia to fight in Morocco. As France took effective control there, the other European powers demanded to be 'compensated' in regions they considered vital to their interests, and this led to an Italian declaration of war on the Ottoman Empire on 29 September 1911, followed by the invasion of Libya. Libyan refugees were soon crossing the border into Tunisia, fleeing the invasion.

=== Tensions with the Italian community ===
Tensions between Muslim Arabs and Italians in Tunis played a major role in the Jellaz Affair. Italian immigration to Tunisia had grown rapidly under the French Protectorate, and by 1900, Italians made up around seven-eighths of the colony's European population of 80,000 people. In 1903, the Italian consul calculated that here were 80,000 Italians alone, while a 1910 estimate indicated that there were 105,000 Italians in Tunisia, compared with only 35,000 French people. Many Italians arrived in Tunisia poor and they were banned from employment on public works or in the colonial government unless they adopted French citizenship. Instead they often pursued the trades they had followed in Italy - fishermen, shopkeepers, labourers, farmers and miners. These and similar occupations meant that they were often likely to find themselves in competition with native Tunisian workers and traders.

== Abortive registration of Jellaz land ==
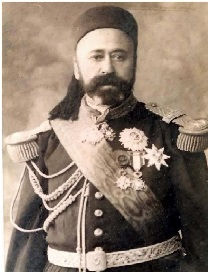
Sadok Ghileb, Mayor of Tunis

As a habous, the Jellaz cemetery was administered by a special agency, but the municipality of Tunis had, some twenty years previously, acquired the responsibility for protecting and maintaining it. However, in 1911, the cemetery was not well-managed and not clearly demarcated from other properties around it, so in various places the graves gave way to small quarries and skid-roads for felled trees. In addition, builders routinely pilfered materials from the cemetery for use in construction projects elsewhere.

On 26 September, the people of the city learned that the municipality of Tunis was planning to remove the cemetery from the habous agency and register it as its own property. This was being done with the stated intention of protecting it against the encroachments it was suffering. However, certain individual French members of the municipal council had also submitted applications to register parcels of cemetery land in their own names. The municipality was a mixed institution - the mayor was a Tunisian Muslim, Sadok Ghileb, but his two deputies were French, and eight of the seventeen seats on the municipal council were reserved for French people. Ghileb had not been consulted about the proposed registration of the Jellaz cemetery land, and the Deputy Mayor Jean-Baptiste Curtelin tried to keep the matter off the agenda when the municipal council met on 2 November. Nevertheless Abdeljelil Zaouche spoke vehemently against the registration and in the end, the council agreed to abandon the idea. The plan had been to finalise the application for registration on 7 November, but the council voted, instead, to withdraw the application altogether. This decision was relayed to the public at a large meeting at the Zaytuna Mosque.

However by this time, Ghileb had ensured that posters were put up all across Tunis, urging people to attend the meeting on 7 November to make their objections known, as the law provided for. While the council was at odds over what to do, rumours were spreading in Tunis. It was widely believed that the municipality intended to demolish part of the cemetery to build a tramway - perhaps based on the fact that a few years previously, in Casablanca, the French authorities had indeed built a tramway through a Muslim cemetery. Having mobilised people to oppose the registration, insufficient efforts may have made to inform them that it was being abandoned, or perhaps this news was simply not sufficient to allay popular outrage. While all this as going on, anger was spreading in Tunis about the Italian invasion of Libya. Italy's ultimatum to the Ottoman Empire was issued just a few days after the news broke of the registration plans, and Italy proclaimed its annexation of Libya on 5 November, two days before the registration had been scheduled.

== Events on 7 November ==
On 7 November, a survey was due to be undertaken to establish the boundaries of the cemetery land. The police had learned that a demonstration was planned for that morning at the cemetery, so at six o'clock in the morning, Police Commissioner Espiau went to the cemetery with 150 officers, and found some 2,000 people already gathered there near the gates. A small number of people were arrested for obstructing the police as they made their way to the cemetery. Although posters calling people to defend the cemetery had been put up across the city, most of the demonstrators who gathered on 7 November were local people who lived near the cemetery.

Soon, administrators of the agency which managed the habous arrived, along with various other Tunisian notables, and told the crowd that the municipality had decided to drop its application to register the land. At seven o'clock the surveyors from the land office appeared, and posted the minutes of the meeting cancelling the application to register. All of this happened without incident, and many of the crowd began to disperse. The surveyors left, and Espiau sent his officers away, except for a dozen which he kept on duty at or near the cemetery.

According to the French press, it was only after this official business had been completed that serious trouble began. The Mayor of Tunis, Sadok Ghileb, arrived at the cemetery, and crowds pressed around him, demanding that he have the gates of the cemetery opened. To reassure them, he did so and went inside with a number of them. The crowd was not calmed however, and began demanding the release of those who had been arrested earlier in the morning. Ghileb then sent for Espiau, who returned to the cemetery and gave the crowd assurances about the release of those being detained. The crowd however continued to grow larger and angrier, and Espiau decided to go and bring police reinforcements. He made his way with difficulty through the mass of people, and as he headed off he was struck from behind by a number of stones. A scuffle began, with the police trying to get Espiau and Ghileb safely away from the cemetery, striking protesters with their batons while the crowd threw pieces of rubble at them. Brigadier François Franchi was killed, while two police inspectors and four or five other officers were injured. The French press reported that the police fired on the crowd, but did not report numbers of dead and injured among the protesters at the cemetery. Police were mustered from stations in other parts of the city but they were unable to gain control of the situation.

As the fighting spread, both the zouaves and the chasseurs d'Afrique were called out to restore order. The zouaves formed a line between the city and the cemetery, preventing more protesters who were now crowding the streets from reaching it. Abdeljelil Zaouche tried to urge calm, but the protesters still in the cemetery, behind the zouaves, began hurling stones at them. The zouaves made a half-turn and fired on the crowd, killing around fifteen people. As the morning progressed, there were other attacks on Europeans in different parts of the city, some leading to fatalities and others to serious injury. Fighting was particularly intense in the area between Bab Jedid and Bab Alioua, where the population was a mix of Tunisians and Italians. The Italians barricaded themselves in their houses, and those with weapons used them, shooting down from their balconies into the streets. At some point a Tunisian boy, Rebah Degla, was killed by an Italian bullet, and this provoked greater anger against the Italians across the city.

A detachment of sixty zouaves under Lieutenant Pinelli was attacked with stones, and responded by fixing bayonets and charging the crowd. As the newspaper Le Temps put it (9 November 1911) 'not a single bayonet had not been reddened with blood.' At around ten o'clock the Attorney General found himself surrounded by a threatening crowd which refused to disperse. Again the zouaves arrived and managed to rescue him, this time by firing into the air. As fighting continued here and there across the city, the chasseurs d'Afrique charged with drawn sabres at eleven o'clock near Bab Jedid. For the most part, order had been restored across the city by one o'clock in the afternoon.

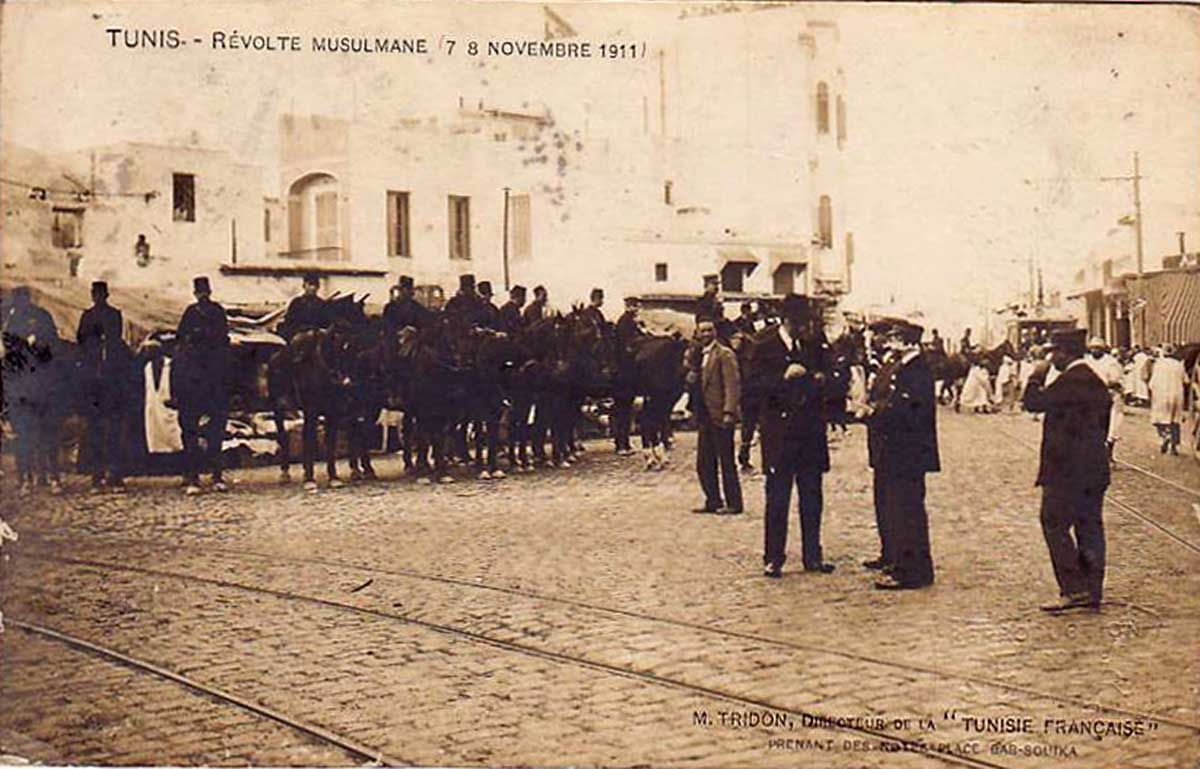
Cavalry on the square at Bab Souika during the disturbances

Here and there across the city, there were attacks and fights during the afternoon. Mostly these were isolated, though they led to more deaths. More fighting occurred at Bab Souika, where the killing of an Italian brought 600 other Italians out to avenge him until they were driven off by the artillery. When two Italians were brutally killed at Halfaouine, fifty others massed to fight with Arabs, and had to be driven off with live rounds, which killed another. In the afternoon, more troops arrived from Bizerte and Hammam-Lif so that by evening, there were 1,000 soldiers deployed across the city maintaining an uneasy calm. The city was placed under curfew from nine in the evening, and newspapers were banned. All cafes were forbidden to open, and all licences to carry weapons were summarily revoked. According to the newspaper 'Le Temps' (10/11/1911) that night there were three French and four Italian dead. The number of Arabs dead was reported as ten.

== Events on 8 November ==
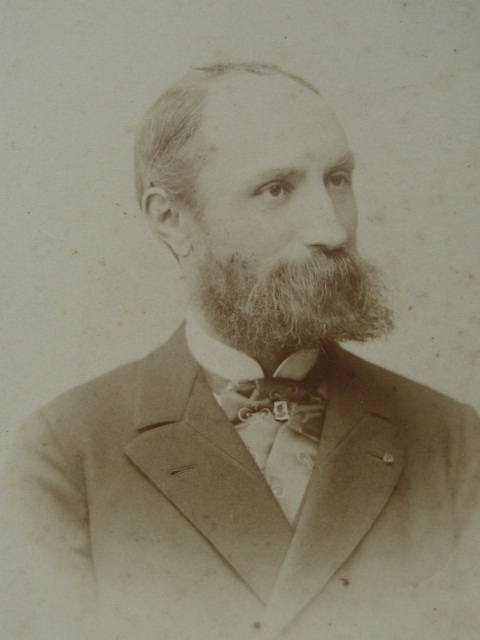
Resident-General Gabriel Alapetite

Levels of violence were much lower the following day. A Norwegian sailor was killed at El Aouina on the road to La Goulette. More fighting took place between Arabs and Italians - in the morning three Italians were killed at Bab Souika. A group of 200 Italians tried to prevent Arabs from crossing the square at Bab Cartagena, and in the ensuing fights, several Arabs were maltreated.

Given the anti-Italian character of much of the violence in Tunis, the Italian Consul-General, Bottesini, had taken refuge with his family at the home of the French Resident-General, Gabriel Alapetite on the night of 7 November. The next morning, a group of Italian demonstrators came to find him, asking him to secure the release of all the Italians who had been arrested the day before from the Resident-General. He attempted to do so but his request was turned down and the demonstration dispersed by troops.

For the rest of the day, patrols of cavalry and infantry swept the streets, arresting anyone they found armed and sending any Tunisians bearing weapons to the summary justice of the traditional driba tribunal. Groups of Tunisians were still gathering on the streets, but were chased off by the army.

Immediately after the disturbances the Resident-General ordered an enquiry, on which the French press later largely relied for its account of the events.

== Trials and sentences ==
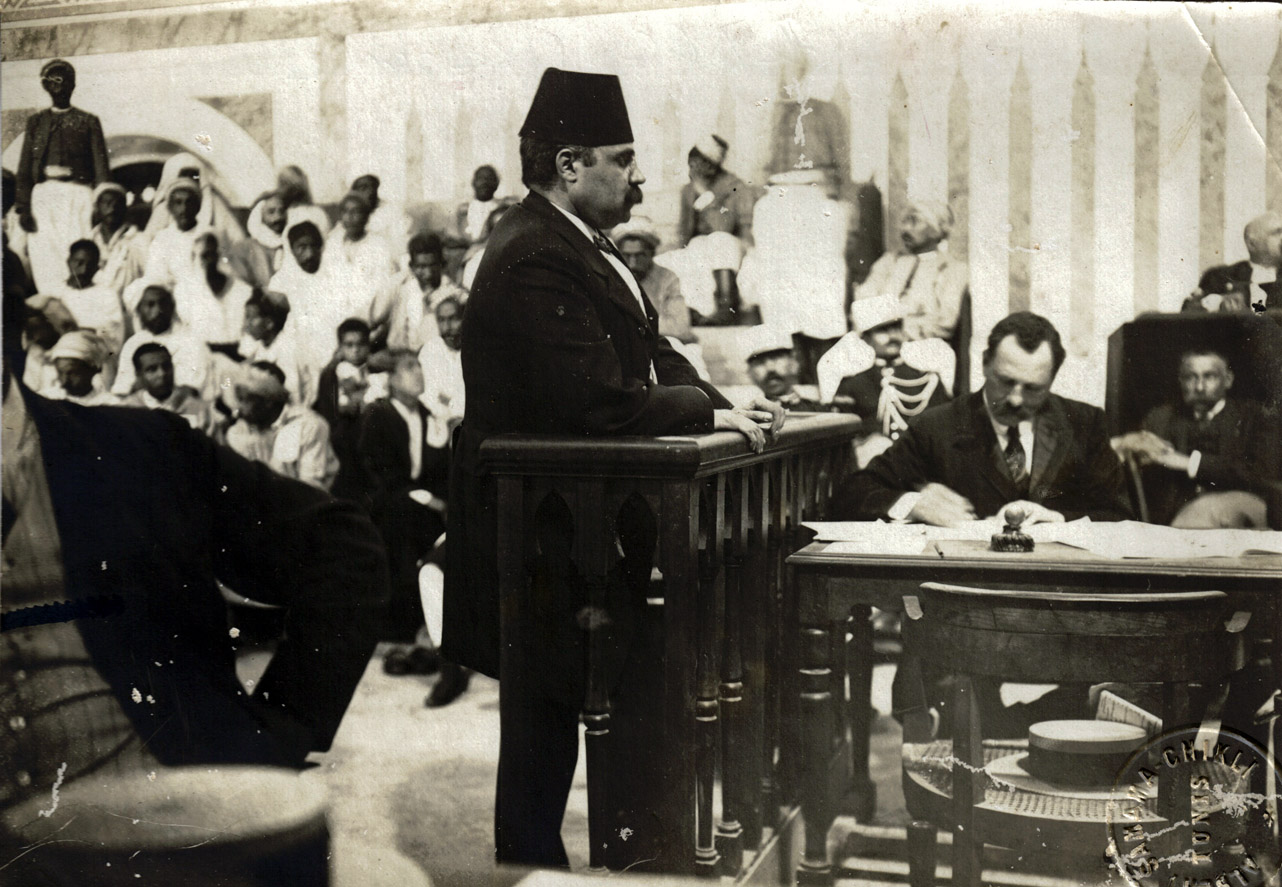
Abdeljelil Zaouche during the Jellaz trial

The numbers dead were 8 Europeans, and an unknown number of Tunisians. Some eight hundred arrests were made and 71 cases were brought to trial.

=== Main criminal trial ===
Despite the efforts of the French authorities to link the Young Tunisians to the Jellaz events, none of the men found guilty of participating in the riots held leadership positions in the movement.

The main criminal trial opened on 3 June 1912 at the court house of Tunis, with Paul Dumas as presiding judge. The tribunal consisted of three magistrates and six assessors, of whom three were French and three Tunisian. The accused were charged with nineteen murders or attempted murders of Europeans, and defended by fourteen lawyers, none of whom was Tunisian. After seventeen hours of deliberation, the tribunal finally reached its verdict. Thirty-four of the accused were acquitted and two minors were committed to the supervision of their parents, but the charge of rebellion was upheld against thirty-two of the accused. Paul Dumas then pronounced seven death sentences for murder: Chedly El Guettari and Manoubi Djardjar, for the murder of Franchi at the Jellaz cemetery and various attempted murders; Abdallah Ouali, for the murder of Brayarda Di Bartholo; Mohammed Chedly, for the murder of Muccio; Mohammed Gharbi, for the attempted murder of Foatta and Soulet; Mohamed El Gabsi, for the attempted murder of Piatri Djilani; and Ben Abdullah, for the attempted murder of Durin. The court also sentenced Abdallah Ben Darmoul to forced labour for life and Hadj Ben Belgacem and Fredj Es-Soudani to ten and twenty years' hard labour respectively. Mohamed Lakhangi Belgacem, Ben Mohamed and Manoubi El Guettari were sentenced to between three and five years' hard labour, and the remaining defendants were sentenced to prison. Most of the death sentences were subsequently commuted to hard labour for life, but Djardjar and Guettari were guillotined.

=== Second criminal trial ===
The murder of a French colonist named Vanel and the attempted murder of six Italian cart drivers during the Jellaz incident came to court in August 1912. Three of the accused, Ali ben Ataya, Hassen Elghoul and Ali Bahli were found innocent, Of the guilty, Abdallah Ben Djeballah and Amor Ben Mabrouk were condemned to death, although their sentence was later commuted to hard labour for life. Mohamed Gara was also sentenced to hard labour for life, while Mohamed Ben Kaddour, Abdelkader Chtiqui and Mohamed Bouzgaia were given fifteen years' hard labour.

=== Defamation trial ===
The third trial was a civil matter arising from an accusation made on 26 November by Victor de Carnières in his newspaper Colon français, that Abdeljelil Zaouche, a leading member of the Young Tunisians, had led the riots and paid individuals to take part in them. On 30 November Zaouche replied in his own newspaper, Le Tunisien, accusing Carnières of defamation. After unsuccessful attempts to have these accusations dealt with by other administrative or judicial means, Zaouche brought a case against him. The case did not come before the court until 26 October 1912, after the criminal trials were over. Carnières' defence was that he was relying on rumours he had picked up from Tunisians. The presiding judge described Zaouche as 'a good man' and the Attorney General described his actions as worthy only of praise. Nevertheless the court simply dismissed the case on the grounds that anything damaging Carnières had said about Zaouche was only of secondary importance, and that his primary aim had been to defend French interests. The court also ruled that Zaouche should pay the costs of the action, which tended to support the view among colonists that the accusations were well-founded. Exonerated by the court, Carnières continued his attacks on Zaouche and the Young Tunisians in his newspaper. Zaouche pursued the matter at the Court of Appeal in Algiers, where Carnières' standing in the settler community in Tunis counted for less. The Algiers court found in Zaouche's favour and awarded him costs with interest against Carnières, taking into account his bad faith and his intention to defame. However the court also decided, 'considering the circumstances' not to announce its decision in the Tunis newspapers, which meant that it went largely unnoticed.

== Reactions and consequences ==
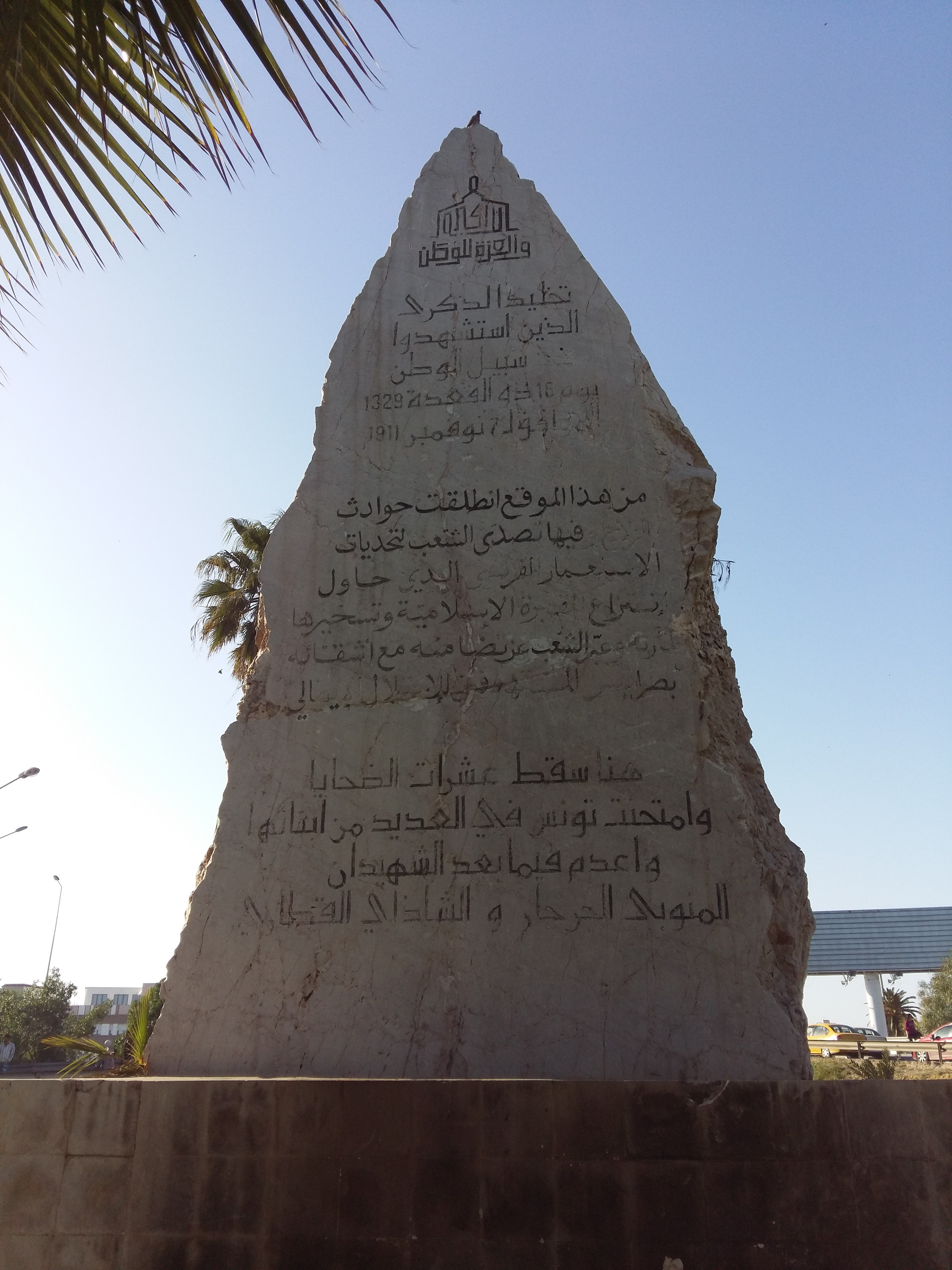
Monument in the Jellaz cemetery commemorating the incident

The French authorities found it appropriate to play up the importance of anti-Italian sentiment as a cause of the Jellaz Incident, such that, according to many official reports of the police and the administration, the disturbance was triggered not by the move to register the cemetery land, but by the shooting of the boy Rebah Degla by an Italian. Le Temps commented on 10 November that the cause of the disturbance was 'a false report' (sic) that the Jellaz land was to be registered. It described the protesters at the cemetery as 'fanaticised', stated that the 'real' cause of the problem was the 'overexcitement' of the Italian and Arab populations, and reassured its readers that the Jellaz incident was definitely not an anti-French riot. The newspapers referred to 'massacres' of Italians, portraying the events as almost entirely Arab assaults on Italians, or of two (non-French) tribes killing each other. They stressed that the misunderstanding over the cemetery land registration was unfortunate, but insufficient to explain what followed, and deplored the irrationality and religious fanaticism of the Tunisians.

In the wake of the Jellaz Incident, the French authorities imposed martial law on Tunis for almost a decade. Within months however, popular discontent manifested itself in the Tunis Tram Boycott. In response the authorities clamped down hard on the Young Tunisian movement several of whose leaders were exiled from the country. After this the movement, which had generally sought to work for the advancement of Tunisia in collaboration with France, became disillusioned with this approach. When the leaders returned from exile, they took a different political approach and founded the Destour party in 1920.

== See also ==
- History of French-era Tunisia
- Habib Bourguiba
- Tunisian naturalization issue
