= Jellaz Cemetery =

Muslim cemetery in Tunis, Tunisia

Jellaz Cemetery'
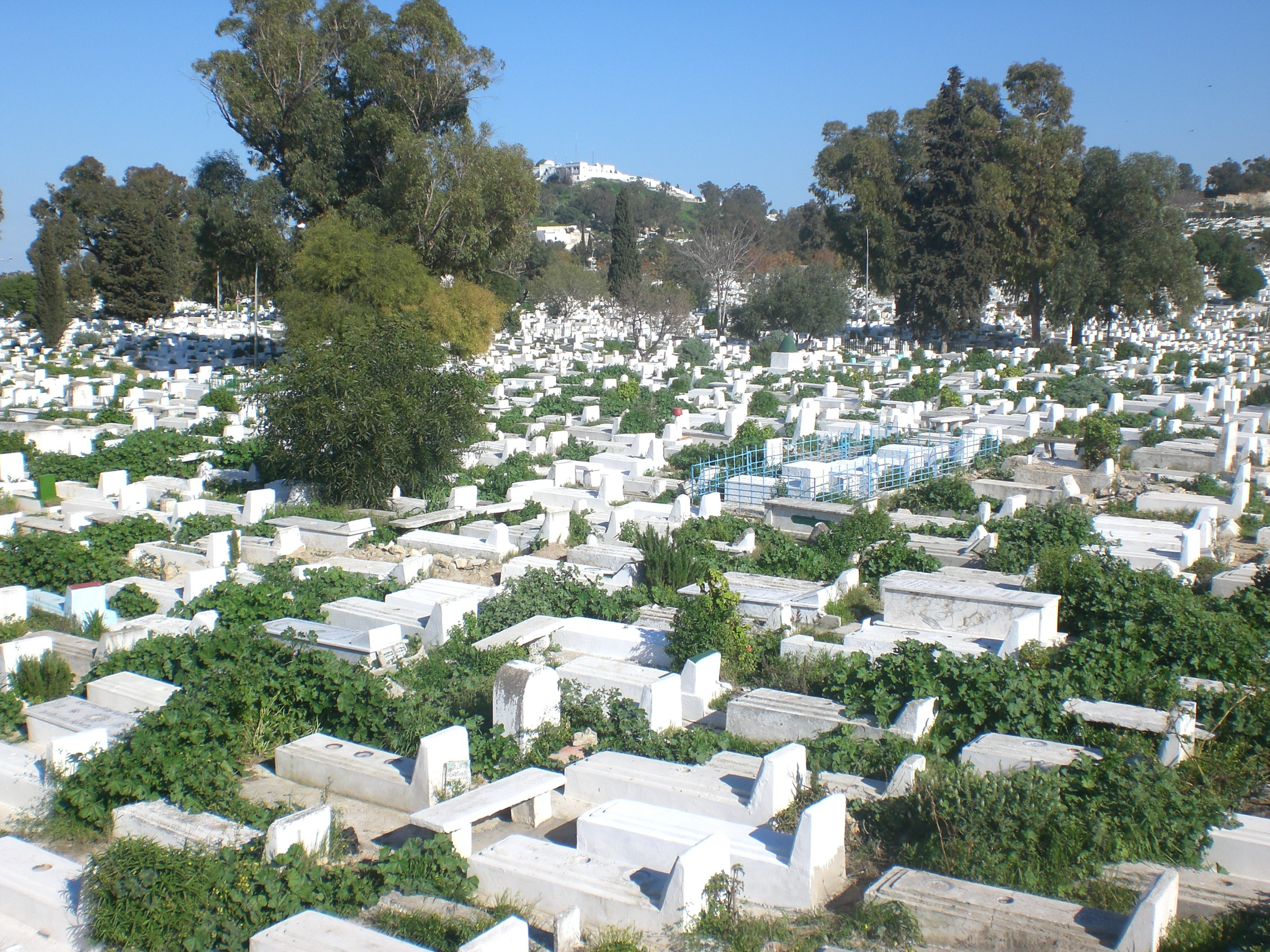
- Al-Jallaz cemetery; in the distance Sidi Belhassen Chadli
- Interactive map of Jellaz Cemetery'

Details
- Coordinates: 36°47′10″N 10°11′04″E

Jellaz Cemetery (Arabic: مقبرة الجلاز Maqbara al-Jalāz; also known as al-Jallaz and Cemetery Djalez) is a large hillside Muslim cemetery in Tunis, Tunisia, established in the thirteenth century. Located next to the bus station, the cemetery is the largest in the city. The Borj Ali Rais Ottoman fortress is visible from most places in the cemetery. Visiting the cemetery is a duty during Aid el Fitr at the end of Ramadan. Family members at this time clean and paint the tombs, which face Mecca.

In 1911, mass protests known as the Jellaz Affair demonstrations took place at the cemetery against the French, triggered by land registration and entitlement disputes. These in turn led to the Tunis Tram Boycott. A bloody confrontation took place after the burial of the wife of an eager propagandist of naturalisation and resulted in the death of 39 people, nine of them French and five Italian.

== Notable burials ==
- Chokri Belaid (1954–2013), lawyer and politician
- Moncef Bey (1881–1948), former Bey of Tunisia under French Rule
- Mohamed Brahmi (1955–2013), politician, founder and former leader of the People's Movement
- Beji Caid Essebsi (1926–2019), former president of Tunisia
- Bahi Ladgham (1913–1998), statesman
- Mongi Slim (1908–1969), diplomat
- Abdelmajid Tlemçani (1937–2020), footballer
- Fouad Mebazaa (1933–2025), former acting president of Tunisia
- Kafon (1983–2025), rapper
