= Tunis tram boycott =

Protest movement

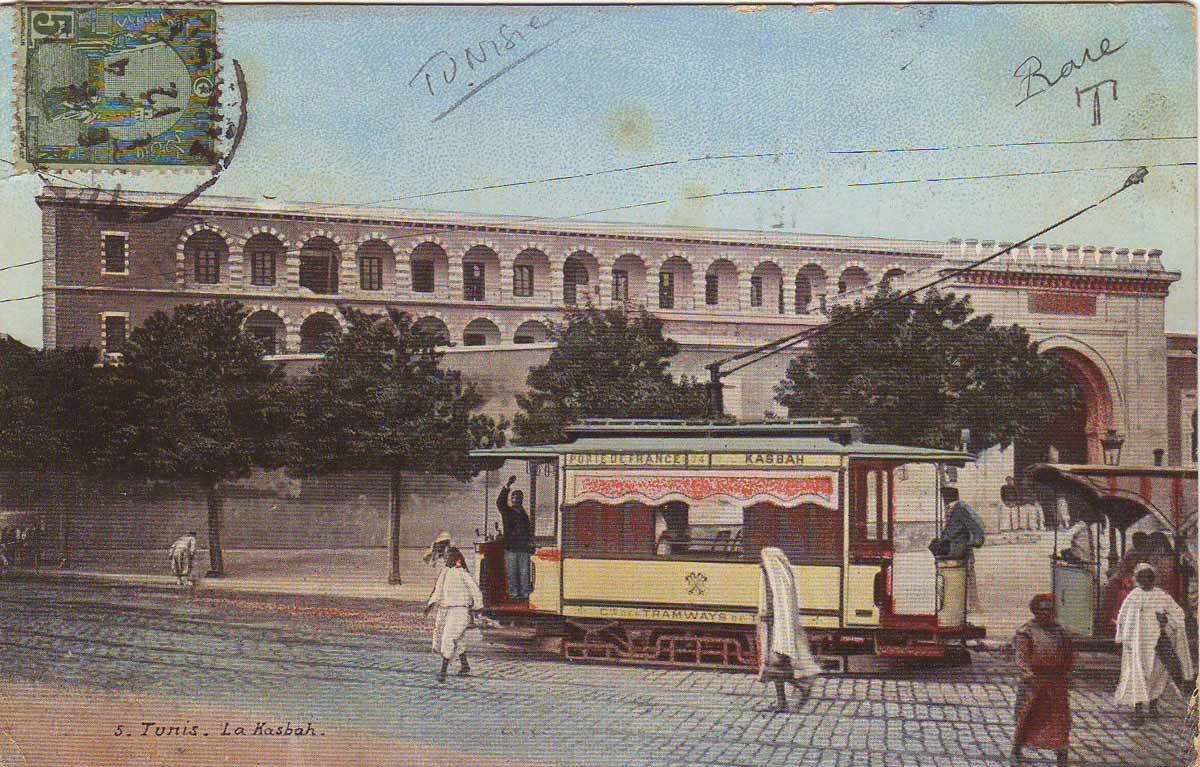
Tramway at the Kasbah in 1912

The Tunis tram boycott (Arabic: مقاطعة ترامواي تونس muqāṭa'a tramway tūnis) (French: boycott des tramways tunisois) was a mass protest which began in Tunis on 9 February 1912. For more than a month, Tunisian Arabs refused to ride on the city trams until a series of demands were met. The boycott, though unsuccessful, is considered an important step in the development of the Tunisian nationalist movement.

== Background ==
The boycott took place in an atmosphere of high tension between the Arab population of the city and Italian settlers, just two months after the violent riots and attacks of the Jellaz Affair. The murder cases arising from the Jellaz Affair had not yet gone to trial. Tunis was still under martial law and the Young Tunisians were under constant attack in the press.

Much of the tram system in Tunis had been run by an Italian firm, Florio Rubattino, until it was taken over by the French Compagnie des tramways de Tunis. Most of the personnel however remained Italian. The Italian drivers were particularly disliked by the Tunisians, for what they felt was a generally rude and hostile attitude, as well as reckless driving in busy areas of the city.

== February ==
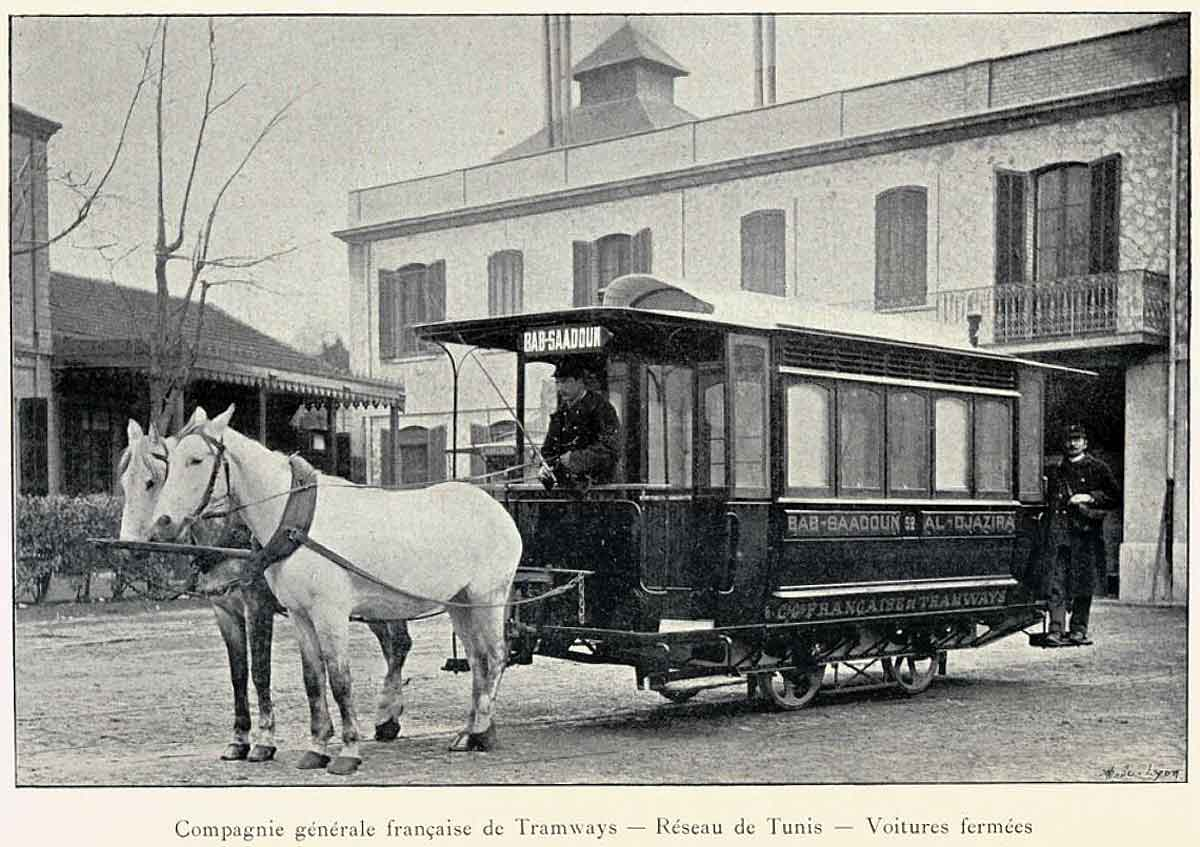
Tramcar running between Bab Saadoun and Al Djazira

The boycott began on 9 February 1912, after a tram driven by an Italian knocked down and killed an eight-year-old Tunisian Arab child at Bab Saadoun. Tunisian observers claimed that the driver was drunk and had struck the child deliberately. Protesters demanded that the operating company, the Compagnie des tramways de Tunis, should pay damages. Until it did so, protesters declared that they would boycott not only the trams, but all Italian-owned businesses. The protesters also demanded that all Italian workers should be dismissed from the company, and that Tunisian and French workers should earn equal pay.

The company rejected all the protesters' demands, and the boycott was pursued with great discipline. According to the newspapers, the company was losing a thousand francs a day as a result. This was the first time in North Africa that the indigenous inhabitants had attempted this kind of collective action, and the rigour with which it was pursued was very troubling to the French authorities.

== March ==
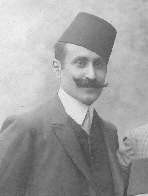
Ali Bach Hamba

The Young Tunisians did not instigate the boycott but defended it in their newspaper and became its effective spokesmen. This added a clear political dimension to the boycott that the authorities were not willing to tolerate, and they made clear that unless it was ended quickly, they would take repressive action. To this, Ali Bach Hamba, one of the leading Young Tunisians, responded 'I ask myself why one wishes to involve France in these questions, where its interests are not in any way at stake. For us France is inviolable but we will not accept that, if we have anything to take issue with, concerning either the acts of the Protectorate administration, or of a private enterprise delivering a public service, as is the case today, that we can be arrested on the basis that our efforts are a breach of the authority of France in this country.' Nevertheless, the authorities obtained a decree from the Bey which allowed them to move against the political leadership behind the boycott. On 13 March, before dawn, Bach Hamba, Hassan Guelati, Mohamed Nomane and Abdelaziz Thâalbi were summarily expelled from the country. Of the other leaders, Chedli Darghouth and Sadok Zmerli were exiled to Tataouine and Mokhtar Kahia was imprisoned.

The French authorities hoped that a hard line towards them would cow the remainder into abandoning the protest. In fact it had the opposite effect, as the expulsions, without any judicial procedure, merely highlighted the arbitrary nature of French authority in the Protectorate. However the mobilisation slowed thereafter and the boycott came to an end in March without any of the protesters' demands having been conceded.

== Consequences ==
The Tunis tramway boycott was formative in the development of the Tunisian national movement in two senses. First, The experience of collective action gave Tunisians greater political awareness and helped foster a readiness to work for larger social and political goals. Second, while the suppression of the Young Tunisians was effective in finishing them as a political force in Tunisia, the exiles who returned to Tunisia after the First World War played key roles in a new kind of political organisation, the Destour party, which would lead the movement that secured Tunisian independence.

== See also ==
- Italian Tunisians
- History of French-era Tunisia
