= La Dépêche tunisienne =

Tunisian newspaper

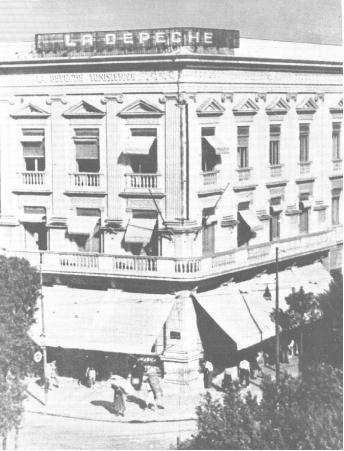
Headquarters of La Dépêche tunisienne at Tunis

La Dépêche tunisienne was a French language daily newspaper published in Tunisia.

== History and profile ==
La Dépêche tunisienne was established in 1892 when the country was under the French protectorate. It was the first newspaper which was published regularly in Tunisia.

Most literate French people in Tunisia at this time bought the paper. It also had a virtual monopoly on the daily French-language press in Tunisia via control of presses and titles such as Le Petit Matin. Politically in favour of the right, it was financed by major groups in mainland France and by local businesses. It had a circulation figure of 35,000 until 1939.

The paper ceased publication in 1961 due to financial problems.

== In Literature ==
The paper is frequently referenced in Robert Harris' historical novel An Officer and a Spy, a fictionalized biography of Georges Picquart. As depicted in the book, the Dépêche was the means by which Picquart, effectively exiled to Tunisia by the army command, could keep up with developments in the Dreyfus Affair. Relying on telegraph, the paper was able to publish up to date Paris news, while it took four days for physical copies of the Paris newspapers to reach Tunisia.
