= Muhammad al-Sanusi (Tunisian academic) =

Muhammad al-Sanusi Arabic: محمد السنوسي (also spelled Mohamed Snoussi), (1851-1900) was an academic, writer, judge, and poet associated with the Zaitouna mosque in Tunisia, Salafiyya philosophy, and the era of liberal reforms in Tunisia. He collaborated with contemporaries Mohammad Abduh, Khayr al-Din, and Sheikh Mahmud Qabadu.

Among his publications was 1897's Tafattuq al-Akmam ("The Ripping of the Calices"), which analyzed women's rights and living conditions in an Islamic historical and philosophical context.
