= Miles Tripp =

English writer (1923-2000)

Miles Barton Tripp (1923–2000) was an English writer of thirty-seven works of fiction including crime novels and thrillers, some of which he wrote under noms de plume Michael Brett and John Michael Brett. He served in RAF Bomber Command during World War II, flying thirty-seven sorties as a bomber-aimer, and completed 40 missions over enemy territory. He initially recorded his wartime experiences in a fictionalised memoir, Faith is a Windsock, before exploring them more deeply in the non-fiction title The Eighth Passenger. After the war, Tripp studied law and worked as a solicitor, and started to write fiction during his spare time. He lived in Hertfordshire, England.

Some of his novels, although they are about the themes of the law, crime, and retribution, are not in the classic crime fiction mould in that they are not whodunnits. For example, in Extreme Provocation the narrator is a man who says in the very first six words of the first chapter "After killing my wife I telephoned..." and the entire story is about how and why the character came to find himself in that situation, exactly what his state of mind was, how the law courts would treat him, and how his life thereafter would continue. It is thus not a conventional crime novel but is all about an event that may or may not be deemed a crime. The interest for the reader is in the gradual revelation of the narrator's state of mind and his motivations.

== Works ==
=== Non-fiction ===
- The Eighth Passenger: The Experiences of a Bomb Aimer in Lancaster Bombers During the 2nd World War (1969)

=== Fiction ===
(Titles marked § are in the series about Tripp's creation, the private detective John Samson)

- Faith Is a Windsock (1952)
- The Image of Man (1955)
- A Glass of Red Wine (1960)
- Kilo Forty (1963) (a.k.a. Death Is Catching)
- The Skin Dealer (1964)
- Diecast (1964) (writing as Michael Brett)
- A Quartet of Three (1965)
- A Plague of Dragons (1965) (writing as John Michael Brett)
- The Chicken (1966)
- A Cargo of Spent Evil (1966) (writing as John Michael Brett)
- Fifth Point of the Compass (1967)
- One Is One (1968)
- Malice and the Maternal Instinct (1969)
- Man Without Friends (1970)
- Five Minutes with a Stranger (1971)
- Claws of God (1972)
- Obsession (1973) §
- Woman at Risk (1974)
- Woman in Bed (1976) §
- Once a Year Man (1977) §
- Wife Smuggler (1978) §
- Cruel Victim (1979) §
- High Heels (1980) §
- Going Solo (1981)
- One Lover Too Many (1983) §
- A Charmed Death (1984)
- Some Predators Are Male (1985) §
- Death of Man Tamer (1987) §
- The Frightened Wife (1987) §
- The Cords of Vanity (1989) §
- Video Vengeance (1990) §
- The Dimensions of Deceit (1993)
- A Woman of Conscience (1994)
- Extreme Provocation (1995)
- Samson and the Greek Delilah (1995) §
- The Suitcase Killings (1997)
- Deadly Ordeal (1999) §
