= Khaldounia =

Educational institution in Tunisia

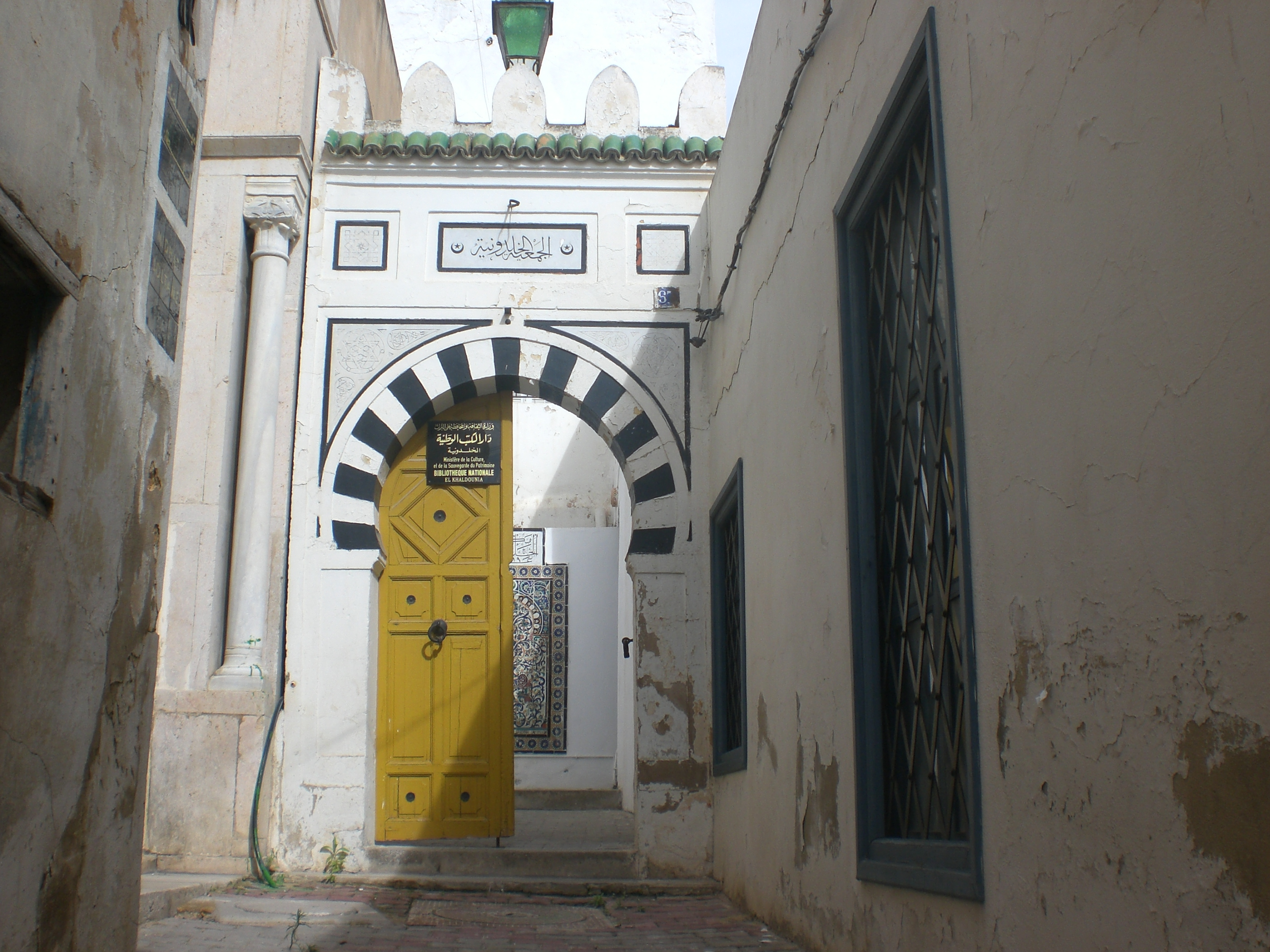
Entrance of the madrasa

Madrasa Al Khaldounia or simply Khaldounia (Arabic: الخلدونية) is the first modern school founded in Tunisia on December 22, 1896.

The madrasa is a good example of democracy, as all its members and presidents were elected. It was a free, public and laic institution. For years, it published regularly a review to facilitate Franco-Tunisian exchanges.

Nowadays, it is a bilingual library attached to the National Library of Tunisia.

== History ==
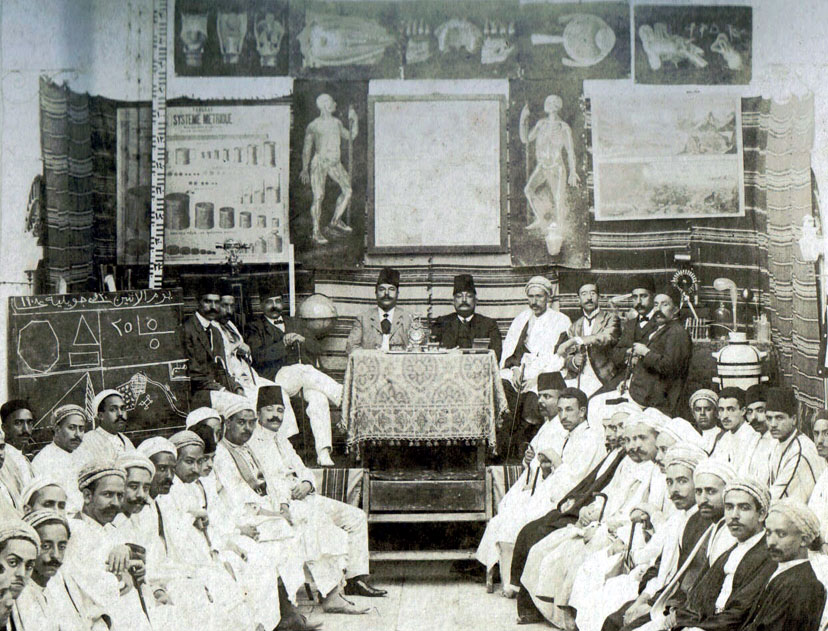
Khaldounia class in 1908

Khaldounia was established by Young Tunisians led by Bechir Sfar, who aimed to spread the scientific knowledge in the Arabic culture. He had the support of René Millet, the French resident-general in Tunisia who was in charge of writing the madrasa's status that excluded political and religious discussions and emphasized on the importance of critical thinking.

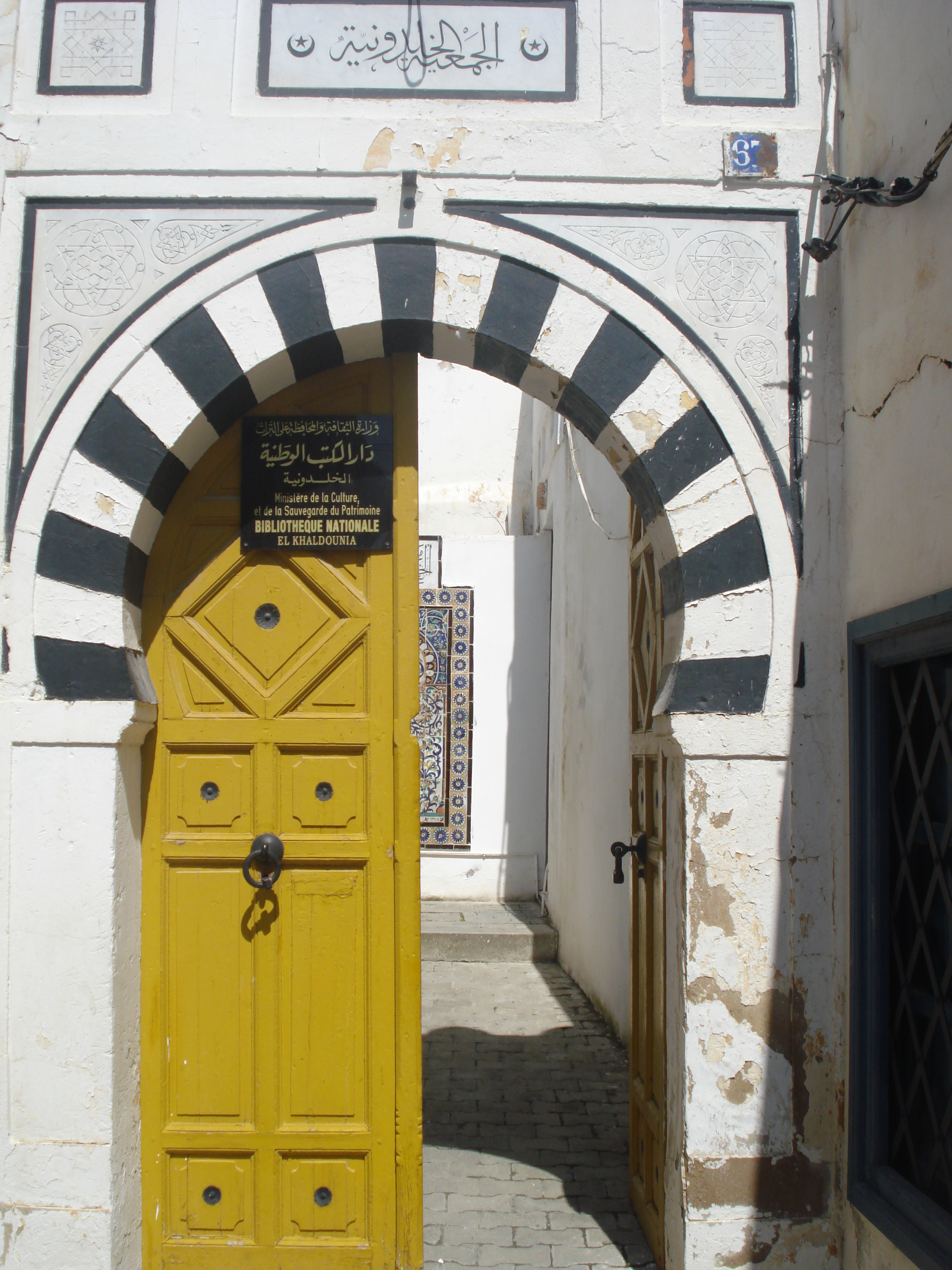
Entrance of the Khaldounia association

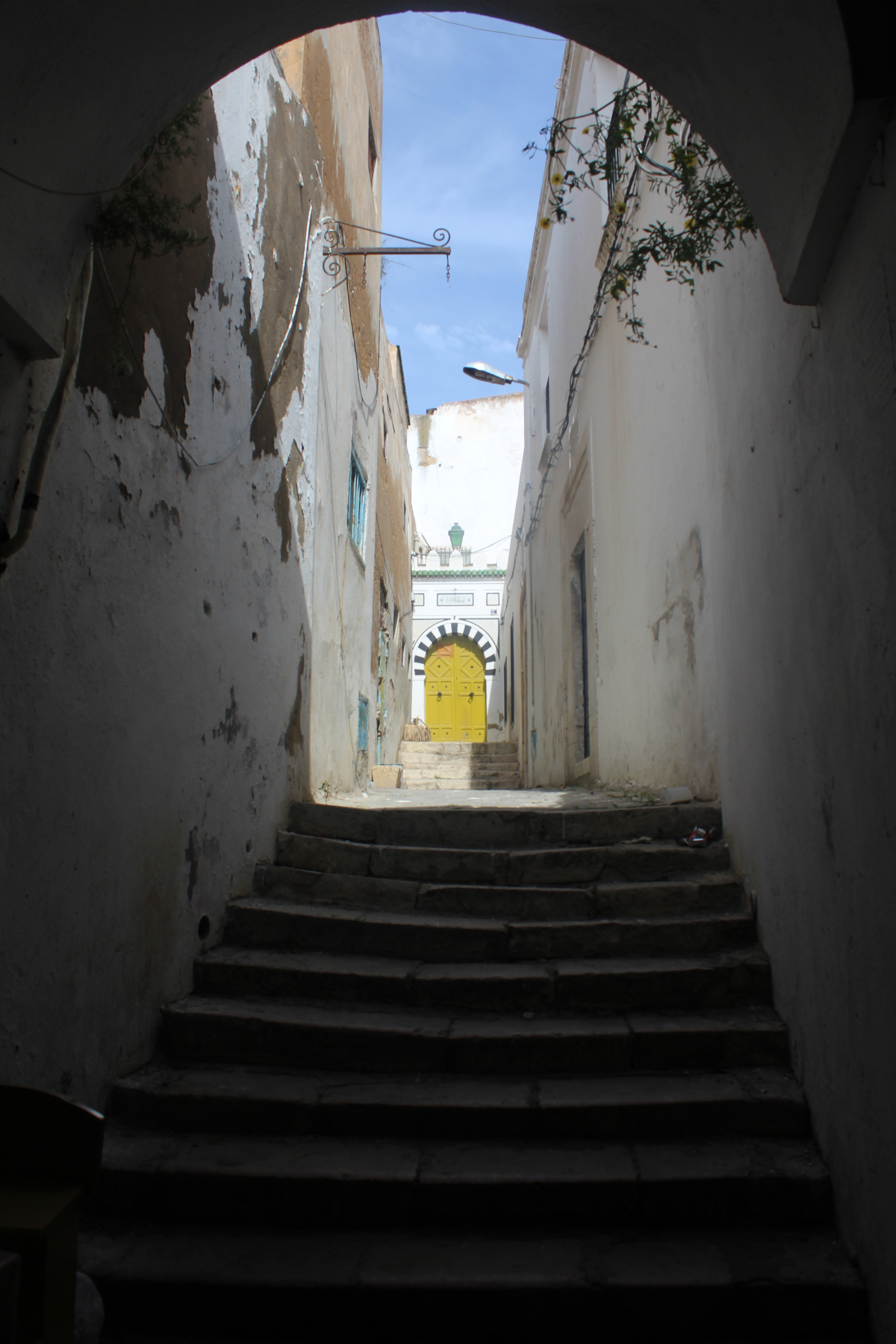
Dead end of the madrasa

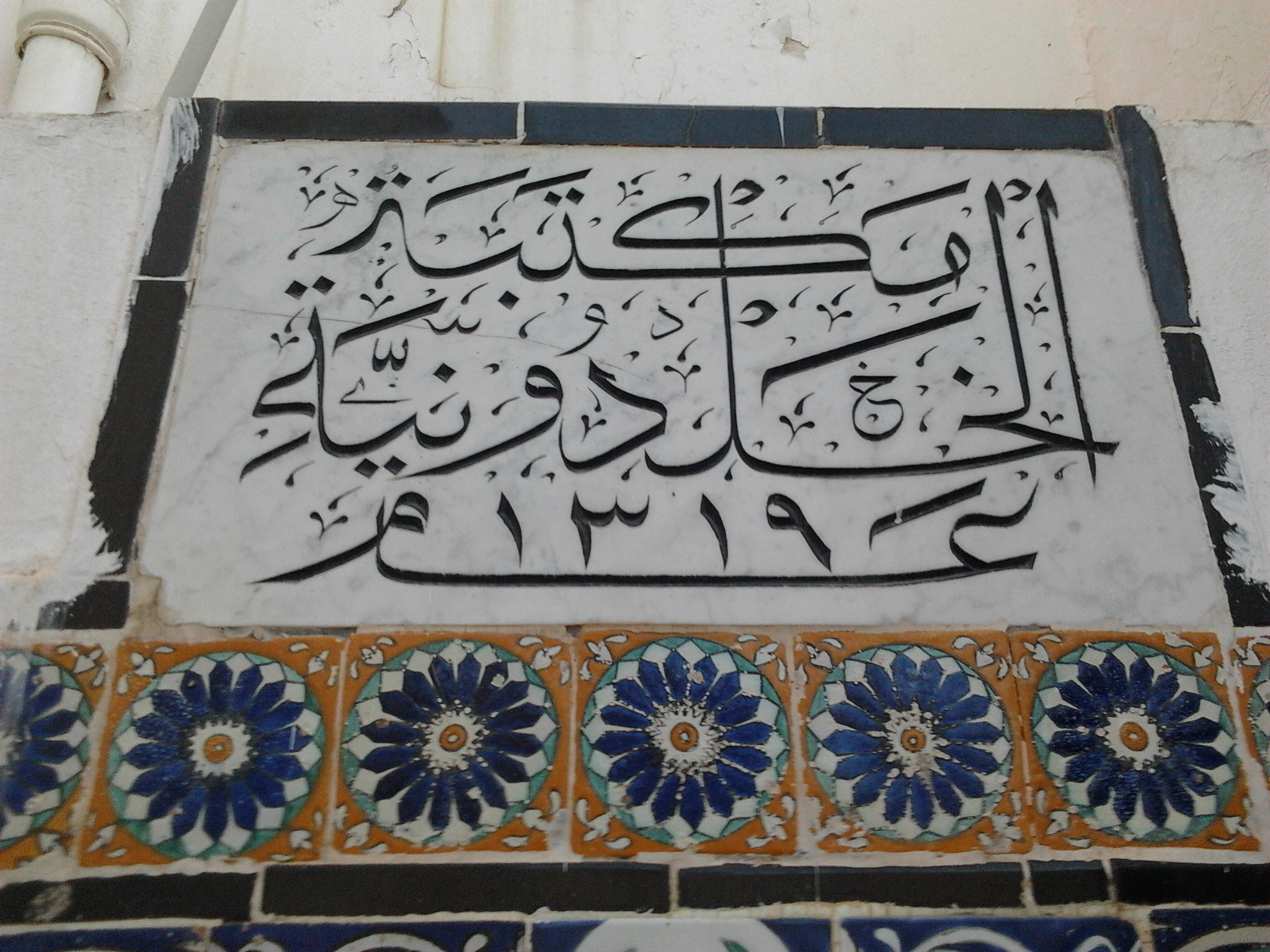
Marble plaque at the entrance of the Khaldounia Library

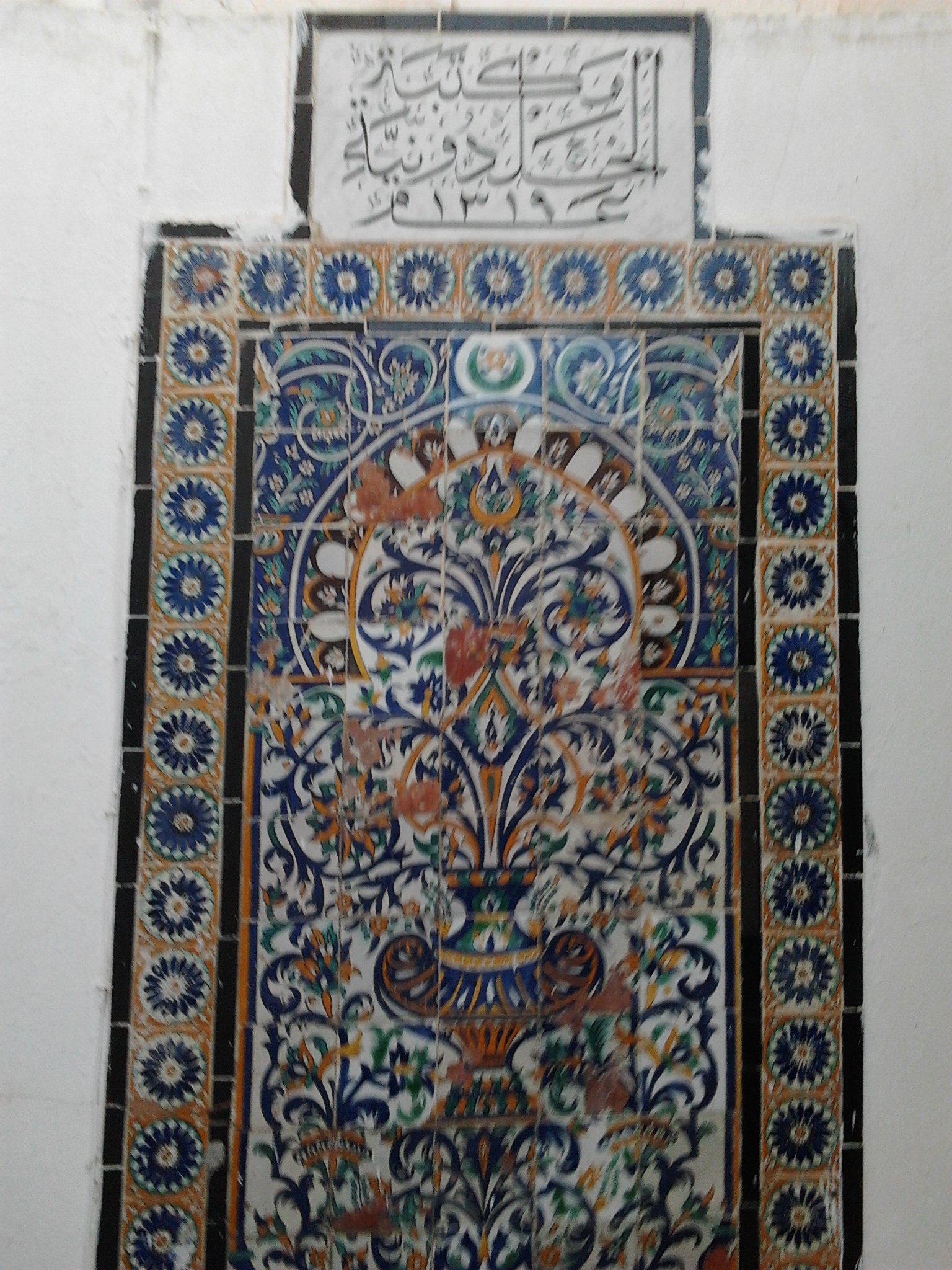
Decoration at the entrance
