= Abdelaziz Thâalbi =

Tunisian politician

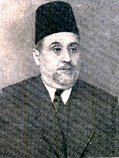
- Born: September 5, 1876; Tunis
- Died: October 1, 1944 (aged 68); Tunis
- Other names: ʿAbd al-ʿAzīz al-Thaʿalibī

Abdelaziz Thâalbi (عبد العزيز الثعالبي, September 5, 1876 – October 1, 1944) was a Tunisian politician. He was one of the founding members of the Destour party.

== Early life ==
Abdelaziz Thâalbi's father was a notary whose family moved from Algeria to Tunis after the 1830 French occupation of Algeria. Thâalbi studied at the University of Ez-Zitouna, where he became learned in Salafiyyah. After he graduated in 1895, Thâalbi began publishing a religious journal, Sabil al-Rashid ("the proper path"). In 1897, journal was suspended by the French, and Thâalbi left Tunisia, travelling in Libya, Egypt, and India. He spent at least two years in Egypt, allegedly moving with disciples of Jamal-al-Din al-Afghani and Muhammad Abduh.

Returning to Tunis in 1901, he began to openly criticize maraboutism and advocate a rationalistic reading of the Quran. In 1904 he was taken to court, accused of cursing Abdul-Qadir Gilani and calling the Quran an "obsolete book out of step with the progress of our age". He was largely defended by the French newspapers and condemned by the Arabic ones, and was ultimately found guilty and sentenced to two months in prison.

In 1905 Thâalbi published L'esprit libéral du Coran ("the liberal spirit of the Quran") with César Benattar (who had been his defense lawyer) and el-Hadi Sebai. It was pro-French, in contrast with Sabil al-Rashid and his later writings. It claimed that

through a literal, rational, scientific, liberal, and faithful interpretation of the Quran and hadiths the Muslim people will recover their past intellectual greatness, and with the civilizing influence of the French, the descendants of those that proclaimed the principles of the French Revolution, Muslims minds, freed at last of all superstitions and prejudices, will be able to one day contribute, in collaboration with their Protectors, to the global civilization.

Thâalbi made connections with the Young Tunisians, and became editor of their Arabic newspaper. He participated in their political activities until he was expelled from Tunisia in 1912 following the Tunis Tram Boycott.

== Destour ==
After World War I, Thâalbi returned to Tunisia and joined former Young Tunisians who requested a decrease of French control at the Paris Peace Conference. In 1920 he wrote La Tunisie martyre ("the martyr Tunisia"), a nationalist manifesto wherein he criticized the protectorate and advocated the restoration of the 1861 constitution, an elected assembly and independent judiciary, improved education, and better protection of civil rights. He was arrested and returned to Tunisia. In 1921 he led the foundation of the Destour political party based on the policies outlined in La Tunisie martyre.

In 1922, France proposed minor reforms in response to Destour pressure, but Thâalbi and the Destour rejected them. After the death of the ruler Muhammad V an-Nasir and the growing intolerance of the French authorities, Thâalbi left the country.

== Later years ==
After spending time in exile in Egypt, Iraq, and India, Thâalbi returned to Tunisia in 1937. By then the Destour had fallen into minority and had been eclipsed by the Neo Destour, who rejected Thâalbi's traditional values. He attempted to revive Destour with little success, and died in 1944.
