= Young Tunisians =

Political party and movement in Tunisia under French rule

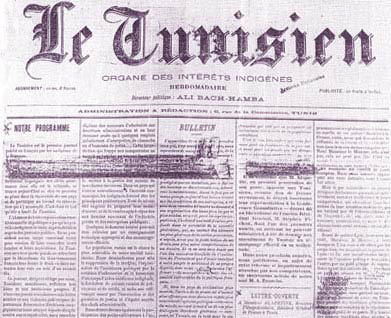
Le tunisien Cover - First edition

The Young Tunisians (Arabic: حركة الشباب التونسى Ḥarakat ash-shabāb at-Tūnisi; French: Jeunes Tunisiens) was a Tunisian political party and political reform movement in the early 20th century. Its main goal was to advocate for reforms in the French protectorate in order to give more political autonomy and equal treatment to Tunisians.

== History and profile ==
In 1883, Tunisia was declared a French protectorate. A group of young Tunisian intellectuals started an anti-colonial movement that was challenging the Sufi orders. Their ideas influenced the modern reforms in the country.

The party, known as the Jeunes Tunisiens (Young Tunisians), was formed in 1907 who thought that the people of Tunisia should have self-determination, rather than being a protectorate of France. The movement was inspired by the Young Turks of the Ottoman Empire and the Egyptian National Party led by Mustafa Kamil Pasha. They were French-educated and advocated for the rights of Tunisians and Frenchmen. In 1908 the party supported the establishment of a constitution for Tunisia.

They printed a newspaper called Le Tunisien. This was the first French-language Arab newspaper in Tunisia. Their motto was "Organe hebdomadaire des intérêts indigènes" ("the weekly voice of the natives"). The newspaper combined modernist and reformist ideas with traditional Tunisian values.

In 1912, the Young Tunisians attempted to negotiate with the French about the reforms. Tensions started to rise between the Young Tunisians and the French authorities when the negotiations did not progress. Two events were particularly noteworthy. The first event were protests held in 1911 against the French authorities who had confiscated the Zallaj land. The second event happened in 1912 when a Tunisian boy was killed due to an Italian driver who ran over the tramway. As a result, the Tunisians decided to boycott the tramway service. There was resentment against the French colonialism. Due to the protests and clashes, France decided to sharpen its colonial policy by censoring the press and limited the Young Tunisians in 1912. Le Tunisien was shut down and a few of the Young Tunisian leaders were expelled.

Although the party gained considerable support from educated and professional Tunisians, they were considered to be too close to the French by the majority of Tunisians. After violence broke out in Tunisia as a result of the Italian invasion of Tripolitania and French moves to make the Jellaz cemetery public property, the French administration clamped down on the group. Its leaders were sent into exile after the Tunis Tram Boycott and the group was forced underground.

== Ideology ==
The Young Tunisians focused mainly on domestic issues such as education and economy. They aimed to address the French government and the French population to advocate for reforms in the country. Not to seek a complete and total independency, but to obtain a greater autonomy. For that reason, Le Tunisien was written in French . Their main goal was to offer a public and free education to all Tunisians. In the first issue of Le Tunisien, the Young Tunisians wrote:

"Une réforme complète de l'Enseignement s'impose. Il appartient à la France, dans un élan digne de ses traditions et de son idéal démocratique, de décréter l'instruction primaire gratuite et obligatoire dans toute la Régence. En outre, le gouvernement du Protectorat devra faciliter aux indigènes l'accès de l'enseignement secondaire et encourager l'élite à aborder l'enseignement supérieur." ("A complete reform of education is essential. It is up to France, in an effort worthy of its traditions and its democratic ideal, to decree free and compulsory primary education throughout the Regency. In addition, the government of the Protectorate should facilitate access to secondary education for the natives and encourage the elite to approach higher education.")

This goal was opposed by some colonizers who wanted to prevent any idea of freedom, independence and equality between the colonizers and colonized.

In 1910, for the 4th year of publication of Le Tunisien, Ali Bach Hamba wrote "tout musulman est par définition panislamiste" ("all muslims are panislamist by definition"). The quote refers to the strong links of friendship and brotherhood between the Muslim world. Ali Bach Hamba underlines after that these links are only spirituals and should not be used to unify Tunisia with the Ottoman Empire for example.

== Influence and legacy ==
The Young Tunisians's demands found their audience in the French deputies (a.k.a. Members of Parliament in English) and senators. Some of them recognized the importance of the instruction of the Tunisian youth like Auguste Bouge, who recognized and proclaimed "equality of French and natives regarding instruction" and wrote in his report on the Tunisian budget in 1910:

"Ce n'est que par l'école que nous parviendrons à former chez les jeunes générations une âme nouvelle et moderne, susceptible de s'affranchir des préjugés de race et de se garder de toute intransigeance religieuse." ("It is only through school that we will succeed in forming among the younger generations a new and modern soul, capable of freeing itself from racial prejudices and guarding against all religious intransigence.")

After the consequences of the 1912 Tunis Tram Boycott, the party lost its founders and some of its leaders who had been exiled or imprisoned. A few years later they had been pardoned but with the First World War going on they decided to wait before starting to demand reforms and change in the Tunisian society.

After the end of the war, the Young Tunisian start to meet again with new members and decide that they want to push their demands again. Abdelaziz Thâalbi wrote with the help of several intellectuals from the Young Tunisians La Tunisie Martyre, a book that fulfills this wish. The book was distributed to the French political world and had a considerable effect on the left wing of the French political landscape.

Important figures of the Young Tunisians such as Thâalbi and Zmerli were among the founders of the Destour, the Constitutional Liberal Party, a nationalist party that wanted to free Tunisia from the French Protectorate in 1920. This was the party of Habib Bourguiba before the scission in 1934 and the creation of the Neo-Destour.

== Prominent figures ==
- Ali Bach Hamba (1878-1918), co-founder of the Young Tunisians; founder of the newspaper Le Tunisien (1907).
- Mohamed Bach Hamba (1881-1920) co-founder of the Young Tunisians and editor of the "Revue du Maghreb"
- Bechir Sfar (1856-1917), co-founder of the Young Tunisians, independency activist.
- Hassen Guellaty (1880-1966), lawyer at the Tunis bar, editor of Le Tunisien
- Abdelaziz Thâalbi (1876-1944), militant inside the Young Tunisian; founder and editor of the Arabic version of Le Tunisien (1909), author of La Tunisie martyre (The martyred Tunisia) (1920); co-founder of the Constitutional Liberal Party a.k.a. the Destour in 1920.
- Sadok Zmerli (1893-1983), journalist for Le Tunisien (French and Arabic versions), co-founder of the Constitutional Liberal Party a.k.a. the Destour in 1920.
