= Le Tunisien =

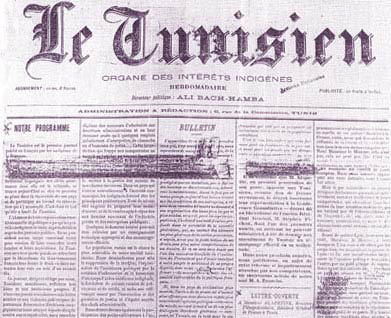
First edition of Le Tunisien (Cover page).

Le Tunisien was a weekly French-language newspaper in Tunisia founded in 1907. It was associated with the Parti évolutionniste and, more generally, the Tunisian nationalist movement. It was the first indigenous newspaper to be published in Tunisia in French. An Arabic edition, al-Tounsi, was first published in 1909.

== See also ==
- Al Hadira
- al-Tounsi
