= Destour =

1920–1963 political party in Tunisia

Constitutional Liberal Party الحزب الحر الدستوري
- Abbreviation: Destour
- Former president: Abdelaziz Thâalbi (1921–1944)
- Founded: 6 June 1920
- Dissolved: 1963
- Preceded by: Young Tunisians
- Newspaper: Al Irada (1920-1956); Al Istiklal (1956-1960)
- Ideology: Tunisian nationalism Arab nationalism

The Constitutional Liberal Party (Arabic: الحزب الحر الدستوري, el-Ḥizb el-Ḥurr ed-Dustūrī), most commonly known as Destour, was a Tunisian political party, founded in 1920, which had as its goal to liberate Tunisia from French colonial control.

== History ==
The Destour (Arabic: الحزب الحر الدستوري, al-Ḥizb al-Ḥurr ad-Dustūrī, meaning "Constitutional Liberal Party") was a Tunisian nationalist political party founded in Tunis on 6 June 1920. Emerging from the earlier reformist movement of the Young Tunisians, it became the first organized vehicle for constitutional and nationalist demands under the French protectorate. The party’s platform called for the restoration of Tunisia’s 1861 constitution, greater political representation, and protection of Tunisian identity.

=== Origins (1907–1920) ===
The party’s roots lay in the Young Tunisians (1907–1920), a group of reformist intellectuals calling for modernization, equality before the law, and restoration of Tunisia’s 1861 constitution.

=== Foundation and early years (1920–1930) ===
Destour was officially founded on 6 June 1920 in Tunis by Abdelaziz Thâalbi and other nationalists after the publication of La Tunisie martyre, Thâalbi’s manifesto condemning abuses under the French protectorate and calling for constitutional reform. The party sought constitutional guarantees, representative government, and protection of Tunisian identity

The party wanted to remove all French influence from Tunisia and return to an earlier time. The students, faculty, and alumni of the University of Ez-Zitouna became an integral part of the 1920s Destour party. As time passed, graduates from Sadiki College took high level positions in the party, while Zitouna graduates formed its lower and middle cadres.

=== Split and Neo-Destour (1930–1934) ===
By the early 1930s, generational tensions within Destour led to the creation of the Neo Destour in 1934, following the Ksar Hellal Congress. Younger activists such as Habib Bourguiba and Mahmoud El Materi broke away, arguing for direct mass mobilisation rather than petitions.

After Tunisia's independence Destour progressively fell into irrelevance and was eclipsed by Neo-Destour. It continued to publish its newspaper Al Istiklal until 1960 and was eventually disbanded in 1963, when Neo-Destour was declared the only legal party in Tunisia.

== Leaders ==
- Abdelaziz Thâalbi (1920-1923)
- Ahmed Essafi (1923-1935)
- Salah Farhat (1935-1963)

== Founding members ==
- Ahmed Taoufik El Madani
- Ahmed Essafi
- Salah Farhat
- Ali Kahia
- Mohieddine Klibi
- Hamouda Mestiri
- Ahmed Sakka
- Abdelaziz Thâalbi
- Habib Zouiten
- Hassen Guellaty

== See also ==
- Neo Destour
- Parti Socialiste Destourian (PSD)
- Rassemblement Constitutionel Démocratique (RCD)
