= Sadiki College =

School in Tunis, Tunisia

Coordinates: 36°47′54″N 10°09′59″E

- المدرسة الصادقية "Al-Madrasa al-Sadiqiya"
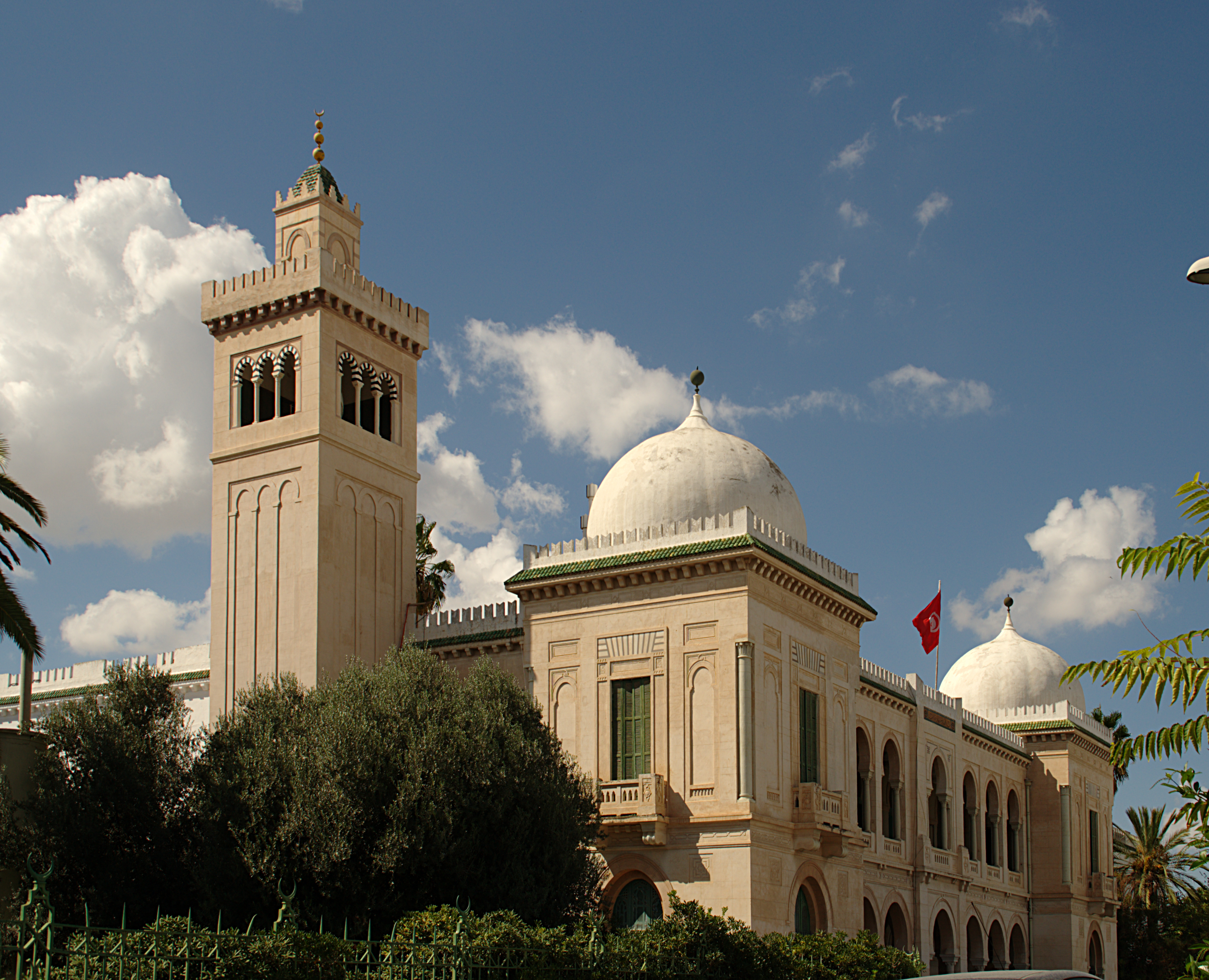
- Medina of Tunis, Tunis; Tunisia

Information
- Type: Public School
- Established: February 1, 1875; 151 years ago
- Founder: Muhammad III as-Sadiq Hayreddin Pasha

Sadiki College, also known as Collège Sadiki (Tunisian Arabic: المدرسة الصادقية, "El-Sadiqiya High School"), is a lycée (high school) in Tunis, Tunisia. It was established in 1875. Associations formed by its alumni played a major role in the early constitutionalist movement in the country.

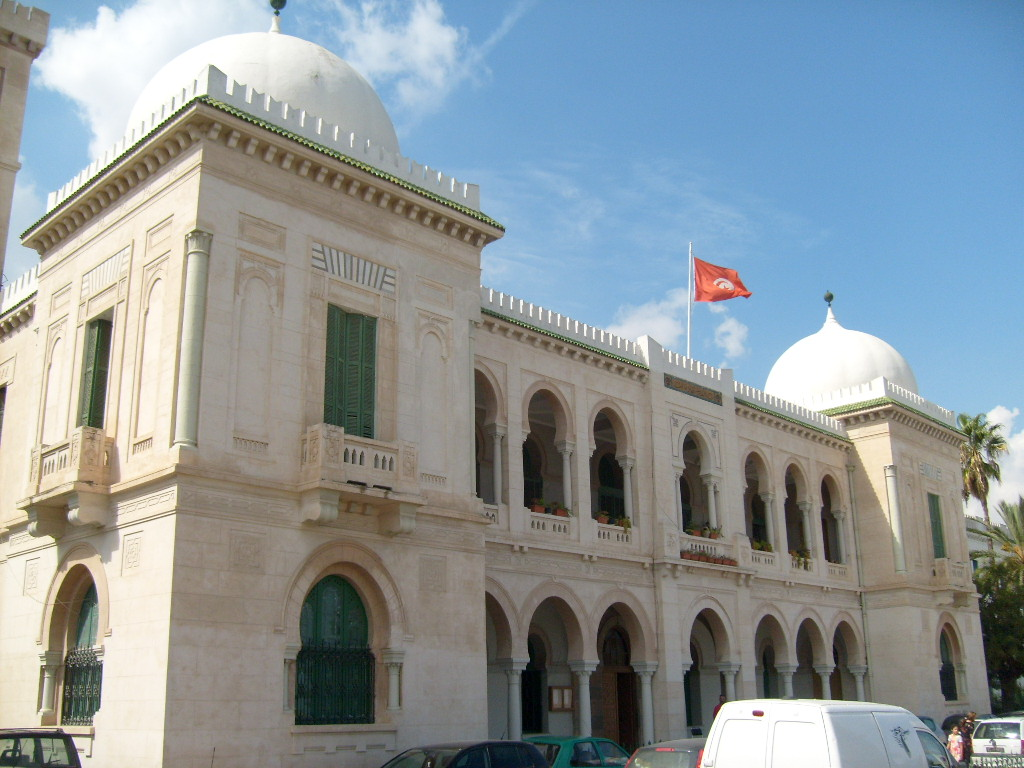
Sadiki College

Noted alumni include former president Habib Bourguiba, politicians Mohamed Mzali, Mustapha Ben Jafar and Azzedine Guellouz. Another alumnus was the creative writer Mahmoud Messadi.

Sadiki historically has provided a bicultural, bilingual education. Many of the Tunisian elites, including Bourguiba, graduated from this school. These elites filled the positions of top responsibility of the Destour party. Charles A. Micaud of The Western Political Quarterly said "[i]ts realistic strategy of struggle against colonialism became convincing even to Zitūna students, many of whom came to form the medium and lower cadres of the party." The graduates of Sadiki placed a bilingual education system in Tunisia after its independence.

== History ==
Khayr al-Diyn Pacha al-Tunisi, a reformer, had founded the school in 1875. On 25 June 1958 President Bourguiba delivered a speech at the school, declaring that in secondary schools, all subjects will eventually be taught in Arabic instead of French throughout Tunisia.

== See also ==
- Category:Alumni of Sadiki College
