= Al-Afghani =

al-Afghani (Arabic: الأفغاني) is a nisba meaning "Afghan" or from Afghanistan. It may refer to:

- Jamal al-Din al-Afghani, 19th-century political activist
- Abul Wafa Al-Afghani, Islamic scholar
- Sa'id al-Afghani, 20th-century scholar
- Dr. Muhammad Muhsin Khan Al-Afghani, Medical doctor, author, translator, and Islamic scholar
- Haroon al-Afghani, Afghan-Pakistani citizen detained by the United States
- Muhammad Rahim al-Afghani, Afghan citizen detained by the United States
- Mohammed al-Afghani, Afghan citizen detained by the United States
- Abu Dujana Al-Afghani
