= Mohammed Al Afghani =

Muhammad Al Afghani may refer to:

- Mohammed Al Afghani (captive of the CIA), captured in 2004, held by the CIA, location unknown
- Muhammad Rahim al Afghani (born 1965), captured in Lahore in 2008, transferred to Guantanamo
