= History of Tunisia under French rule =

The history of Tunisia under French rule began in 1881 with the establishment of the French protectorate and ended in 1956 with Tunisian independence. The French presence in Tunisia came five decades after their conquest and occupation of neighboring Algeria. Both of these lands had been associated with the Ottoman Empire for three centuries, yet each had long since attained political autonomy. Before the French arrived, the Bey of Tunisia had begun a process of modern reforms, but financial difficulties mounted, resulting in debt. A commission of European creditors then took over the finances. After the French conquest of Tunisia the French government assumed Tunisia's international obligations. Major developments and improvements were undertaken by the French in several areas, including transport and infrastructure, industry, the financial system, public health, administration, and education. Although these developments were welcome, nonetheless French businesses and citizens were clearly being favored over Tunisians. Their ancient national sense was early expressed in speech and in print; and then political organization occurred. The independence movement was already active before World War I, and continued to gain strength against mixed French opposition. Its ultimate aim was achieved in 1956.

== Beylical reform, debt ==
Flag of the Bey of Tunis

As the 19th century began, the Husaynid dynasty Bey remained hereditary rulers of the country. Since the early 18th century Tunisia had effectively been autonomous, although still 'officially' an Ottoman province. Commerce and trade with Europe increased dramatically following the Napoleonic Wars. Western merchants especially Italians arrived to establish businesses in the major cities. Italian farmers, tradesmen, and laborers also immigrated to Tunisia. Foreign influence grew with the rapid surge in contacts with Europe.

During the rule of Ahmad Bey (r.1837-1855) extensive modern reforms were initiated. Later, in 1861 Tunisia promulgated the first constitution in the Arab world. Yet the Tunisian drive toward modernizing the state and the economy met resistance. Reformers became frustrated by comfort-seeking insiders, political disorganization, regional discontent, and rural poverty. An 1864 revolt in the Sahil region was brutally put down. Later, after ineffective measures had failed, the leading reformer Khair al-Din (Khaïreddine) became chief minister 1873–1877, but he too eventually met defeat by wily conservative politicians.

European banks advanced funds to the Beylical government for modernizing projects, such as civil improvements, the military, public works, and development projects, but also they included money for the personal use of the Bey. The loans were frequently negotiated at unfavorable rates and terms. Repayment of the foreign debt eventually grew increasingly difficult to manage. In 1869, Tunisia declared itself bankrupt. A Commission Financière Internationale (International Financial Commission) was thereafter formed, whose representatives were led by France; Italy and Britain were also representatives. The commission took control over the Tunisian economy.

== French regime ==
=== Establishment ===
Initially, Italy was the European country most interested in incorporating Tunisia into its sphere of influence. Italy's strong motivation derived from the substantial number of expatriate citizens already resident there, with corresponding business investment, due to its close geography. Yet in the emerging national conscience of the newly unified (1861) Italian state, the establishment of a directly ruled colony did not then attract high-priority interest for the political agenda.

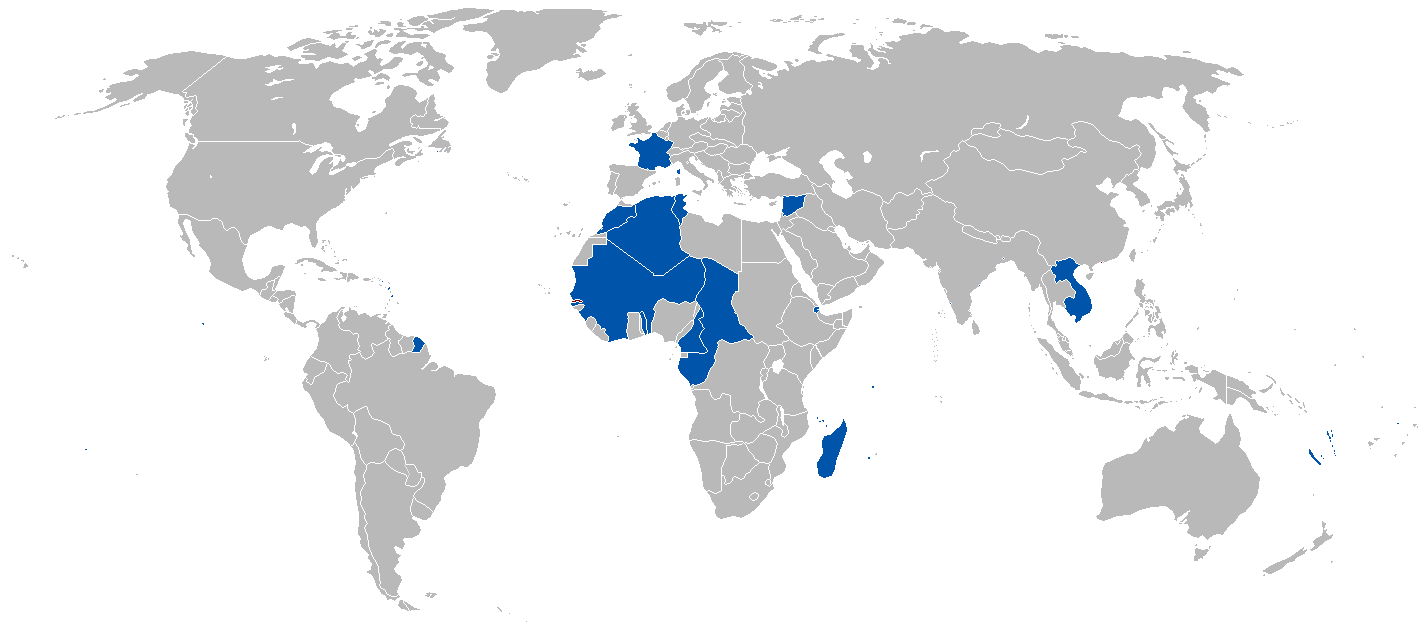
French possessions, 1920s, with the then protectorate in Tunisia

France, whose possession of Algeria bordered Tunisia, and Britain, then possessing the tiny island of Malta lying off its coast, were also interested. Britain wanted to avoid a single power controlling both sides of the Strait of Sicily. During 1871–1878, France and Britain had been co-operating to foreclose Italian political influence. Yet more often these two countries were keen rivals. "For most of their tenure [both began in 1855], Richard Wood and Léon Roches, the consuls respectively of Britain and France, competed fiercely with each other to gain an economic or political edge in Tunisia."

The Congress of Berlin, held in 1878, convened to discuss the Ottoman Empire, the "sick man" of Europe, following its decisive defeat by Russia, with a focus on its remaining Balkan possessions. At the Congress, an informal understanding among the British, Germans, and French was reached, assenting to France incorporating Tunisia, although the negotiations around this understanding were kept secret from the Italians at the time. The French Foreign Minister, William Waddington, discussed the matter extensively with Britain's Lord Salisbury, and Otto von Bismarck, while originally opposed, came to view Tunisia as an ideal distraction of the French away from continental Europe by the time of the Congress. Italy was promised Tarabulus in what became Libya. Britain supported French influence in Tunisia in exchange for its own protectorate over Cyprus (recently 'purchased' from the Ottomans), and French cooperation regarding a nationalist revolt in Egypt. In the meantime, however, an Italian company apparently bought the Tunis-Goletta-Marsa rail line; yet French strategy worked to circumvent this and other issues created by the sizeable colony of Tunisian Italians. Direct attempts by the French to negotiate their entry into Tunisia with the Bey failed. France waited, searching to find reasons to justify the timing of a pre-emptive strike, now actively contemplated. Italians called the strike the Schiaffo di Tunisi.

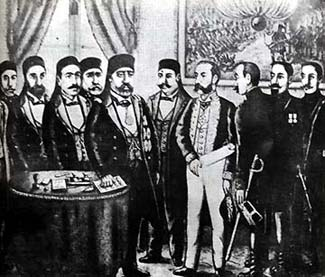
Signing the Treaty of Bardo 1881

In northwest Tunisia the Khroumir tribe episodically launched raids into the surrounding countryside. In Spring of 1881 they raided across the border into French Algeria. France responded by invading Tunisia, sending in an army of about 36,000. Their advance to Tunis was rapidly executed. The Bey was soon compelled to come to terms with the French conquest of the country, in the first of a series of treaties. The documents provided that the Bey continue as head of state, but with the French given effective control over a great deal of Tunisian governance, in the form of the Protectorat français en Tunisie.

With her own substantial interests in Tunisia, Italy protested but would not risk a confrontation with France. Hence Tunisia officially became a French protectorate on May 12, 1881, when the ruling Sadik Bey (1859–1882) signed at his palace the Treaty of Bardo (Al Qasr as Sa'id). Later in 1883 his younger brother and successor 'Ali Bey signed the Conventions of La Marsa. Resistance by autonomous local forces in the south, encouraged by the Ottomans in Tarabulus, continued for half a year longer, with instability remaining for several years.

Paul Cambon, the first Resident-Minister (after 1885 called the Resident-General) of the French Protectorate, arrived in early 1882. According to agreement he assumed the office of the Bey's foreign minister, while the general commanding French troops became the minister of war. Soon another Frenchman became director-general of finance. Sadiq Bey died within a few months. Cambon wanted to demonstrate the complete disestablishment of Ottoman claims to suzerainty in Tunisia. The Ottomans beforehand agreed to acquiesce. Accordingly, Cambon designed and orchestrated the accession ceremony of 'Ali Bey (1882–1902). Cambon personally accompanying him from his La Marsa residence to the Bardo Palace where Cambon invested him as the new Bey in the name of France.

The French progressively assumed more of the important administrative positions. By 1884 they directed or supervised the Tunisian administration of government bureaus dealing with finance, post, education, telegraph, public works and agriculture. After deciding to guarantee the Tunisian state debt (chiefly to European investors), the Protectorate then abolished the international finance commission. French settlements in the country were being actively encouraged; the number of French colonists grew from 10,000 in 1891 to 46,000 in 1911, and then to a total of 144,000 in 1945.

=== Economic advance ===
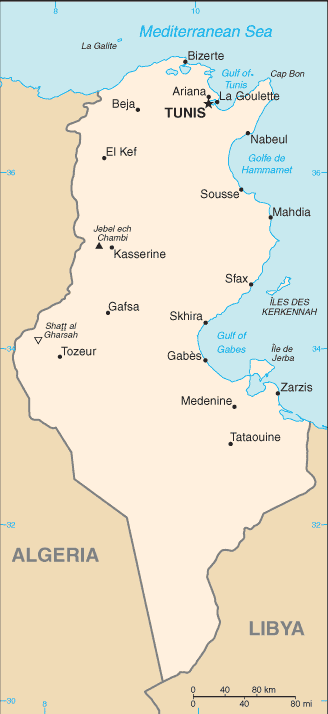
Modern Tunisia

The transportation system was developed by the construction of railroads and highways, as well as sea ports. Already by 1884 the Compagnie du Bône-Guelma had built a rail line running from Tunis west 1,600 km to Algiers, passing through the fertile Medjerda river valley near Beja and over the high tell. Eventually rail lines were built all along the coast from the northwest at Tabarka to Bizerte, to Tunis and Sousse, to Sfax and Gabès; inland routes went from the coastal ports to Gafsa, to Kasserine, and to El Kef. Highways were also constructed. Geologists from French mining companies scrutinized the land for hidden resources, and invested in various projects. Railroads and ports often became ancillary developments to mining operations. Among the deposits discovered and extracted for export, phosphates (a salt of phosphoric acid, used chiefly as fertilizer) became the most important, mined near the south-central city of Gafsa. One company was awarded the concession to develop the mines and build the railroad, another to construct the port facilities at Sfax. The Compagnie des Phosphates et Chemins de Fer de Gafsa became the largest employer and taxpayer in the Protectorate. Iron and other minerals including zinc, lead, and copper, were also first profitably mined during the French era.

Tunisian nationalists complained that these improvements, e.g., the rail and mining operations, were intended primarily to benefit France. The French profited most, and the employment opportunities were open more to French colonists than to Tunisians. French companies provided their own engineers, technicians, managers, and accountants, and most of the skilled work force. Another major grievance of nationalist critics regarded the 'flood' of cheap manufactured goods entering the Tunisian market. This competition wreaked havoc with the large artisan class, until then in good health and vigor, who made comparable goods by hand according to tradition. Here, the French did no more than passively introduce into Tunisia the fruits of advanced production techniques, and then let neutral market forces wreck their destruction on the local merchants, who could not compete on price.

Under the Protectorate, the social infrastructure was also improved, e.g., by school construction (see below, Education reform), and the erection of public buildings for meetings and performances. Civic improvements included the provision of new sources of clean water and the construction of public sanitation facilities in Tunis, and other large cities. Hospitals were built, the number of medical doctors increased, vaccinations became common, hence fatalities due to epidemics and other ills decreased; the per annum death-rate dropped dramatically. As a result, the Tunisian population steadily increased, the number of Muslims about doubling between 1881 and 1946.

Regarding agriculture, French settlers and companies acquired farm lands in such quantities as to cause resentment among Tunisians. Habis rural properties (land held in religious trust or wafq), and also tribal lands held in common, were made available for monetary purchase due to fundamental changes in the land law legislated by the Protectorate. The social utility of farm lands, in extent and intensity, advanced, especially regarding production of olive groves and of vineyards.

In rural areas the French administration strengthened the local officials (qa'ids) and weakened the independent tribes. Nationwide an additional judicial system was established for Europeans but available generally, set-up without interfering with the existing Sharia courts, available as always for the legal matters of Tunisians.

=== Education reform ===
The French presence, despite its negatives, did present Tunisians with opportunities to become better acquainted with recent European advances. Modernizing projects had already been an articulated goal of the reform movements initiated under the Beys prior to the French. Among the areas of study that were sought for their practical value were agriculture, mining, urban sanitation, business and commerce, banking and finance, state administration, manufacture and technology, and education.

Prior to the Protectorate the schools open to the majority of Tunisians were religious, e.g., the many local kuttab whose curriculum centered on the memorization and study of the Qur'an. These schools were usually proximous to the mosque and run by the imam. Students might progress to further such instruction at advanced schools. Especially noteworthy in this regard, but at the highest level, was the leading theological facility at the Mosque of Uqba in Kairouan, founded circa 670. During the 9th-11th centuries, in addition to religious subjects, medicine, botany, astronomy, and math were taught. Above all the Uqba Mosque then was the center of the Maliki school of law. Muslim scholars, the ulama from throughout northern Africa, came here to study.

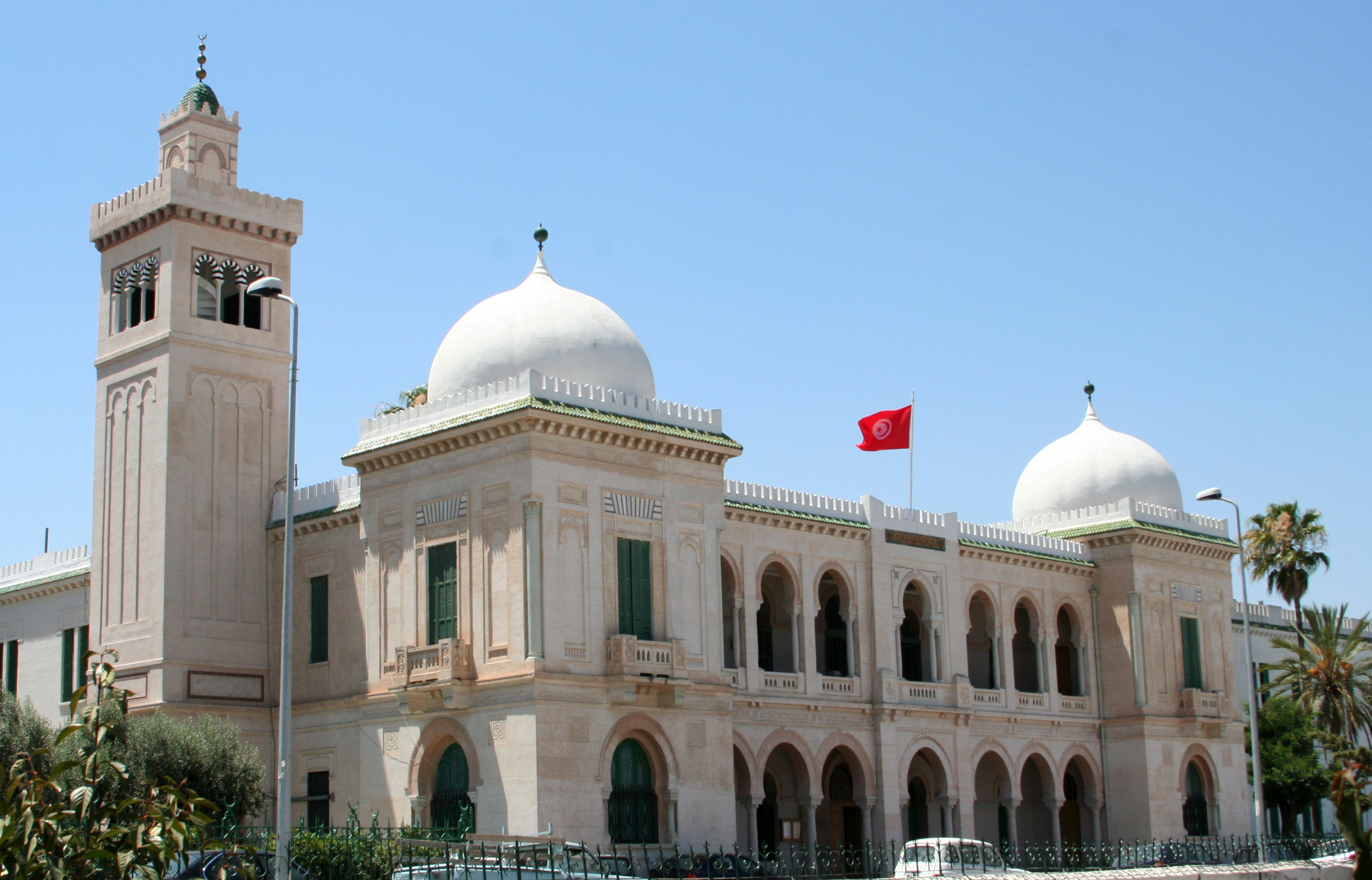
Collège Sadiki in Tunis, founded in 1875 under the Bey Muhammad III as-Sadiq

Yet educational modernizing had preceded the French to a limited extent. The Zitouna Mosque school in Tunis, which accepted the best graduates of the kuttab primary schools, had begun to add more secular topics to its predominantly Muslim curriculum. Also, the reforming prime minister Khair al-Din had at Tunis in 1875 established Sadiki College, a secondary school (lycee), which from the first taught a curriculum oriented toward the modern world, instruction being in Arabic and also in several European languages. Jews also had maintained their own schools, as did the more recently arrived Italians.

During the French Protectorate, the goals of Tunisian educators in general developed, so as to include more the introduction of modern fields of study, namely, those leading toward the utilitarian knowledge practiced in Europe. Accordingly, in France such skills were well known, and a French technical vocabulary entered working use in Tunisia for various Protectorate projects, commercial and industrial. The French language was the favored medium in new schools set up by the French Church, initially established primarily for children of French settlers, such as Collège Saint-Charles de Tunis in 1875. Yet many urban Tunisians also sought for their children learning opportunities oriented to the acquisition of modern skills useful in the workplace. The Tunisian elites struggled against Protectorate resistance to such access. Over time, and not without contested issues, a new educational regime was created, including instruction in French open to Tunisians. This took place in the political context of the Protectorate, of course, affecting the existing Muslim institutions of learning, secular Tunisian advancement, and the instruction of young French colons.

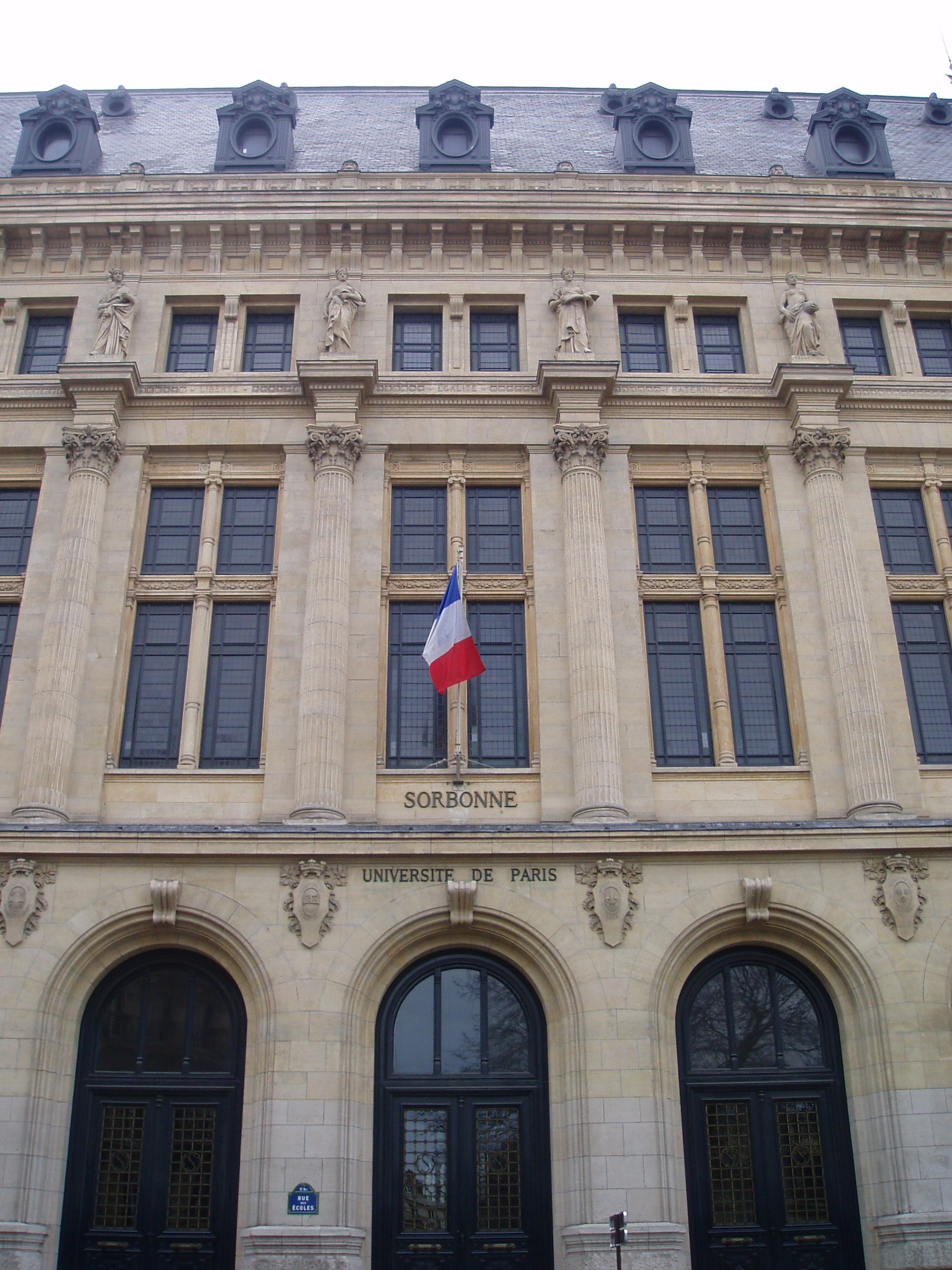
The Sorbonne in Paris, a pinnacle of French education

The innovations in education raised tender social issues in Tunisia. Yet many of such controversies were not new to the French, whose own educational institutions had met fundamental change during the 19th century. As France had come to develop and employ new technologies and the learning of the industrial age, French schooling adapted, and also became open to scrutiny. The balance between the teaching of traditional morality versus modern utilitarian skills, as well as exactly how and which morals to teach, became greatly contested in light of the wider French debate between religious versus secular values; it involved left-republican anticlerical politics. Similar issues arose later in Tunisia, including the views of the national movement.

In Tunisia the French in 1883 set up a Direction de l'Enseignement Public (Directorate of Public Education) to promote schools for teaching children of French officials and colons, and to further the spreading use of the French language. Its goals widened to include education in general. This Directorate eventually administered, or directed, all the different educational institutions and systems in Tunisia, which it sought to modernize, coordinate, grow and expand. Soon established in Tunis were the new mixed Collège Alaoui, and for women the new École Rue du Pacha and École Louise René Millet.

Several separate educational systems eventually resulted under the Protectorate. Serving French colons and Tunisians was a primary and secondary system closely coordinated with Metropolitan France, using the French language. From here students might attend a university in France. The government also directed a modern secular system of schools using mixed French and Arabic. The kuttab primary schools remained, keeping their religious instruction, yet enhanced by arithmetic, history, French, and hygiene; taught primarily in Arabic, the kuttab received government support. Thus Zitouna Mosque students might come from either the mixed secular or the kuttab religious schools. Zitouna education continued to expand, running four-year secondary schools at Tunis, Sfax, and Gabes, and also a program at the university level, while remaining a traditional Islamic institution. Sadiki College, however, became the premier lycée in the country, which offered to an emerging Tunisian elite a secular, well-developed, French-language program. These reforms set the stage for further advances made in Tunisian education since independence.

=== French context ===
France was not unfamiliar with rule over foreign lands, i.e., two distinct phases of expansion outside Europe, and one within: the 16th–18th century ventures in North America and in India, which lands were lost by the monarchy in 1763 prior to the French Revolution; the Napoleonic conquests over most of western and central Europe, lost in 1815; and then the 19th and 20th century colonialism in Africa, Asia, and Oceania.

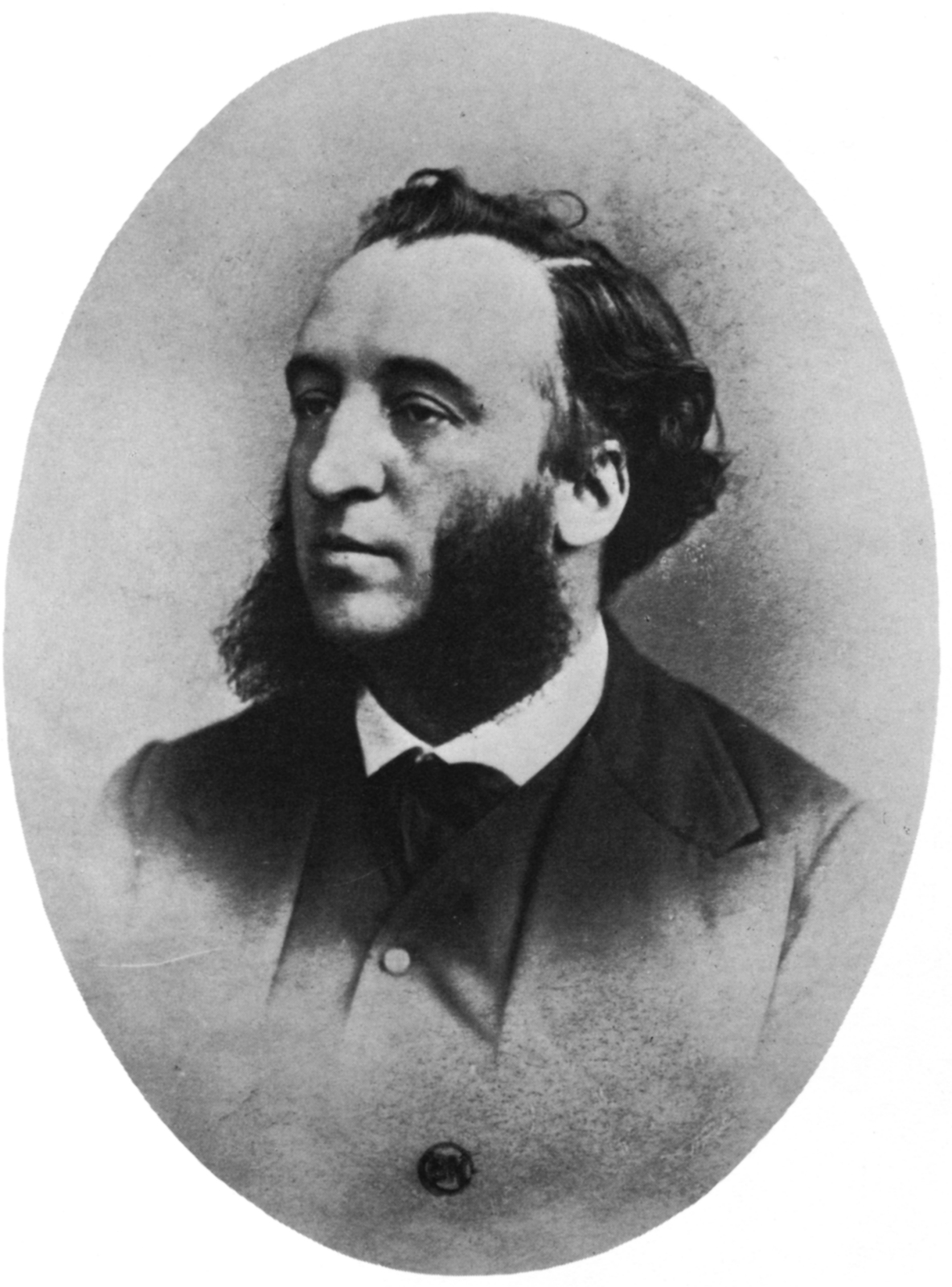
Republican leader Jules Ferry, premier: 1880–81, 1883–85

The latter expansion began when the restored royalist regime captured Algiers in 1830. That same year, however, the Légitimist Bourbon king was overthrown by the July Revolution in favor of a new Orléanist king. Yet this new version of constitutional monarchy, perhaps more liberal, did not resolve the persistent social conflict between (a) the traditional royalists (now divided), (b) the arrived and courted middle class, and (c) the neglected republicans (called "neo-Jacobins" after the French Revolution). The latter supported a democratic popular sovereignty and, from a distance, the emerging urban working class.

In both the aristocrat and the peasant, religious practice generally remained strong. In the emergent middle class, religion competed with secular values backed by "scientism". Many urban workers began neglecting religious practice In the late 19th century, republican anti-clericalism peaked. The divergent viewpoints evident here, under various guises, continued to divide French society, whether subtly, or dramatically, or catastrophically, well into the 20th century. A dissimilar though somewhat analogous social array may be discerned at work in the political dynamics of modern and independent Tunisia.

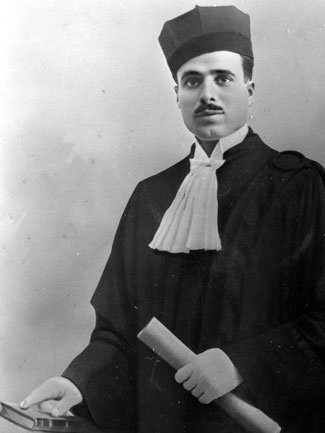
Habib Bourguiba studied French law in Paris, 1924–27

In 1848 the French people overthrew the July Monarchy of King Louis-Philippe; however, radical urban workers were quelled. Although for a time democracy replaced royalty, the voters remained conservative, still fearful of instability from the republican left, and under the sway of traditional social hierarchies. Over the republican candidate, Napoleon III won the December election of 1848 by a huge landslide. An 1851 coup then confirmed the result: the Second French Empire. Because of his 1871 defeat by Germany, France lost its two-centuries-old position as the leading power in continental Europe. Yet the new French Third Republic (1871–1940) arose, and quickly prospered. Many progressives from Asia, Africa, and the Americas still "regarded Paris as the spiritual capital of the world".

France returned to popular sovereignty. After first turning to constitutional monarchists who nonetheless instituted the republic, the voters later elected republicans and radicals, even socialists on occasion. The right was stymied by its own illusions, e.g., in the Dreyfus Affair. Even though socially and politically divided, in the next conflict, the disastrous World War (1914–1918), France emerged triumphant. In 1881 Jules Ferry (1832–1893), the republican premier and moderate anti-cleric, negotiated a political consensus to enable him to order the French army's conquest of Tunisia. During the subsequent Protectorate a change in French domestic political fortunes could directly impact Tunisian issues. For example, the 1936 election of Léon Blum and the Front Populaire reportedly improved official French comprehension of Tunisian aspirations.

During the 1920s Habib Bourguiba while studying for his law degree at the University of Paris astutely observed first hand how French politicians formulated and strategized their domestic agendas. Politically, Bourguiba's mind "had been formed in the Paris of the Third Republic." As independence leader and later the first President of Tunisia, Habib Bourguiba (1903–2000) became the constitutional architect of the Republic.

== Tunisian politics ==
Relating chiefly to the status quo ante and early decades of the French Protectorate, the political factors discussed here persisted throughout the course of French rule in Tunisia. Their relative strengths, one to the other, however, changed markedly over time.

In appraising the marked significance of the French era on Tunisia, one explanatory reason might be the large number of Europeans who became permanent residents in the country. Compared with the Ottomans, who settled perhaps several tens of thousands from their empire in Tunisia, the French and their Italian 'allies' settled hundreds of thousands.

=== Islamic context ===
Most Tunisians are accustomed to references made about the Muslim world, for spiritual inspiration, literary metaphor, historical analogy. Within Islam the three primary cultural spheres, each stemming from a world ethno-linguistic civilization, are: Arab, Iranian, Turkish. Each influenced Islam as a whole, as its sophisticated cultural contours bear witness. Each likewise benefited Tunisia. Preceding the French protectorate in Tunisia, the Ottoman Turks exercised varying degrees of suzerainty, and the ruling strata of Tunisia once spoke Turkish. Under its Arabizing rulers, the quasi-independent Beys, an attempt at modern reform was made, which used as a model similar reforms in the Ottoman Empire. Influence of the Iranian-sphere on Tunisia through the government has been only occasional, e.g., by the 8th-10th century Rustamid state, and by al-Afghani.

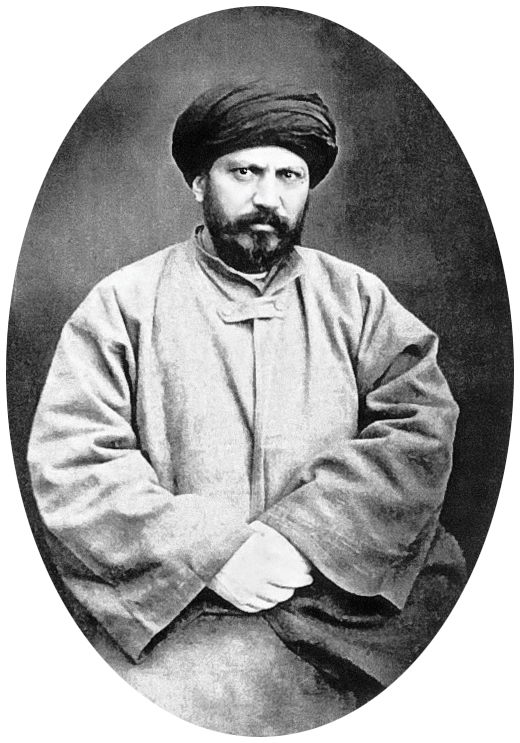
Jamal-al-Din Afghani (1839–1897), in 1883

Arab culture has strongly affected Tunisia since the 8th century conquest and subsequent Arab migrations. Tunisia became an Arabic-speaking, Muslim country closely connected with the Mashriq (the Arab east). Long before the recent rise of Europe, and for centuries sharing this distinction with distant China, Muslim Arab civilization led the world in the refinement and in the prosperity of its citizens. Yet since, Turkish armies arrived from Central Asia and Turks eventually moved into leadership position at various Muslim polities, beginning about the 10th century. Thereafter, the Arabs ostensibly rested content under their foreign, albeit Islamic, rule. Moreover, about the year 1500 European Christians, once their rather opaque and trailing neighbors along the Mediterranean shore, "at last caught up with and overtook Islam, though the latter was quite unaware of what was happening."

Nonetheless the Arabs still retained a well-acknowledged double esteem as (a) the creators of the ancient world's earliest civilizations (when most spoke another Semitic language, i.e., Akkadian or Canaanite or Aramaic, or spoke Egyptian), and later as (b) co-creators of the elegant and enduring Islamic civilization, with the desert Arabs (the original people of Muhammad), to whom they attached themselves as 'adopted' Semite cousins. Despite having earned and enjoyed such high esteem, the Arabs in more recent times found themselves thirsty for rejuvenation and renewal. During the 19th century a great renaissance began to stir among Arabs and among the Muslim peoples in general, giving rise to various reformers who conveyed their political and ideological messages.

Inspiring and enigmatic, Jamal al-Din al-Afghani (1839–1897) traveled widely to rally the Muslim world to unity and internal reform. Later while in Paris in 1884 al-Afghani published with Muhammad 'Abduh (see below) a journal al-'Urwa al-wuthqa ["The Strongest Link"] to propagate his message. He himself sought a leading position in government to initiate reinvigorating reforms. He managed for a time to associate with an Ottoman Sultan, and later with a Shah of Iran, but to no effect. Although advocating a pan-Islamic solution, al-Afghani also taught the adoption of a universal reason under Islamic principles whereby Muslim societies might be reformed and then master the European sciences; industry and commerce would transform Muslim material culture. Such modernizing did not convince the more traditionist among the ulema, but did energize a popular following across Islam which became committed to reform agendas. Such rational principles were often welcome by Tunisian nationalists.

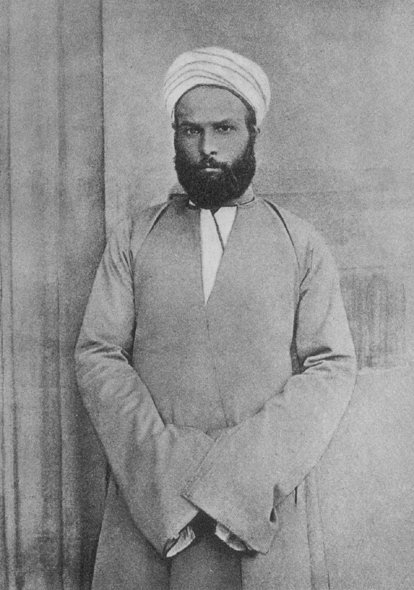
Muhammad Abduh, Egyptian (1849–1905)

Another reformer with lasting influence in Tunisia was the Egyptian Shaykh Muhammad 'Abduh (1849–1905), a follower of al-Afghani. A gifted teacher, he eventually became the Mufti of Egypt. 'Abduh cultivated reason and held the controversial view that in Muslim law the doors of ijtihad were open, i.e., permitting the learned to make an original interpretation of sacred texts. 'Abduh visited Tunisia twice. Together al-Afghani and 'Abduh have been called "the two founders of Islamic modernism".

In Tunisia a reformer also arose. Khair al-Din al-Tunsi (1810–1889) [Turkish name: Hayreddin Pasha] was an early reformer of Circassian origins. When a child he learned Turkish and eventually became an Ottoman Pasha. As a young man he was brought to Tunisia to enter the declining Turkish-speaking elite. Here he spent several decades in the service of several Beys (1840s-1877), when he chose to adopt the Maghrib as his own and learned Arabic. Khair al-Din has been discussed previously. He preceded al-Afghani, and appeared to be more traditionally religious. He came of age in the era of the Ottoman Tanzimat, a series of modern reforms begun in 1839. Khair al-Din advocated a modern rationalism in the reform of society and government, yet one respectful of Muslim institutions. Once in power in Tunisia to implement his reforms (1873–1877), Khair al-Din encountered stiff opposition and was replaced mid-steam.

Later the Tunisian Shaykh Mahammad al-Sanusi led a group which "adhered to the ideology expounded by Jamal al-Din al-Afghani and Shaykh Muhammad 'Abduh." An alim in the service of the Bey before the Protectorate commenced in 1881, thereafter al-Sunusi traveled east on pilgrimage where he claimed to have entered "an anti-Western secret society" founded by al-Afghani. Soon 'Abduh visited Tunisia, where he was greeted by "reformist ulama" supporters of Khayr al-Din. During the next year 1885 occurred a formal protest to the Bey against tax and tariff measures of the new French regime. Involved were 60 notables, featuring al-Sanusi and public demonstrations; it likely constituted an "alliance between mosque and bazaar." Yet the protest was ineffective; the dispute was settled. In character this protest group differed from the nationalist movement to come, but adumbrated it. Banished by the French, al-Sanusi responded with "a concilliatory letter" and was reinstated. During its first two decades the subject people remained "content to pursue Tunisian development within the Protectorate framework."

Alongside the pan-Islamic were conflated ethnic views, i.e., conflicting pan-Arab and pan-Turkic. Many Arabic-speaking countries under Ottoman rule had grown weary; a popular desire for self-rule under an Arab nationalism arose. In this regard Tunisia differed: an Arabic-speaking country but already long liberated from the Ottomans, governed by an autonomous Bey where the imperial hand was merely ceremonial. Tunisia experienced no fight against the Turkish empire, whereas during World War I many mashriq Arabs fought against Turkish armies for their independence.

Yet in 1881 Tunisia fell under European rule, as did Egypt in 1882, Morocco and Libya in 1912, and Syria and Iraq in 1919. Early in the 20th century the Tunisian resistance movement against France emerged. It later would enjoy two distinct sources of Islamic political culture. For Muslim fraternity, e.g., for a forum in which to compare ideas and programs, Tunisians could choose between: the Ottomans (latter Turkey), and the Arab world to the east (the Mashriq and Egypt).

=== Nationalist origins ===
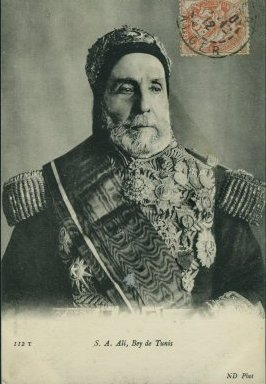
Ali Bey, b.1817, reign 1882–1902

The Bey of Tunis was the traditional, authoritarian ruler. Under the Protectorate the Bey's rule continued de jure, yet de facto control of the country passed to the French Resident General and his ministers, appointed in Paris. The Bey continued in his lesser role as a figurehead monarch. Yet his position had been tarnished by the court's "prodigality and corruption" and the cynical aristocracy. The harsh put down of the 1864 revolt in the Sahil was still remembered a century later. During the first decade, notables and conservative Tunisians had appealed to Ali Bey to effectively mediate with the French. His ability to maneuver was closely confined. "In Tunisia, obedience to the Bey meant submission to the French." Yet the Bey stirred some Tunisian culture into the foreign recipe.

Indeed, many Tunisians at first welcomed the progressive changes brought about by the French, but the general consensus that evolved was that Tunisians preferred to manage their own affairs. Before the French conquest, during the 1860s and 1870s Khair al-Din had introduced modernizing reforms in Tunisia. His innovative ideas, although acknowledging the ascendancy of Europe, remained conversant with Islamic tradition and favored reform on Islamic terms. He wrote an influential book.

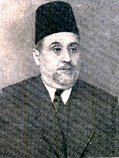
Abdelaziz Thâalbi 1876–1944

The learned Arabic weekly magazine al-Hādira [the Capital] was founded in 1888 by companions and followers of the reforming Beylical minister Khair al-Din. The weekly discussed politics, history, economics, Europe and the world, and was published until 1910. This moderate magazine of the Tunisian establishment articulated views that were often pitched to the baldiyya (merchants) and the ulama (clerics and jurists). It voiced perspectives found in Khair al-Din's 1867 book on Islam confronting the modern. The "organized body of reformers and patriots" who started the weekly were influenced by the Egyptian Muhammad 'Abduh and his 1884-1885 visit to Tunisia; Shaykh 'Abduh had advocated moderation. Many of the reasonable editorials in al-Hadirah were written by as-Sanusi. According to Tunisian author Ibn Ashūr, writing decades later, al-Sanusi's distasteful experience with the early Tunisian opposition to French rule had caused him to re-evaluate the Protectorate, positively. A radical weekly publication az-Zuhrah was openly critical of French policy, and ran from 1890 until suppressed in 1897. Another periodical uneasy with the status quo and terminated by French authorities was Sabil al-Rashad, 1895–1897. It was published by 'Abd al-'Aziz al-Tha'alibi, who was educated at Zaytuna. The young Tha'alibi, destined to play a leading intellectual role, was another directly inspired by 'Abduh of Cairo, and by earlier, local reformers, e.g., Mahmud Qabadu.

In 1896 Bashir Sfar and other advocates of renewal from al-Hādira founded al-Jam'iyah Khalduniya [the Khaldun Society]; its charter was approved by a French decree. The society provided a forum for sophisticated discussions; it was named after the famous medieval historian of Tunis Ibn Khaldun. According to professor Laroui, it "emphasized the need for gradual reform" of education and the family. Khalduniya also facilitated the role played by ulama progressives at Zitouna Mosque. Khalduniya, wrote Laroui "became increasingly French both in mentality and in language." The Khalduniya society "opened a window on the West for Arabic-speaking Tunisians," comments professor Perkins. It offered to the public free classes in European sciences. Many decades later, regarding the new political party Neo-Destour, Khalduniya (and Sadiki College) "channeled many young men, and a few women, into the party." Khalduniya also helped create the demand in Tunisia for foreign Arabic newspapers and magazines.

Other Tunisian periodicals continued to enter the marketplace of ideas. Ali Bach Hamba founded the French language journal le Tunisien in 1907, in part to inform the European public of Tunisian views. The opinions it expressed seemed not only to further mutual understanding, but to increase the unease and unrest. In 1909 Tha'alibi founded its Arabic language version at Tūnisī, which among other issues challenged the pro-Ottoman Hanba from a more 'Tunisian' view point. Tha'alibi (1876-1944) is described in 1902, when he returned from Egypt, as "with strange attire, tendencies, thought and pen." His reform ideas struck "conservative leaders" as "an attack on Islam." In 1903 ath-Tha'alibi was "brought to trial as a renegade" and "sentenced to two months imprisonment."

As French rule continued, it appeared increasingly determined to favor the French and Europeans over native Tunisians. Accordingly, the general tone of the Tunisian response grew bitter and hardened into a challenging resolve. Here professor Kenneth Perkins marks the "transition from advocacy of social change to engagement in political activism." In 1911 civil disturbances were ignited by the Zaytuni university students. One result was that Bach Hamba and Tha'alibi reached an accord. A political party was begun, al-Ittihad al-Islami, which thus expressed pan-Islamic leanings.

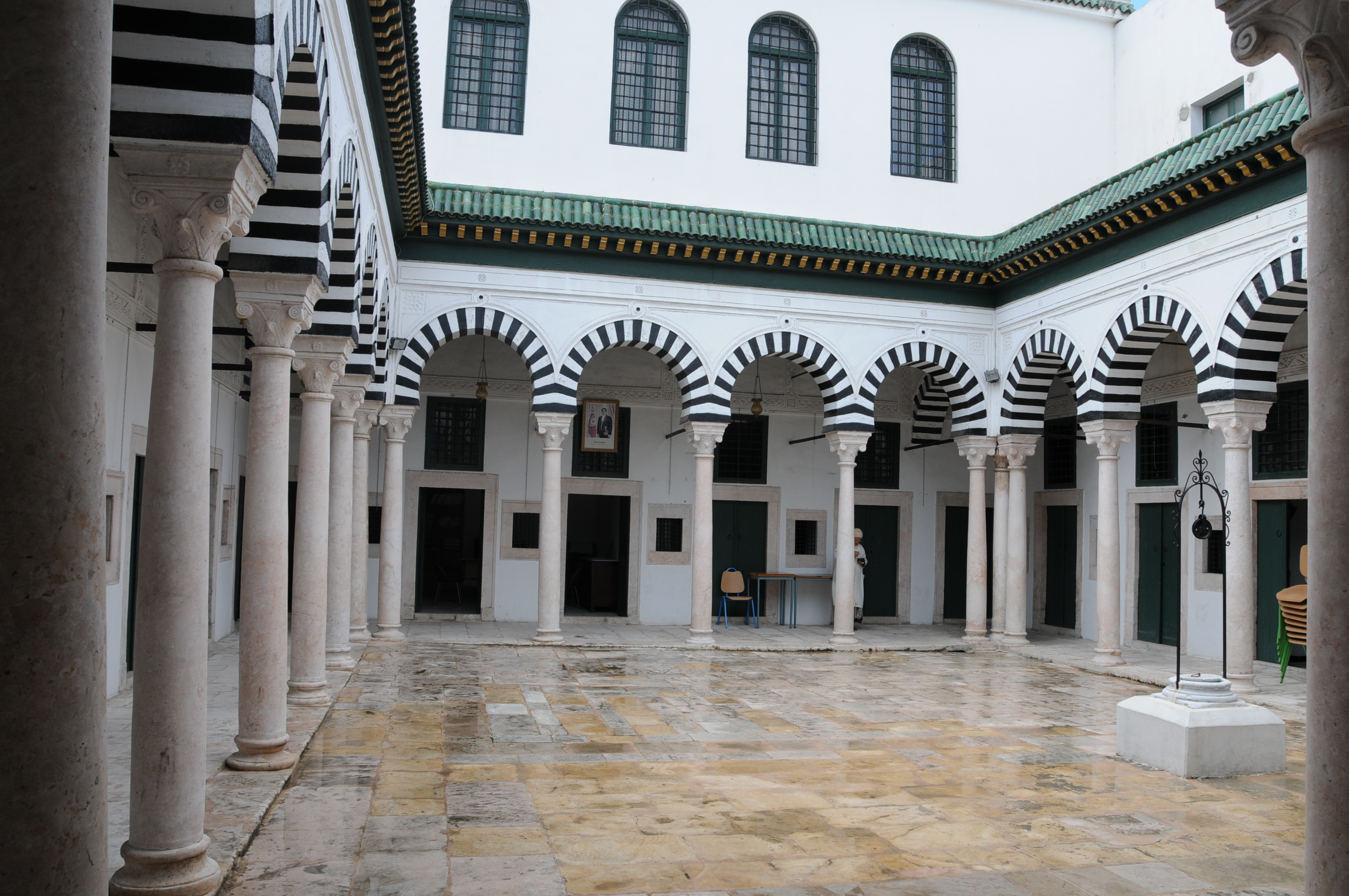
Ez-Zitouna University, Tunis

Late in 1911 issues concerning a Muslim cemetery, the Jellaz, sparked large nationalist demonstrations in Tunis. The protests and riots left dozens of Tunisians and Europeans dead. The French declared martial law; they blamed political agitators. In 1912 further demonstrations led to the popular Tunis Tram Boycott. In response the French authorities closed the nationalist newspapers and sent into exile Tunisian leaders, e.g., Tha'alibi and Bach Hamba. Tha'alibi later returned to Tunisia.

According to professor Nicola Ziadeh, "the period between 1906 and 1910 saw a definite crystallization of the national movement in Tunisia. This crystallization centered around Islam." By the eve of the First World War (1914–1918), Tunisian 'nationalists' had developed and it adherents encountered an opportunity to publicly define themselves, in terms not only domestic but in light of widespread trends and foreign events. Pan-Islam had been promoted by the Ottoman Sultan Abdulhamid, and such ideas also developed in Egypt and in India, and touched Tunisia. The more conservative opponents of the Protectorate felt its influence more strongly. Then in 1909 this sultan was deposed. In 1924 the Caliphate in Turkey was terminated by Mustafa Kemal.

"The intellectuals, the bourgeoisie, the students and the proletariat reacted against the French administration and economic measures; they defended their right of work against the immigrants; they demanded legal equality with strangers; they wanted to maintain the principle of Tunisian sovereignty."

The nucleus of the above naissant political party al-Ittihad al-Islami evolved into "The Evolutionist Party of Young Tunisians". Eventually it became simply Tunis al-fatat [Young Tunisians]. Yet loss of its leadership, due to the French crack-down in 1912, curtailed its effectiveness. Following the World War Tunis al-fatat developed into a loose term which encompassed a wide political-cultural spectrum of Tunisian opinion, from 'communists' to les Vieux Turbans [the Old Turbans]. In the 1920s there emerged its most vital, centrist element: a new alignment, the political party called Destour [Constitution]. The Destour "aimed to restore the Constitution of 1861".

=== Settler positions ===
When the French army occupied Tunisia, few Europeans were resident there, most being from Italy. In 1884 there were 19,000 Europeans, the majority Italians. In 1901 Europeans were 111,000, including 72,600 Italians, 24,200 French, and 12,000 Maltese (maltese-speaking from the nearby island, then a British colony). The French government soon sought to discover ways to increase the French population. Various incentives, chiefly economic, began to be offered to citizens who would relocate to Tunisia. Since France itself enjoyed a higher standard of living, to be attractive the incentives to potential settlers had to be quite substantial when compared to Tunisian incomes.

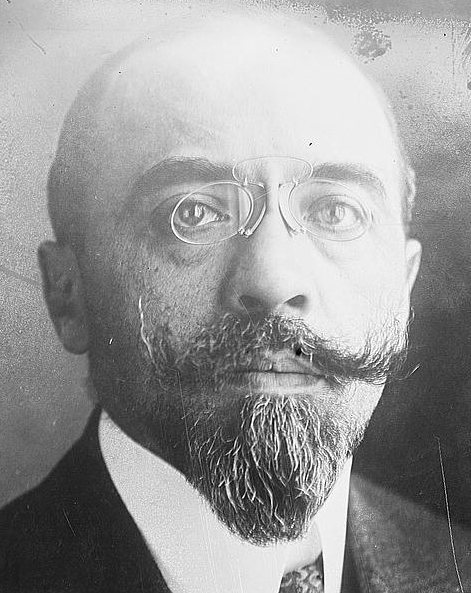
Albert Sarrault, Radical prime minister in the French Third Republic, unofficial leader of the colons

Although always relatively small in numbers (peaking at about 250,000), French settlers or colons became a very influential social stratum in Tunisia. They combined commercial-industrial expertise and know-how, with government privilege. Although not all the French were equally prosperous, ranging from rich to poor, nonetheless group cohesion was strong. French capital found investments in such activities as mining and railroads, which resulted in handsome returns. Their use of modern technology required a trained workforce, and French immigrants were invariably the workers hired. Such skilled jobs were among the highest paid in Tunisia. Settler homes and urban neighborhoods were often built following French models. Eventually a sense of pride and accomplishment in the modern development of the country came to be felt and relished by the newly dominant French community. Local Tunisians came to be stereotyped by some settlers as narrow and biased, the more rural the native population more primitive or confused. The settlers organized themselves into interest groups in order to maintain their leading position, to protect their engine of money-making and the source of Tunisia's relatively rapid development.

Tunisians chafed at being made second-class citizens in their own country. In French public relations, the major point that would win Tunisian favor was the French ability to modernize the economy and administration. Tunisians, however, wanted to share in the work and rewards of the new French-built enterprises. Eventually, the more far-seeing among resident French administrators were drawn to draft French development plans so as to include significant participation by the Tunisian people. Nonetheless, other French administrators were more inclined to award business and employment opportunities to French settlers, for both local political reasons and colonial policy.

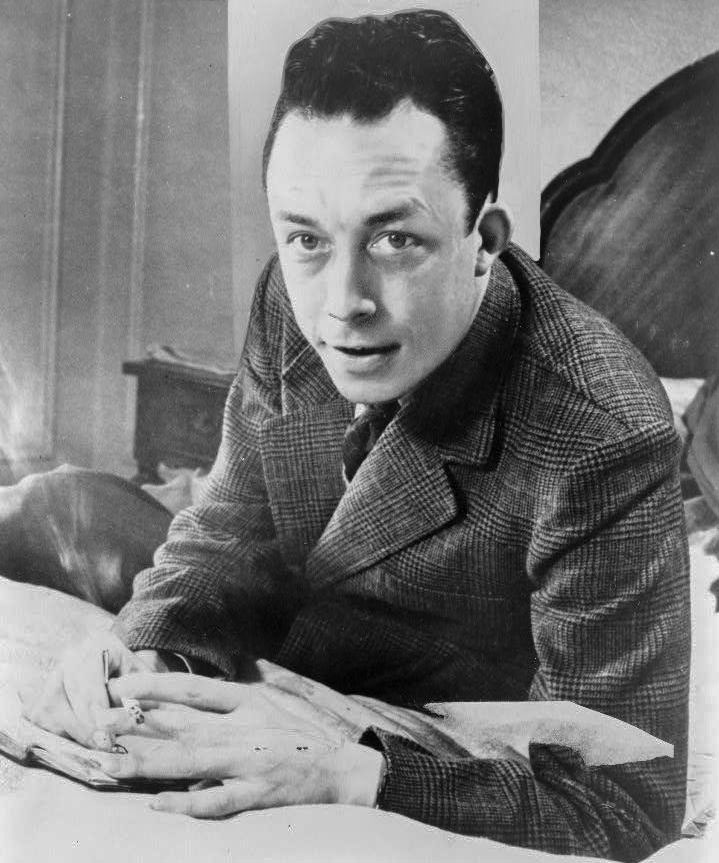
Albert Camus 1913–1960, Pied-Noir of Algiers, an existentialist conflicted over his loyalty to his settler origins versus his adult sympathy for the maghriban rebels

Usually, in response to any proposed economic development, French settlers would marshal their influence in order to reap the major benefits. For many French, such benefits were the raison d'être for their living in Tunisia. If the local French administrator on occasion decided against them, they would hasten to appeal to their political contacts in Paris. These they carefully cultivated, e.g., through the large, political pressure group Parti-Colonial. A growing conflict naturally emerged between the interests of the settlers and those of Tunisians; a struggle which became increasingly sour. The French officials themselves were sometimes uncomfortably divided as to which course to take, and exactly how to take it.

Settlers expressed their views in their political and cultural associations, and commercial trade groups. Newspapers and magazines in French were published by and for the settler communities, e.g., La Tunisie Française. The various forums enabled the individual settler to follow discussions that articulated their hopes and anxieties, to read journalists whose reports were pitched to their points of view, and to discern the talking points of their politicians, all of which enhanced their solidarity and effectiveness. Settler interests could be diverse across the gamut of social issues at home in France, while in North Africa they united for the struggle to defend their common advantages and privileges.

Even so, some French settlers became known for their countenance of, or support for, maghriban political aspirations. Although a small minority of the colon community, their numbers were sufficient in Tunisia to support the French-language publication Petit Monde. It presented humanistic articles that attempted to span the gulf of alienation, was sympathetic to Tunisians, and discussed self-governance. Other colons, however, might heap scorn on any such European who broke ranks. One dissenting colon was the French official and later academic Jacques Berque. Another, the well-known author Albert Camus, was consciously conflicted over his native Algeria. His 1942 novel L'Étranger drew a portrait of a young French colon, his social disconnection and his crime and trial. Camus labored for mutual comprehension between the conflicting sides. Even after the French exodus, Berque remained attached to the Maghrib, and connected to its newly independent peoples. Berque also was able to perceive the multiple faces of the French situation, its layered context. He mentions that during the severe economic distress of 1934 the colons of Tunis mounted a political demonstration at Gambetta Park, and declared with veiled ambiguity, "we love this land, we love its atmosphere, harsh though it is, and even its natives, with whom we wish to live in amity... ."

=== French policy ===
Although the French often presented a united front in Tunisia, internally they had brought with them to North Africa their own long-standing national divisions. Despite such quarrels, many on the political left and in the Christian churches eventually agreed to cooperate in spreading the 'advantages' of French culture in Africa and Asia. Yet an anti-colonialist dissent persisted. Albert Sarrault, a leading French colonialist, "lamented in 1935 that most of the French remained indifferent about colonies." In Tunisia a hierarchy developed: the projects of the French state came first, followed the interests of the French settlers. The more numerous Italian settlers were rivals of the French who later became associated as allies, yet remained distinct. Tunisian Jews, many families resident since late antiquity, others relatively recent immigrants from Italy, often seemed to occupy a precarious position in between the established local traditions and the new European modernity. The majority Tunisian Muslims carefully observed the regime of the French occupiers. They were distinguished by their attitude toward French policies, whether as persuaded contributors, as neutrals, as holdouts, or later as political opponents.

Under the French regime, a variety of activities were given encouragement. The Church sent missionaries, who were directed from the new cathedral in Tunisia, south across the Sahara to what became Francophone Black Africa where many mission communities were established. Yet the Eucharistic Congress of 1930 in Tunis drew the public reproach of Muslims. Protectorate projects enlisted civil engineers and city planners who developed designs from which were built many public improvements. These served community needs for water, communication, health, sanitation, travel and transportation. Civic comfort was enhanced. Business and commercial opportunities were multiplied.

The Tunisians populace appreciated the introduction of such improvements, but noticed the advantages the Protectorate bestowed on the European newcomers. Community leaders began to appeal to the self-proclaimed public virtues of the French state, e.g., droit humane, in order to obtain equal treatment with the French colons. Yet at first such appeals resulted more often than not in disappointment, increasingly so, enough that many Tunisians turned cynical regarding the Protectorate's claims. Mass movements arose. Yet not all French officials were non-responsive. From the start, the fundamental nature of the colonial enterprise had been disputed. Various causes and/or justifications were proposed during the period of the Protectorate as its self-explanation: for revenue and natural resources, for export markets, for cultural expansion and national prestige, for career opportunities and jobs for the arriving colons, or as a frontier for the military. French policy, in attempting to satisfy such a variety of rationals, could shift in focus from one to another, often depending on which French administrator made the choices and the immediate circumstances. As a natural result French policy was not always consistent over time. During the latter decades of the Protectorate, local French officials increasing also sought to better address the needs, complaints, and demands of the Tunisian people. On many issues, the Protectorate could be confronted with its own contradictory objectives, and underlying political conflicts, leading to difficult decisions or negotiations.

== Art and culture ==
Traditional arts continued in Tunisia, e.g., in music the ma'luf a form of the andalusian. Regarding all forms of music, for the first time the introduction of recording techniques allowed music playing to be preserved for later enjoyment and for posterity. Indeed, all of the fine arts were stimulated and challenged, not only by European technology, but by French exemplars and art theories. In literature, while the conventions of Arabic poetry continued to develop and thrive, other writers adopted new forms modeled on French literature, such as the novel. The construction of theatres under the Protectorate increased the opportunities for public performances, both of older Tunisian forms and of experiments in new genres. In particular, modern inventions surrounding the simultaneous capture of light and sound made an entirely new form of art possible: film.

== Chronology ==
=== Versailles 1919 ===
Organized nationalist sentiment among Tunisians, driven underground by the French following the popular demonstrations in 1912, resurfaced after the Great War. Traveling to Paris Abdel Aziz Tha'alibi sought to present to the Versailles Peace Conference Tunisia's case against the Protectorate. He published his book La Tunisie martyre which, among other things, endorsed a constitutional program based on the 1861 precedent. Encouragement came from many directions. In 1919, the League of Nations was founded. Here many nations lobbied for sovereignty, including the Wafdist tafwid (delegation) of Egypt. Turkey under Atatürk rejected the Verssailes borders and fought successfully to establish their national independence on their own terms. The Bolshevik revolution in Russia had resulted in a new state power which angrily confronted the international order, and began to organized and fund subversive groups in order to overthrow existing regimes. The colonial order, although in appearances as vigorous as ever, had been seriously shaken by the devastation of war. The prophetic might discern that it was the beginning of the end of the colonial era.

=== Tunisian Destour ===
Nationalists established the Destour (Constitution) Party in 1920. Called popularly Le Destour, the official name was Al-Hisb Al-Horr Ad-Destouri At-Tounsi or Le Parti Libre Constitutionnel Tunisien. Tha'alibi was a founding member. The party negotiated an informal alliance with the Bey, which annoyed the French. In 1922 Lucien Sanit, the new French Resident General, granted minor reforms: a Ministry of Justice under Tahir b. Khayr al-Din, and a Grand Council of Tunisia which was purely consultative and in which the French were over-represented. This setback provoked turmoil in the Destour Party. Under French threat, Tha'alibi left Tunisia in 1923. Nationalist attention focused on economic issues in 1924. A mutual aid society was begun, but did not survive an episode of economic disruption caused by a wave of strikes.

The Confédération Générale des Travailleurs Tunisiens (CGTT) had been formed by M'hammad Ali with assistance from the Destour party. The CGTT was a nationalist alternative to the established, communist-led, French union the CGT. It then successfully recruited Tunisian workers in large numbers from CGT ranks. The CGTT proved more aggressive, and was actively engaged in Tunisian issues and nationalist politics. In 1924 the Protectorate had its leaders jailed. The Destour party had already distanced itself. During the 1940s Farhat Hached had then followed this example and organized the Union Générale Tunisienne du Travail (UGTT) quickly entered into a lasting alliance with Neo-Dustour. The Neo-Destour party was established in 1934 due to a split in the leadership of Destour. Habib Bourguiba and others established it as the next generation's continuance of the original spirit of Destour. The French authorities later arrested its leaders and harassed the Neo-Destour, diminishing its presence and effectiveness.

=== World War II ===
As in the first World War, Tunisians troops were transported to France to fight against the German armies in World War II. Three infantry regiments, one after the other, disembarked at Marseille commencing in March, 1940, and entered the Battle of France. After the French defeat they were back in Tunisia by September. Yet Tunisian units fought again. By November 1942 the French forces in Tunisia were active on the Allied side. Tunisian troops under the French flag then fought the German and Italian army in Tunisia. Later Tunisian units joined the Allied invasion of Italy, entering Rome; they then fought in the liberation of France. At war's end in 1945 the Tunisians were exhausted and in Stuttgart.

With the 1940 fall of France, French authorities in Tunisia immediately supported the Vichy regime, which continued to govern the southern provinces of France after its capitulation to German forces. Many Tunisians had felt some satisfaction at France's defeat. In July, 1942, Moncef Bey acceded to the Husaynid throne. Immediately he took a nationalist position, asserting Tunisian rights against the new Resident General appointed by Vichy. He toured the country, dispensing with beylical protocol. Soon becoming very popular as the new voice of Tunisians, Moncef Bey had assumed the place of the leadership of the Destour and Neo-Destour parties, which remained effectively suppressed by the French.

Map of the Tunisia campaign

Near Alexandria, Egypt, the German General Erwin Rommel, lacking supplies and reinforcements, in November 1942 lost the decisive battle of al-Alamein to the newly replenished forces of British General Bernard Montgomery. The fighting ending November 4, 1942. Then came the Tunisia campaign. On November 7, the Allies under American General Dwight Eisenhower began landing forces in Morocco (Operation Torch). Meanwhile, the German Afrika Korps with the Italian Army retreated from Egypt westward to Tunisia and set up defensive positions at the Mareth Line south of Gabès. The British followed on its heels. With reinforcements the Afrika Korps had some success against the "green" American and Free French advancing from the west. That enabled operations against the British at the Mareth Line, which ultimately failed perhaps due to Ultra intercepts. The Allies broke through the Axis lines and an intensive Allied air campaign forced the Afrika Korps to surrender on May 11, 1943. The Italian Army of General Messe fought a desperate last battle in Cape Bon and Enfidaville and surrendered two days later. Tunisia became a staging area for the invasion of Sicily later that year. General Eisenhower subsequently wrote of the occupation of Tunisia (evidently following an anti-colonial policy, yet one compromised) "far from governing a conquered country, we were attempting only to force a gradual widening of the base of government, with the final objective of turning all internal affairs over to popular control."

After the Allied landings in Morocco in late 1942, the governments of both Vichy France and of Tunisia had been taken over by German forces. During this period (November 1942 to May 1943) Moncef Bey "judiciously refused to take sides". He did, however, use what leverage he could muster to appoint the first Tunisian government since 1881, which was inclusive of the country's then political landscape, containing some pro-Allied elements. Later, with the Allied victory and advent of the Allied control, French colons began to falsely denounce Moncef Bey as a German collaborator, seeking his immediate removal; they were appeased. "Late in 1943 Musif Bey was deposed by the French on the pretext that he had collaborated with the enemy."

Habib Bourguiba, the leading figure in the Neo-Destour party, imprisoned in Vichy France, had been taken to Rome by the Germans, and feted there to further Italian designs on Tunisia; then he was repatriated to his Axis-occupied homeland. But Bourguiba remained pro-Independence without being anti-French (his wife being French). In Tunisia, however, some pro-German Destour leaders had been willing to work with the Third Reich, despite Bourguiba's persistent warnings. After the war, Bourguiba's American connections managed to clear him of false charges that he was a collaborator. With his compatriot Salah Ben Youssef and others he began rebuilding the Neo-Destour political organization.

=== Post-war context ===
After World War II the French managed to regain control of Tunisia as well as other administered territories in North Africa. However, the struggle for national independence continued and intensified. This phenomenon was not particular to Tunisia, or to North Africa. Separately organized independence movements were becoming widespread throughout Asia and Africa.

United Nations flag

Arab League symbol

The stature of the Soviet Union, with its ostensibly 'anti-colonialist' ideology, was enhanced by its position as a primary victor in the war. Its doctrines demanded a harsh judgment on the French in North Africa. In this vein continued writers who may not have been communists. During the French presence, the maghriban resistance was articulated in sharper and more combative terms as the independence movements intensified. Especially bitter in accusation was the works of the iconic, anti-colonial writer of Algeria, Frantz Fanon. The United States of America, the other major victor and power following the war, also articulated a stance against the continued existence of colonies, despite remaining in alliance with European colonial states. Yet within several years of the war's end, Syria, Lebanon, and Egypt had become independent, as had India and Pakistan and Sri Lanka, Burma, Indonesia, and the Philippines. In 1945 the Arab League was formed in Cairo which soon included Egypt, Iraq, Jordan, Lebanon, Saudi Arabia, Syria, and Yeman. Soon the Destour's Habib Bourguiba secretly traveled to Cairo where he took up residence while advancing political causes, e.g., the Maghreb Liberation Committee. As the League of Nations had inspired an increase in the awakening of national conscienceness among subject peoples after the first World War, so also did the foundation of the United Nations in San Francisco following World War II. The U.N. provided a forum in which the issue of independence for nations could be advanced before 'world public opinion'. Hence the struggle for independence in Tunisia became part of the global conversation.

== Tunisian nationalism ==
=== Political struggle ===
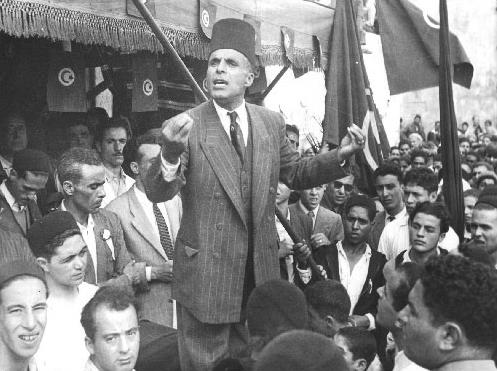
Bourguiba giving a speech in Bizerte, 1952

After World War II the Neo-Destour Party reemerged under the leadership of Habib Bourguiba and Salah ben Yusuf. Already Bourguiba had enlisted the close support of the national labor union, the Union Générale des Travailleurs Tunisiens (UGTT). It was the successor of the short-lived Tunisian union organization, the Confédération (CGTT), which the French had suppressed in 1924. During the 1940s Farhat Hached had then followed the CGTT example and organized the UGTT, which was nationalist and not associated with the communist-led French union CGT. Quickly UGTT entered into a lasting alliance with Neo-Dustour. As Secretary General of the party, ben Yusuf pursued a policy of opening it to all Tunisians. He formed alliances with large commercial interests, with the Zaituna Mosque activists, and with pan-Arab groups favored by the Bey.

In Paris in 1950 Bourguiba had presented the French government a program for gradual independence. Eventually the French proceeded to introduce limited reforms, e.g., in which the nationalist would receive half the seats in a legislative council, with the other half retained by French settlers. Due to the lack of significant progress during 1954 armed groups of Tunisians, called Fellagha, began to muster and conduct operations in resistance to French rule, beginning with attacks in the mountains.

The Tunisians coordinated their national struggle with independence movements in Morocco and Algeria, although Tunisia seemed to be better at the fine points of marshalling its nationalist forces. Moroccan professor Abdullah Laroui later wrote about the social and historical similarities between the independence movements in the three different countries of the Maghrib.

=== Internal conflicts ===
During subsequent Tunisian negotiations with France, a conflict erupted between the rival leaders of Neo-Destour. Habib Bourguiba believed he gained an advantage in accepting an interim autonomy before mounting the final push for full independence. Salah ben Yusuf demanded nothing less than an immediate settlement for the ultimate prize. In the ensuing political contest for control of the movement, Bourguiba managed to best ben Yusuf, who was eventually expelled from Neo-Dustur. He then left Tunisia for residence in Cairo.

== Independence ==
=== Final negotiations ===
Ultimately faced with simultaneous defeat at Dien bien Phu in Vietnam, and the upsurge of revolution in Algeria, France agreed to the end of the Protectorate in Tunisia. In the decades-long struggle for independence, Neo-Destour leaders were able to gain independence for Tunisia by maneuver and finesse.

=== French withdrawal ===
In Tunisia Albert Memmi had voiced a less sanguinary view than Fanon's, but nonetheless one not very sympathetic if less harsh in his appraisal of many French settlers. He writes of the colon that if "his living standards are high, it is because those of the colonized are low." Memmi describes the settler's pecuniary motives and identity:

"The change involved in moving to a colony... must first of all bring a substantial profit... You go to a colony because jobs are guaranteed, wages high, careers more rapid and business more profitable. The young graduate is offered a position, the public servant a higher rank, the businessman substantially lower taxes, the industrialist raw materials and labor at attractive prices." *** Perhaps later "he is often heard dreaming aloud: a few more years and he will take leave of this profitable purgatory and will buy a house in his own country." *** Yet if in fact "one day his livelihood is affected, if 'situations' are in real danger, the settler then feels threatened and, seriously this time, thinks of returning to his own land."

That presents a rather dismal portrait of the colon before his impending tragedy. After Tunisian independence in 1956, the new sovereign regime began to make distinctions between its citizens and foreigners living in Tunisia. Facing an existential choice, the majority of French residents, including families in Tunisia for generations, then made the arrangements to return to their "own land." Tunisians filled their vacated positions. "Between 1955 and 1959, 170,000 Europeans--roughly two-thirds of the total--left the country." This disastrous ending belies the otherwise mixed but not unfavorable results of the French era. Jacques Berque writes, "Greater progress would have to be made, great sufferings undergone before either side would consent to admit the other's [place in history]." Berque later cautioned that one should "abstain from facile anachronistic judgments in considering the things and the people of an epoch that is past."

== See also ==
- History of Tunisia
- Hafsid dynasty
- Barbary Coast
- List of Beys of Tunis
- Italian Tunisians
- French conquest of Tunisia
- Tunisia Campaign
- Tunisia
- History of Africa
