= Noble Quran =

Noble Quran may refer to:

- Noble Quran (Hilali–Khan), a translation of the Quran by Muhammad Muhsin Khan and Muhammad Taqi-ud-Din al-Hilali
- The Noble Quran: Meaning With Explanatory Notes, by Taqi Usmani, 2007
- The Noble Qur'an – A New Rendering of its Meaning in English, by Abdalhaqq and Aisha Bewley, 1999

== See also ==
- Quran
- Quran translations
