= Marwan Jabour =

Palestinian terrorist (born 1977)

- Born: 1977 (age 48–49); Amman, Jordan
- Arrested: 2004-05-09; Lahore; Pakistani security officials
- Released: 2006-06-30; Jordan
- Detained at: CIA's network of black sites
- Status: Released without charge after over two years extrajudicial detention

Marwan Jabour is a former captive held in the CIA's network of black sites. He was raised in Saudi Arabia by his Palestinian guest worker parents. He moved to Pakistan for study, in 1994.

The Washington Post interviewed Mawrwan Jabour at his home in Pakistan, after his release. They reported that he had been accused of being an "al Qaeda paymaster". According to its report, he confirmed he had traveled to Afghanistan for military training, in 1999, because he hoped to travel to Chechnya to help Chechens fight Russia. But he told the Washington Post he was told it would not be possible for him to travel to Chechnya, so he returned to Pakistan.

He confirmed that after the American invasion of Afghanistan some of the men he trained with in Afghanistan in 1999 sought him out in Pakistan. These men had fled the war zone, with their families, and asked for his help. He described their wives and children being seriously wounded. He acknowledged that, with financing from al Qaeda, he helped several dozen individuals with food, medicine and travel documents.

He was captured in early 2004, and transferred to the CIA's network of secret interrogation centers on June 16, 2004. The Washington Post reports that American security officials confirmed he was held by the CIA, but would not discuss his accounts of conditions there. He was able to help human rights workers to place a number of the other individuals who had been held by the CIA.

Human Rights Watch published a fifty-page report on February 26, 2007 based on their own interviews with Marwan Jabour. Marwan Jabour told Human Rights Watch that he was beaten during the six weeks he spent in Pakistani custody. He said a friend he was visiting, and another guest, were taken into Pakistani custody at the same time he was. He told Human Rights Watch none of the men, women and children he helped were affiliated with Al Qaida.

Other techniques Marwan Jabour described experiencing included sleep deprivation, stress positions, enforced nudity, the administration of psychoactive drugs and having a rubber cord tied around his penis so he could not urinate. He said he wasn't beaten in US custody, but he was subjected to sleep deprivation and stress positions there too, and he was shown a small wooden box where he was told Khalid Sheikh Mohammed had been confined for extended periods of time, and threatened that this technique could be applied to him too.

According to the Taipei Times, Paul Gimigliano, a CIA spokesman, issued a statement in response to the Human Rights Watch report. According to Gimigliano the CIA's program of secret extrajudicial detention and use of extended interrogation techniques was:

- "...with great care and close review, producing vital information that has helped disrupt plots and save lives."
- "...another key, lawful tool in the fight against terror."
- "The United States does not conduct or condone torture, nor does it transfer anyone to other countries for the purpose of torture."

== Other captives about whom Marwan Jabour offered new details ==
name	nationality	notes
Abdul Basit	Saudi or Yemeni	Marwan Jabour met Abdul Basit soon after being transferred to US custody. He said he was either a Saudi or a Yemeni.; His current location is unknown.
Mohammed al-Afghani	Afghanistan	An Afghan raised in Saudi Arabia by parents who were guest workers there.; He was captured in Peshawar, Pakistan, in May 2004.; He was transferred to US custody on June 16, 2004, at the same time as Marwan Jabour.; His current location is unknown.
Khalid Sheikh Mohammed	Kuwait; Pakistan	Reported that his interrogators showed him a small box they told him Khalid Sheikh Mohammed had been confined to, for long periods of time, to encourage him to answer questions. He said he was threatened that he too would be confined to this box if he didn't cooperate.; Transferred to Guantanamo on September 6, 2006.
Majid Khan	Pakistan	Found an inscription in one of his cells, from Majid Khan, showing he too had been held in that facility.; Transferred to Guantanamo on September 6, 2006.
Ayoub al-Libi	Libya	Was transferred from Pakistani custody to CIA custody with Marwan Jabour on June 16, 2004.
Abu Yasir Al Jaza'iri	Morocco	Apprehended in Lahore on March 15, 2003 by Pakistani security officials and the FBI.; Seen by Marwan Jabour in CIA custody on a number of occasions.; Yassir Al Jazeeri told Marwan that his arm had been crippled by beatings in US custody.; Marwan said he could "see the marks of torture on his body".; Yassir Al Jazeeri told Marwan he had been kept in a prison where he had been subjected to loud music for four months straight.; His name was listed on the "Terrorists no longer a threat" list on July 19, 2006.
Retha al-Tunisi	Tunisia	Marwan was shown a picture of Retha al-Tunisi while in CIA custody.; Amnesty International speculates he may be Ridah bin Saleh al Yazidi—currently in Guantanamo.
Spin Ghul	Niger	Marwan was shown a picture of Spin Ghul while in CIA custody.
Shoeab as-Somali or Rethwan as-Somali	Somalia	Marwan Jabour was shown a picture of this man, which he believed he recognized had been taken in the same facility he was currently detained in, starting in December 2004. He recognized him from his picture, because he had known him prior to his detention.; Current location unknown.
Adnan		Marwan Jabour met Adnan soon after being transferred to US custody.; His current location is unknown.
Hudaifa		Marwan Jabour met Hudaifa soon after being transferred to US custody.; His current location is unknown.
