= List of current detainees at Guantanamo Bay =

As of January 6, 2025, 15 detainees remain at Guantanamo Bay.

== Held in law-of-war detention but recommended for transfer if security conditions met ==
#	Photo	Name	Other name(s)	ISN	Detained	Country	Notes
1		Muin al-Din Jamal al-Din al-Fadil Abd al-Sattar	Omar al-Farouq	309	2002	Stateless Rohingya; Myanmar prior to the 2017 Rohingya genocide	
2		Ismail Ali Faraj Ali Bakush	Abu al-Dhahab al-Khamsi	708	2002	Libya	
3		Guled Hassan Duran	Gouleed Hassan Dourad	10023	2006	Somalia	

== Held in indefinite law-of-war detention and not recommended for transfer ==
#	Photo	Name	Other name(s)	ISN	Detained	Country
1		Zayn al-Abidin Muhammad Husayn	Abu Zubaydah, Hani	10016	2006	Saudi Arabia
2		Mustafa Faraj Muhammad Muhammad Masud al-Jadid al-Uzaybi	Abu Faraj al-Libi	10017	2006	Libya
3		Muhammad Rahim	Muhammad Rahim al-Afghani, Abdul Basir	10029	2008	Afghanistan

== Charged in military commissions system ==
#	Photo	Name	Other name(s)	ISN	Detained	Country	Notes
1		Mustafa Ahmed Adam al-Hawsawi		10011	2006	Saudi Arabia	
2		Ramzi Mohammed Abdullah bin al-Shibh	Abu Ubaydah	10013	2006	Yemen	
3		Walid Muhammad Salih bin Mubarak bin Attash	Khallad	10014	2006	Yemen	
4		Abd al-Rahim Hussein Muhammed Abdu al-Nashiri	Abu Bilal al-Makki	10015	2006	Saudi Arabia	
5		Ali Abdul Aziz Ali	Ammar al-Baluchi	10018	2006	Pakistan	
6		Encep Nurjaman	Hambali, Riduan Isamuddin	10019	2006	Indonesia	
7		Khalid Sheikh Mohammed	KSM, Mukhtar	10024	2006	Pakistan	

== Convicted in military commissions system ==
#	Photo	Name	Other name(s)	ISN	Detained	Country	Notes
1		Ali Hamza Ahmad Suliman al-Bahlul	Abu Anas al-Makki	39	2002	Yemen	Convicted in 2008 of conspiring with al-Qaeda, soliciting murder and providing material support for terrorism, and sentenced to life imprisonment. However, all convictions except for conspiracy were overturned in 2013. Conspiracy conviction was upheld in 2016.
2		Nashwan Abdulrazaq Abdulbaqi al-Tamir	Abd al-Hadi al-Iraqi, Nashwan al-Tamir	10026	2007	Iraq	Reached a secret plea agreement in 2022 so that al-Tamir would serve no more than 10 years in confinement, regardless of what sentence he received from a military jury.

== See also ==
- Enhanced interrogation techniques
