= Mohamed Ali El Hammi =

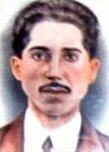
- Born: October 15, 1890; El Hamma, Tunisia
- Died: May 10, 1928 (aged 37); Saudi Arabia
- Occupation: Political activist

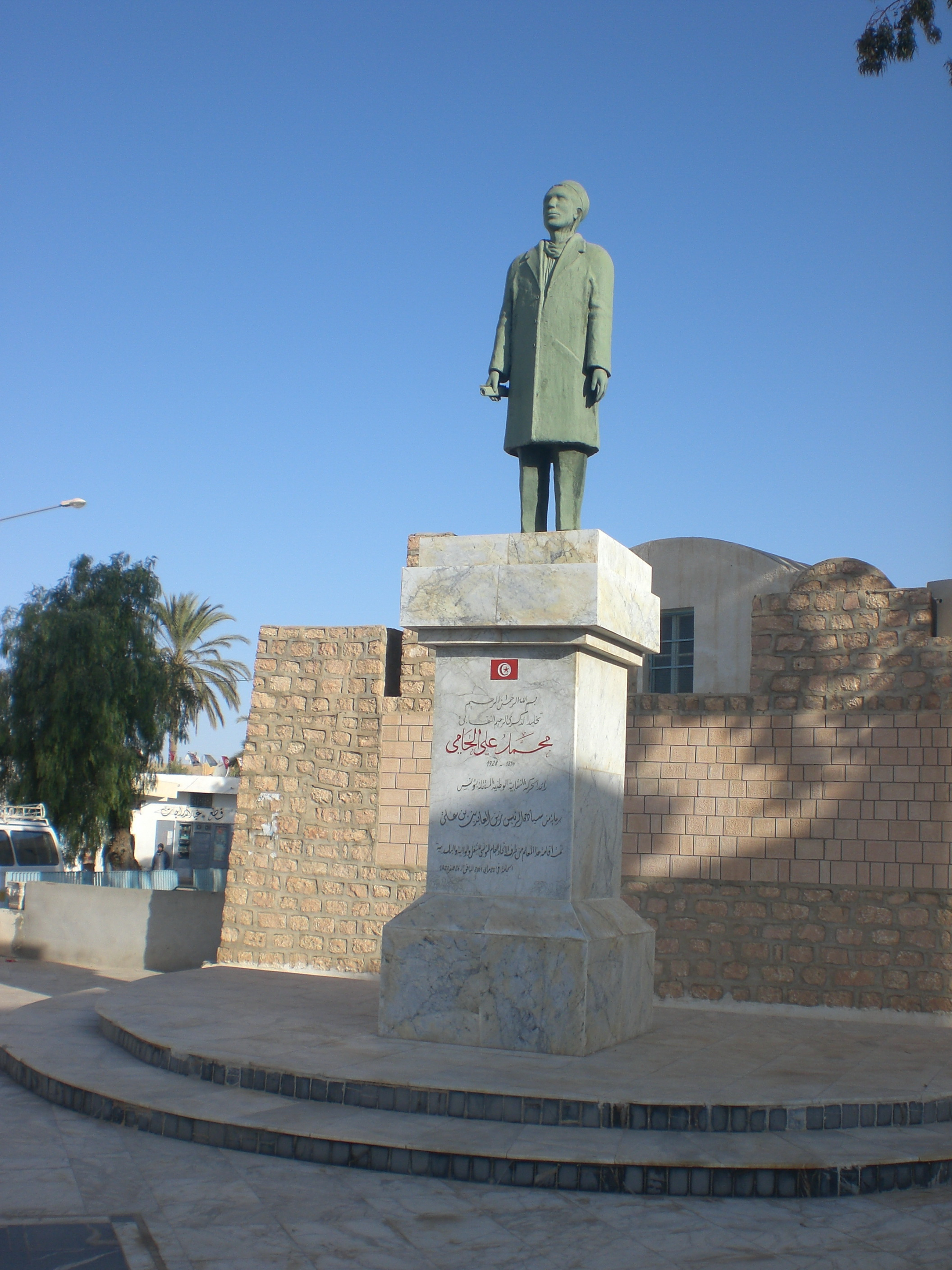
Statue of Mohamed El Hammi in El Hamma founded in 2001

Mohamed Ali El Hammi (Arabic: محمد علي الحامي; 15 October 1890 – May 10, 1928) was an early twentieth-century Tunisian labor organizer during the era of the French protectorate over Tunisia. He is deemed as the father of Tunisian syndicalism.

== Life and legacy ==
He was born in El Hamma, Gabès, Tunisia. He moved to Tunis at age 8 when his mother died. He began his professional life as a personal driver for the Hungarian consul in Tunis. He also worked as a porter before obtaining his driving license in 1908. He then left for Germany and studied economics and political science at the University of Berlin.

He founded the Confédération générale des travailleurs tunisiens (General Confederation of Tunisian Workers) in 1924, a year after returning to the country. He led strikes and formed regional unions across Tunisia. He was a friend and contemporary of Tahar Haddad.

He was arrested and exiled by the French in 1925.

== Death ==
On May 10, 1928, he died in a mysterious car crash in Saudi Arabia. His remains were repatriated to Tunisia on April 6, 1968.
