= Taqi al-Din al-Hilali =

Moroccan Islamic scholar

Personal life
- Born: 1893 Rissani, Morocco
- Died: June 22, 1987 (aged 93–94) Casablanca, Morocco
- Era: Modern era
- Region: North Africa

Religious life
- Religion: Islam
- Denomination: Sunni
- Creed: Athari
- Movement: Salafism

Muslim leader
- Influenced by: Dawud al-Zahiri, Ibn Hazm
- Influenced: Muhammad Abu Khubza

Muhammad Taqi al-Din bin Abd al-Qadir al-Hilali (Arabic: محمد تقي الدين الهلالي, romanized: Muḥammad Taqī al-Dīn al-Hilālī; 1893 – June 22, 1987) was a 20th-century Moroccan Salafi, most notable for his English translations of Sahih Bukhari and, along with Muhammad Muhsin Khan, the Qur'an, entitled The Noble Qur'an.

== Biography ==
=== Early life and education ===
Hilali was born in Rissani, Morocco, near the oasis of Tafilalt in a valley near Sajalmasah in 1893 (1311 AH).

In his twenties, Hilali moved to Algeria in order to study Muslim Jurisprudence, moving on to Egypt in 1922. While there, Hilali enrolled in Al-Azhar University only to drop out after being disappointed with the curriculum. Instead, Hilali spent time under the tutelage of Rashid Rida, then returned to Morocco that same year to finish his Bachelor of Arts degree at the University of al-Karaouine. Responding to a call by Muslim Brotherhood founder Hassan al-Banna for Muslim intellectuals of Morocco to share ideas with those elsewhere, Hilali wrote a number of letters to the organization's magazine which were intercepted by authorities of the French colonial empire. Arrested and held for three days without charge, Hilali's release was secured and he fled Morocco. Shortly after he escaped the country, he was sentenced to death in absentia for subversive activity against the French protectorate of Morocco.

=== In Asia and Europe ===
After performing the pilgrimage to Mecca, Hilali moved to India in order to pursue Hadith studies. While there, he worked as head of Arabic studies at Darul-uloom Nadwatul Ulama in Lucknow. After completing his study in India, Hilali spent three years in Iraq before being personally invited by first King of Saudi Arabia Ibn Saud to teach in the Muslim holy land. Hilali taught and led the prayer in Medina at Al-Masjid an-Nabawi, Islam's second holiest site, for two years and taught in Mecca at Masjid al-Haram, Islam's most holy site, for one more year.

After finishing his duration of teaching in Mecca, Hilali enrolled in Baghdad University; he also served as an assistant professor while there. Hilali returned briefly to India for a second time, and enrolled in the University of Lucknow as both a student and a teacher, the most prominent of his own being Abul Hasan Ali Hasani Nadwi. Shakib Arslan, who was a close friend of Hilali, went through a contact at the German Foreign Office and helped Hilali enroll (again, both as a student and a teacher) at the University of Bonn. A disciple of Rashid Rida, the Salafi scholar and anti-colonial activist began teaching Arabic at Bonn University in 1936 and became the head of the cultural department of the Foreign Office's Islamic Central Institute, as well as a Radio Berlin broadcaster in Arabic. In 1942, Grand Mufti of Jerusalem Amin al-Husseini sent him to Morocco to organize covert operations.

=== Return to Morocco, then Iraq, then Morocco, then Saudi Arabia, then Morocco ===
Toward the end of World War II, Hilali left Germany for French Morocco, which was rocked with calls for independence. He returned to Iraq in 1947, once again taking up a teaching position at the university in Baghdad. After the 14 July Revolution, Hilali returned to a now-independent Kingdom of Morocco one more time. He was appointed to a teaching position at Mohammed V University in Rabat in 1959 and later at a branch in Fes.

In 1968, Saudi Arabian Grand Mufti Abd al-Aziz ibn Baz wrote to Hilali requesting that he take up a teaching position at Islamic University of Madinah, of which Bin Baz was the president. Hilali accepted, living in Saudi Arabia for one more time between 1968 and 1974.

In 1974, Hilali permanently retired from teaching, moving to Meknes initially and later to Casablanca, where he owned a house. Hilali died at June 22, 1987 (25th of Shawal in the year 1408 AH). He was buried in the neighborhood of Sbata.

== Reception ==
=== Criticism ===
al-Hilali had many critics, especially among Western academics and Muslim scholars due to his translation of the Qur'an. Regarding his translation, Dr William S. Peachy, an American professor of English at College of Medicine, King Saud University at Qasseem, commented: "Nobody likes it except the Saudis who don’t know English, whose native language is not English." He also said: "It’s repulsive."

Dr AbdulHalim, Arabic Professor at SOAS University of London, noted that he found the Hilali-Khan translation "repelling". The Director of King Fahd International Centre for Translation, King Saud University, Riyad, Dr. A. Al-Muhandis, expressed his dissatisfaction with the translation’s style and language, being too poor and simplistic.

Khaleel Mohammed has taken the translation to task for:

"[reading] more like a supremacist Muslim, anti-Semitic, anti-Christian polemic than a rendition of the Islamic scripture."

Sheila Musaji complains that it:

"is shocking in its distortions of the message of the Qur’an and amounts to a rewrite not a translation."

Robert (Farooq) D. Crane states that it is:

"Perhaps the most extremist translation ever made of the Qur’an."

Khaled Abou El Fadl attacks what he calls "grotesque misogyny" in the translation.

Imad-ad-Dean Ahmad, head of Bethesda's Minaret of Freedom Institute, an Islamic think tank stated that:

"I couldn't find an American Muslim who had anything good to say about that edition. I would call it a Wahhabi Koran."

According to Mobeen Vaid:

The Hilali-Khan translation suffers from egregious errors and interpolations, advancing a particular orientation of Islam directly within the translation itself. Wherein prior translators largely constrained their efforts to translating the texts and footnoting their biases, Hilali-Khan elected to interpose those biases directly into the translated words, making the distinction between God's words and their own quite difficult. Translations such as, And Our angels are nearer to him than you, but you do not see, to verse Q 56.85 are indeed problematic. In the verse, the pronoun naḥnu (we) is translated as “Our angels”, in direct contrast with the literal meaning of the term.

== Works ==
al-Hilali worked with Muhammad Muhsin Khan in the English translation of the meanings of the Qur'an and Sahih al-Bukhari. Their translation of the Qur'an has been described as ambitious, incorporating commentary from Tafsir al-Tabari, Tafsir ibn Kathir, Tafsir al-Qurtubi and Sahih al-Bukhari. It has also been criticized for inserting the interpretations of the Salafi school directly into the English rendition of the Qur'an. It has been accused of inculcating Muslims and potential Muslims with militant interpretations of Islam through parenthesis, as teachings of the Qur'an itself.

== Personal life ==
al-Hilali was an adherent of the Zahiri school of Islamic law according to his children and students. Administrators of his website edited his biography to remove all references to his adherence to the school, which modern-day Zahiris took issue.

== See also ==
- Muhammad bin Jamil Zeno
- Muhammad Muhsin Khan
- Saleh al-Fawzan
- Abd Al-Aziz Fawzan Al-Fawzan
