= Muhammad Muhsin Khan =

Muslim scholar and author (1927–2021)

Muhammad Muhsin Khan محمد محسن خان

Personal life
- Born: 1927 Kasur, British India (present-day Pakistan)
- Died: 14 July 2021 (aged 93–94) Madinah, Saudi Arabia
- Notable works: Noble Qur'an; The Translation of the Meanings of Sahih al-Bukhari
- Education: University of the Punjab; University of Wales

Religious life
- Religion: Islam

Muhammad Muhsin Khan (Pashto/Dari/Arabic: محمد محسن خان ; 1927 – 14 July 2021) was an Islamic scholar and translator of Afghan origin, who lived in Madinah and served as the Chief of Department of Chest Diseases at the King Faisal Specialist Hospital and Research Center. He translated both the Quran and Sahih al-Bukhari into English. He was the director of the clinic of Islamic University of Madinah.

== Biography ==
Muhammad Muhsin Khan was born in 1927 in Kasur, British India. His nasab (patronymic) is: Muhammad Muhsin bin Muhi-ud-Din bin Ahmed al-Essa al-Khoashki al-Jamandi al-Afghani. His grandparents emigrated from Afghanistan in order to escape from war and tribal strifes. He belongs to the Kheshgi Pashtun tribe (arabized as Al-Khoashki) that resides in the valley of Arghistan, Kandahar Province Afghanistan, where he completed most of his education.

He received an MBBS degree from the University of the Punjab, and a Diploma of Chest Diseases from the University of Wales. Prior to his studies at the University of Wales, he worked in the university hospital of the University of Lahore. He later worked with Saudi Arabia's Ministry of Health, and then became the director of El-Sadad Hospital for the Chest Diseases. He moved to Madinah, where he served as the Chief of Department of Chest Diseases at the King Faisal Specialist Hospital and Research Center. He later became the director of the clinic of the Islamic University of Madinah.

Muhsin Khan died on 14 July 2021 in Madinah, Saudi Arabia. His funeral prayers were offered in Masjid al-Haram and he was buried in Jannat al-Baqi'.

== Works ==
- The Translation of the Meanings of Sahih al-Bukhari
- Summarized Sahih al-Bukhari
- Noble Qur'an, co-authored with Muhammad Taqi ad-Din al-Hilali
- Understanding Ramadan

== See also ==
- Muhammad bin Jamil Zeno
- Saleh Al-Fawzan
