= Muhammad bin Jamil Zeno =

Islamic scholar (1925 - 2010)

Muhammad bin Jamil Zeno (Arabic: محمد بن جمیل زینو; 1925 – October 8, 2010) was an imam, teacher, scholar and an author.

== Name ==
His name has also been transliterated differently in the English speaking world. Whilst his publishers Dar-Us-Salam in Riyadh translate it as 'Muhammad bin Jamil Zeno', it is also rendered as Muhammad Bin/Ibn Jamal/Jamaal/Jameel Zeeno/Zaino/Zayno/Zeeenu/Zeenoo/Zino/Zainu.

== Early life ==
Zeno was born in Aleppo, Syria in 1925. At the age of 10 he attended a boarding school for 5 years, during which he became a Hafiz.

He then went on to study forensic science at the University of Aleppo, which was part of the Islamic Waqf. He became a Sheikh and joined the House of Teachers in Aleppo where he taught for 29 years before leaving to teach in a madrasah in the Grand Mosque in Mecca. Later he traveled to Jordan to give Dawah where he became an Imam, teacher and influential preacher.

In 1979/1980, he went onto teach in Dar-ul-Hadith al-khairiyah in Mecca, Saudi Arabia where he was a teacher for many years.

== Controversy ==
Zeno (as Zainu) features heavily in the 2005 report 'Saudi Publications On Hate Ideology Invade American Mosques', by Freedom House, the New York-based human rights organization.

Zeno's book, ‘Islamic Guidelines for Individual and Social Reform’, featured in the 2007 PBS Frontline documentary Homegrown: Islam In Prison, which was part of the America at a Crossroads television series. The documentary states that his books were distributed to prisons by the controversial Al-Haramain Islamic Foundation.

Zeno featured heavily a study by the neoconservative Centre for Social Cohesion, 'Hate on the State: How British libraries encourage Islamic extremism' by James Brandon and Douglas Murray, in which he has been described as "One of the most virulent Wahhabi clerics whose books are stocked in the Tower Hamlets libraries." which BBC News also reported on.

Zeno was also criticised for writing that "Singing is a prelude to adultery…handclapping and whistling are abominable acts which one should abandon" and "Dolls made in foreign countries should not be bought and given to children. Why should we support the finance of…Jewish exporters?"

== See also ==
- Abd Al-Aziz Fawzan Al-Fawzan
- Muhammad Taqi-ud-Din al-Hilali
- Muhammad Muhsin Khan
- Saleh Al-Fawzan
- List of Muslim educational institutions
