= Haroon al-Afghani =

Afghan-Pakistani citizen (born 1980)

Asadullah Haroon Gul
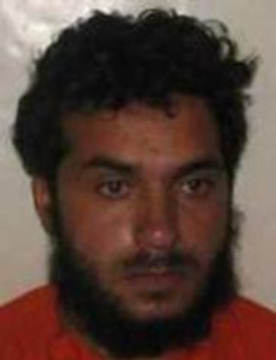
- A portrait of Haroon gul
- Born: 1981 (age 44–45); Sherzad District, Nangarhar Province, Afghanistan
- Arrested: 4 February 2007; Jalalabad, Afghanistan; National Directorate of Security
- Citizenship: Pakistan
- Detained at: Guantanamo
- Other name: Haroon al-Afghani
- ISN: 3148
- Charge: None
- Status: Released
- Occupation: Trader of household goods
- Spouse: Unknown wife
- Children: Unknown daughter

Asadullah Haroon Gul (Pashto: هارون الافغاني; born 1981), commonly referred to as Haroon al-Afghani ("the Afghani"), is an Afghan citizen who was held in extrajudicial detention in the United States Guantanamo Bay detention camps, in Cuba.

Haroon al-Afghani was transferred to the Guantanamo detention camps on June 22, 2007, and was held there for 15 years. On June 22, 2007, the United States Department of Defense acknowledged transferring Haroon al-Afghani to Guantanamo. Prior to 2016, almost nothing certain was known about his background and activities. He had been held for more than eight years without being charged (leading to Al Jazeera naming him a "forever prisoner") before he was allowed legal representation, which was successfully pleaded for by Reprieve US.

The DoD detained him on the claim that he was an Al-Qaeda courier and senior commander of Hezb-e-Islami/Gulbuddin (HiG) who allegedly commanded multiple HiG terrorist cells, conducted IED (improvised explosive device) attacks in Nangarhar province, and had regular contact with senior Al-Qaeda and HiG leadership. The argument for his detention was that he might have had additional information with respect to ongoing Al-Qaeda operations that could help thwart future attacks.

However, relatives, who were unaware of his location following his sudden abduction, rejected the story and stated that the accusations were baseless. Reprieve US and his lawyer believe that, as supported by an Al Jazeera study, Al-Afghani is a victim of mistaken identity, and "has never been a member of the Taliban or al Qaeda, has never caused nor attempted to cause harm to American personnel or property and has never espoused violent beliefs."

According to Jeffrey Kaye he feared other captives would regard him as an American spy.

== Joint Review Task Force ==
On January 21, 2009, the day he was inaugurated, United States President Barack Obama issued three Executive orders related to the detention of individuals in Guantanamo. He put in place a new review system composed of officials from six departments, where the OARDEC reviews were conducted entirely by the Department of Defense. When it reported back, a year later, the Joint Review Task Force classified some individuals as too dangerous to be transferred from Guantanamo, even though there was no evidence to justify laying charges against them. On April 9, 2013, that document was made public after a Freedom of Information Act request. Haroon al-Afghani was one of the 71 individuals deemed too innocent to charge, but too dangerous to release. Obama said those deemed too innocent to charge, but too dangerous to release would start to receive reviews from a Periodic Review Board.

== Periodic Review Board ==
The first review was not convened until November 20, 2013. Haroon was approved for transfer on October 7, 2021.

== Al Jazeera profile ==
The Al Jazeera news service profiled al-Afghani on January 20, 2016, describing him as an individual about whom "almost nothing certain is known". They identified him as a "forever prisoner"—one of those the 2009 Guantanamo Review Task Force concluded was too dangerous to release—even though he was not charged with any crime.

It is believed that Afghani was born around 1981 and is from the Sherzad district in Nangarhar province in Afghanistan. "He was just a normal young boy", his relative said according to a report by Al Jazeera. Afghani was a student when the Taliban was in power. He studied economics at Hayatabad Science University in Peshawar, Pakistan.

== Profile in Afghanistan ==
The human rights group Reprieve has tried to make Haroon a household name, in Afghanistan, to generate public pressure for his release. According to founder Clive Stafford Smith “With ordinary Afghans on his side it may bring the pressure we need at a time when the Americans are involved in peace talks with the Taliban.”

Stafford Smith noted that Haroon has yet to have had a visit from Afghan officials.

== Release ==
Haroon was released on June 24, 2022.

== Life post-release ==
Haroon has spoken out about the treatment of Palestinian prisoners in Israeli detention, comparing it to his time in Guantanamo.
