= Noble Quran (Hilali–Khan) =

English translation of the Quran

- Author: Muhammad Muhsin Khan and Muhammad Taqi-ud-Din al-Hilali
- Publisher: King Fahd Complex for the Printing of the Holy Quran
- Publication place: Saudi Arabia
- Versions: Noble Quran, Interpretation of the meanings of the Noble Quran, The Noble Quran - English translations meanings and commentary, Complete interpretation of the meaning of the Noble Quran.

The Noble Qur'an is a translation of the Quran by Muhammad Muhsin Khan and Muhammad Taqi-ud-Din al-Hilali. It is available in many languages and is "widely and freely distributed to hajj pilgrims". It is published and printed at the King Fahd Complex for the Printing of the Holy Quran, which is said to produce ten million copies of the Quran every year.

The Hilali–Khan, Noble Quran has been given a seal of approval from both the University of Medina and the Saudi Dar al-Ifta. It is also the most widely disseminated Quran in most Islamic bookstores and Sunni mosques throughout the English-speaking world. It is available in Airport musallahs. This translation is interspersed with commentaries from Tabari, Qurtubi, and Ibn Kathir.

== Content ==
Various Hilali–Khan versions of the Quran contain parenthetical insertions, tafsir/commentaries and appendices. The Hilali–Khan translation has been criticized for inserting the interpretations of the Wahhabi school directly into the English rendition of the Quran. Many readers will not realise this content does not form part of the original Quran wording. The translation has been accused of inculcating Muslims and potential Muslims with militant interpretations of Islam through parenthetical comments and additions as teachings of the Quran itself.

== Criticism ==
Dr. Ahmed Farouk Musa, an academic at Monash University, considered the Hilali–Khan translation as being a major cause of extremism and a work distributed by Saudi religious authorities. Similarly, Imad-ad-Dean Ahmad, head of Bethesda's Minaret of Freedom Institute, has claimed. This translation is According to Ahle sunnat point of view.

A number of academics have also criticized the Hilali–Khan translation on stylistic and linguistic grounds. Dr William S. Peachy, an American professor of English at College of Medicine, King Saud University at Qasseem considered the translation "repulsive" and rejected by anyone outside of Saudi Arabia. Dr. Abdel-Haleem, Arabic Professor at SOAS, London University, noted that he found the Hilali–Khan translation "repelling".

The Director of King Fahd International Centre for Translation, King Saud University, Riyad, Dr. A. Al-Muhandis, expressed his dissatisfaction with the translation's style and language, because this translation is simple .

The Hilali–Khan translation has also been criticised by Western academics; Robert Crane, Mark Durie, Khaled Abou El Fadl, Khaleel Mohammed, and Sheila Musaji have criticized the translation for supposed Muslim supremacism and bigotry.

However, Dr Fathul Bari Mat Jahaya says the translation does not promote hostility towards other religions, with the references to Jews and Christians intended to distinguish between the beliefs of Muslims and the other two communities.

== Comparisons with other translations ==
The Sahih International translation of Al Fatihah Verse 1:7:

1:7 "Guide us to the straight path, the path of those upon whom You have bestowed favour, not of those who have evoked (Your) anger or of those who are astray."

The Hilali–Khan translation of Al Fatihah Verse 1:7:

1:7 "The Way of those on whom You have bestowed Your Grace, not (the way) of those who earned Your Anger (such as the Jews), nor of those who went astray (such as the Christians)"

Khaleel Mohammed says, "What is particularly egregious about this interpolation is that it is followed by an extremely long footnote to justify its hate based on traditions from medieval texts".

The Sahih International translation Al-Baqarah Verse 2:190:

2:190 "Fight in the way of Allah those who fight you but do not transgress. Indeed. Allah does not like transgressors."

The Hilali–Khan translation, including its parenthetical comments and additions, of Al-Baqarah Verse 2:190:

2:190 "And fight in the Way of Allah those who fight you, but transgress not the limits. Truly, Allah likes not the transgressors. [This Verse is the first one that was revealed in connection with Jihad, but it was supplemented by another (V. 9:36)]."

Sheila Musaji says, "the HK translation seriously distorts the concept of jihad."

The Sahih International translation Al-Ma'idah Verse 5:21:

5:21 "O my people, enter the Holy Land which Allah has assigned to you and do not turn back [from fighting in Allah 's cause] and [thus] become losers."

The Hilali–Khan translation of Al-Ma'idah Verse 5:21:

5:21 "O my people! Enter the holy land (Palestine) which Allah has assigned to you, and turn not back (in flight) for then you will be returned as losers"

Khaleel Mohammed says, "This Saudi version twists the verse with modern politics, writing, "O my people! Enter the holy land (Palestine)."

== See also ==
- English translations of the Quran
- List of translations of the Quran
- Quran translations
- Saudi Arabian textbook controversy
