= Mohammed Al Afghani (CIA detainee) =

CIA detainee

- Arrested: May 2004; Peshawar, Pakistan; Pakistani security officials
- Citizenship: Afghanistan
- Status: Was held in extrajudicial detention in CIA custody, current location unknown

Mohammed Al Afghani is a citizen of Afghanistan, held by the United States in the CIA's network of black sites.

== Background ==
Amnesty International reports he was born in Saudi Arabia; that he was captured in Peshawar, Pakistan, in May 2004; that he was transferred from Pakistani custody on June 15, 2004, to CIA custody with three other men, including Marwan Jabour.

== Disappearance ==
On April 22, 2009 Propublica published a list of CIA captives and its estimate of their current status. The location and status of most of the individuals on that list were described simply as "unknown". They estimated that Mohammed Al Afghani had been transferred to the Guantanamo Bay detention camp. The Department of Defense has acknowledged holding an individual they named as "Muhammad Rahim al Afghani"—but they said he was captured in Lahore, Pakistan in 2007.

== See also ==
- List of people who disappeared mysteriously: post-1970
