= Confédération générale des travailleurs tunisiens =

Confédération générale des travailleurs tunisiens ('General Confederation of Tunisian Workers', abbreviated CGTT) was a central trade union organisation in Tunisia. Founded in 1924, it was the first Tunisian trade union central. However, the French colonial authorities soon clamped down on the organization. Several of its leaders were arrested. Six of them, including Mohamed Ali El Hammi, were put on trial in November 1925 and deported from the country. Soon thereafter, CGTT was dissolved.
