= Abu Yasir Al Jaza'iri =

Al-Qaeda member

Abu Yasir Al Jaza'iri is an alleged terrorist, captured as part of the war on terror in Lahore on March 15, 2003, along with a Pakistani and three unnamed Afghans. His capture was attributed to information from the interrogation of Khalid Sheikh Mohammed, who was captured a few weeks earlier. He was described as the seventh most important al Qaeda member. Initial press reports stated that FBI agents participated in the capture, but Pakistan's Information Minister disputed this, asserting the capture was solely the work of local officials.

== Role in al Qaeda ==
MSNBC identified "Abu Yasir al Jaziri" as traveling as part of the entourage of Khalid Sheikh Mohammed, al Qaeda's third in command. MSNBC reported that he is an Algerian or Moroccan. MSNBC reported that he is either an al Qaeda security official or financial official.

The Sunday Mirror described him as "Osama's moneyman" and a "computer whiz", who was captured with two laptops.

== Guantanamo connections ==
The Summary of Evidence memo prepared for Guantanamo captive Ali Abdullah Ahmed's Combatant Status Review Tribunal on 1 November 2004, and the Summary of Evidence memo prepared for his first annual Administrative Review Board, on 26 May 2005 alleged:

- "Senior Al Qaida facilitator Abu Yasir Al Jaza'iri identified the detainee."

The memo prepared for his second Administrative Review Board, on 8 March 2006 listed the following factor favoring Ali Abdullah Ahmed's release or transfer:

The detainee denied ever knowing Abu Yasir or Abu Zabayda [sic]. The detainee denied ever being in Kandahar, Afghanistan. The detainee stated he went to Pakistan to study the Koran and was not involved with the Taliban or al Qaida. The detainee said he was innocent. The detainee denied ever having stayed at the Abu Suhaib.

Ali Abdullah Ahmed is one of the three Guantanamo captives who was reported to have committed suicide on June 10, 2006.

When the United States Senate Intelligence Committee released an unclassified summary of its 6,000-page report on the CIA's use of torture some journalists concluded al Jaza'iri was one of the last individuals to be held in the CIA's network of secret torture camps.
