= Muhammad Rahim al Afghani =

Afghan detainee in Guantanamo

Muhammad Rahim al Afghani محمد رحیم الافغانی
- Born: November or December 1965; Nangarhar, Afghanistan
- Arrested: June 2007; Lahore, Pakistan; Pakistani security officials
- Detained at: Guantanamo
- ISN: 10029
- Charge: No charge
- Status: Still held in Guantanamo

Muhammad Rahim (born 1965) is an Afghan national who is held in captivity by the United States Government at Guantanamo Bay. He was born in eastern Afghanistan. Muhammad Rahim worked for an Afghan government committee that worked to eliminate opium poppies from the nation. He was forced to leave his job by the Taliban. In 1979, Rahim fled Afghanistan with his brother over the border of Pakistan. Their departure was triggered by the Soviet Union invasion into Afghanistan.

In 2007, The Nation reported that Rahim and Sheikh Ilyas Khel had been apprehended by Pakistani security officials. The Nation described him as "Osama bin Laden's special aide", and asserted he had negotiated with Hazrat Ali in early 2002.

Pakistan turned Rahim over to the U.S. Central Intelligence Agency (CIA) for interrogation regarding Rahim's interactions with the Taliban. In CIA custody, Rahim was subjected to long periods of sleep deprivation and other methods of torture as part of the Rendition, Detention and Interrogation (RDI) Program. He was the last known person to be admitted subject to the CIA's RDI program.

After several months of CIA interrogations and torture, however, Rahim, in March 2008, was sent to Guantanamo Bay, Cuba where he is held in extrajudicial detention. Described as a "tough, seasoned jihadist" by the head of the CIA, Rahim was accused of helping Osama bin Laden escape capture as well as working as bin Laden's translator and assistant. Rahim is the last prisoner to have been sent to Guantanamo. Despite his seventeen years in Guantanamo, no charges have been made against Muhammad Rahim. The US military has stated that it has no intention of trying him in a military commission. The United States government, through the Periodic Review Secretariat, announced that it does not intend to recommend his release. Accordingly, he is a "forever prisoner." He is reportedly not a possible candidate for an exchange peace deal. The United States Department of Defense announced he had been transferred to military custody on 14 March 2008. According to Agence France-Presse:

Rahim is the 16th so-called "high value" prisoner to be transferred to Guantanamo since September 2006 when President George W. Bush acknowledged the existence of secret CIA detention facilities overseas.

The New York Times reported that he was the first captive to be transferred from CIA custody in close to a year. He was captured in Lahore, Pakistan, in June 2007, and tortured by the CIA as part of the Rendition Detention and Interrogation Program until his transfer to Guantanamo on or about 28 March 2008.

According to the official press release announcing his transfer to Guantanamo he had been held in the CIA's network of secret interrogation centers prior to his transfer to Guantanamo. The Pentagon classified him as a high value detainee, an appellation he shared with the 14 captives transferred from the CIA on 6 September 2006, and with Abdul Hadi al Iraqi. That press release stated:

Muhammad Rahim al-Afghani was a close associate of Usama bin Ladin and had ties to al-Qaida organizations throughout the Middle East. He became one of bin Ladin's most trusted facilitators and procurement specialists prior to his detention.

Muhammad Rahim al-Afghani's Guantanamo detainee assessment

While in Guantanamo Bay, Muhammad Rahim is being detained in Camp 7, a place for men who are deemed "'high value' detainees by the US Government." While in custody in Guantanamo, Rahim has yet to have charges filed against him or have a court appearance to defend himself and present his case. In late November 2008, the New York Times published a database summarizing the official documents from each captive. The New York Times stated that no further official records of his detention—no Combatant Status Review Tribunal had been published. They identified him as identified captive 10030, a "high value detainee".

In 2002, the BBC reported that an individual named "Mohammed Rahim" was one of the Taliban senior leader Mohammed Omar's drivers. According to the BBC, in an interview with Reuters in January 2002, Rahim described how the Taliban's senior leader escaped two American missile strikes.

In his interview, Rahim said that when Mohammed Omar's home in Kandahar was hit by a missile strike he engaged him to drive his taxi, containing Mohammed Omar, his second wife, and several of his children to Sangisar, an hour away. Almost immediately after their arrival, and exit from his taxi, it too was struck by a missile. The missile struck the taxi, nothing else in the village was targeted. Mohammed Rahim said he fled one way, and Mohammed Omar fled another, and that this was his last contact with him.

Rahim's former lawyer, Carlos Warner of Akron, Ohio, described how even when meeting with his client, Rahim is still shackled. Warner filed a civil writ of habeas corpus seeking Rahim's release because of the lack of charges against his client after five years of detention.

In October 2025, it was reported that the Taliban were negotiating the release of Muhammad Rahim as part of a deal involving the release of Americans detained in Afghanistan.

== Reports of "extended interrogation techniques" ==
In August 2009, formerly classified documents about the CIA's use of torture were made public when the judicial branch upheld Freedom of Information Act requests.

On 27 August 2009, Pamela Hess and Devlin Barrett, of the Associated Press, reported that in late 2007 the CIA subjected a captive was chained to the floors and walls of his cell, and subjected to extended sleep deprivation. They noted while the captive's name was withheld Al-Afghani was the only captive known to have been in CIA custody at the time of the use of these techniques. They noted that the Bush Presidency had publicly abandoned the use of these techniques, but an exception was made because government lawyers had given the CIA permission. The captive had his hands chained above the level of his heart.
