= El Ahmadi Mosque =

Mosque in Tunis, Tunisia

- جامع الأحمدي
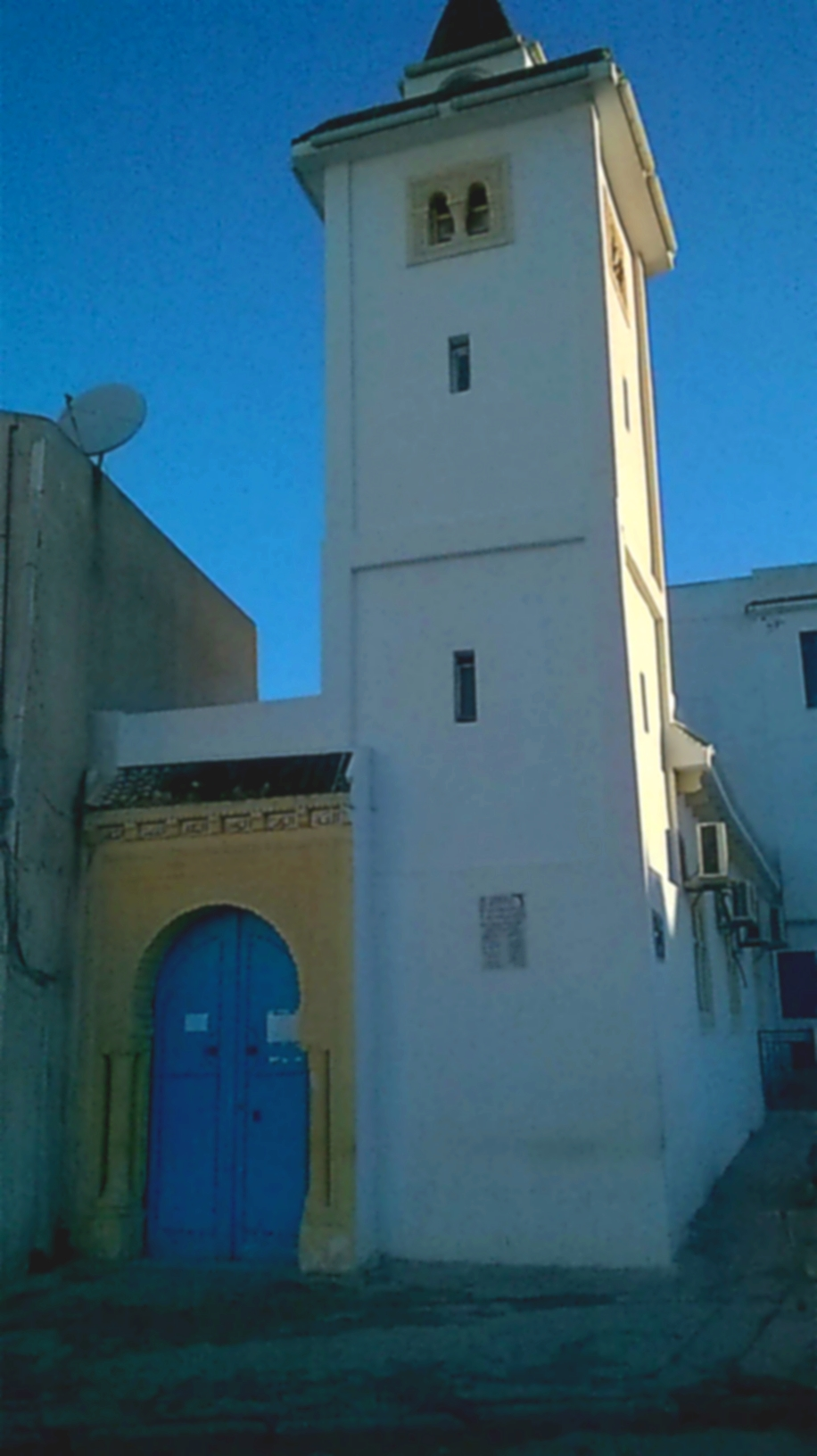

- Location within Tunisia

Religion
- Affiliation: Islam
- Branch/tradition: Sunni

Location
- Location: Tunis, Tunisia
- Interactive map of El Ahmadi Mosque
- Coordinates: 36.809523°N 10.172284°E

Architecture
- Type: Mosque

El Ahmadi Mosque (Arabic: جامع الأحمدي) is a small mosque in the northern suburb of the Medina of Tunis near Bab El Khadra one of its gates.

== Localization ==
The mosque can be found in the Bab El Khadra street.

== History ==
According to the commemorative plaque at the entrance of the mosque, it was built in 1933. In the same plaque, a poem by Ahmed Ben Salah Al Karoui is written too. The poem praises Ahmad II of Tunis the founder of the mosque.

== Etymology ==
The mosque got its name from its founder Ahmad II of Tunis, one of the beys of Tunis who ruled from 1929 until his death.

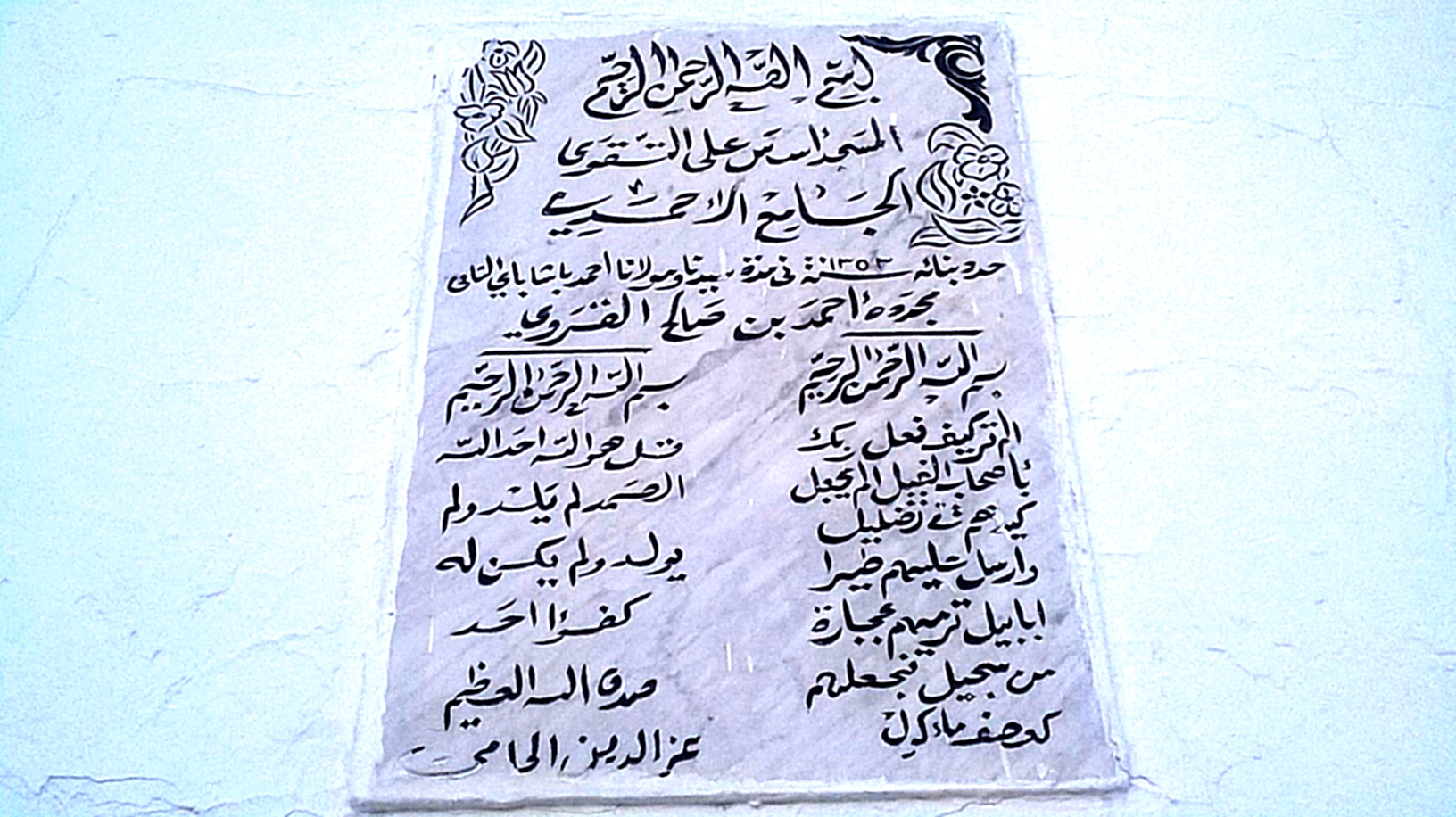
Commemorative plaque of the mosque

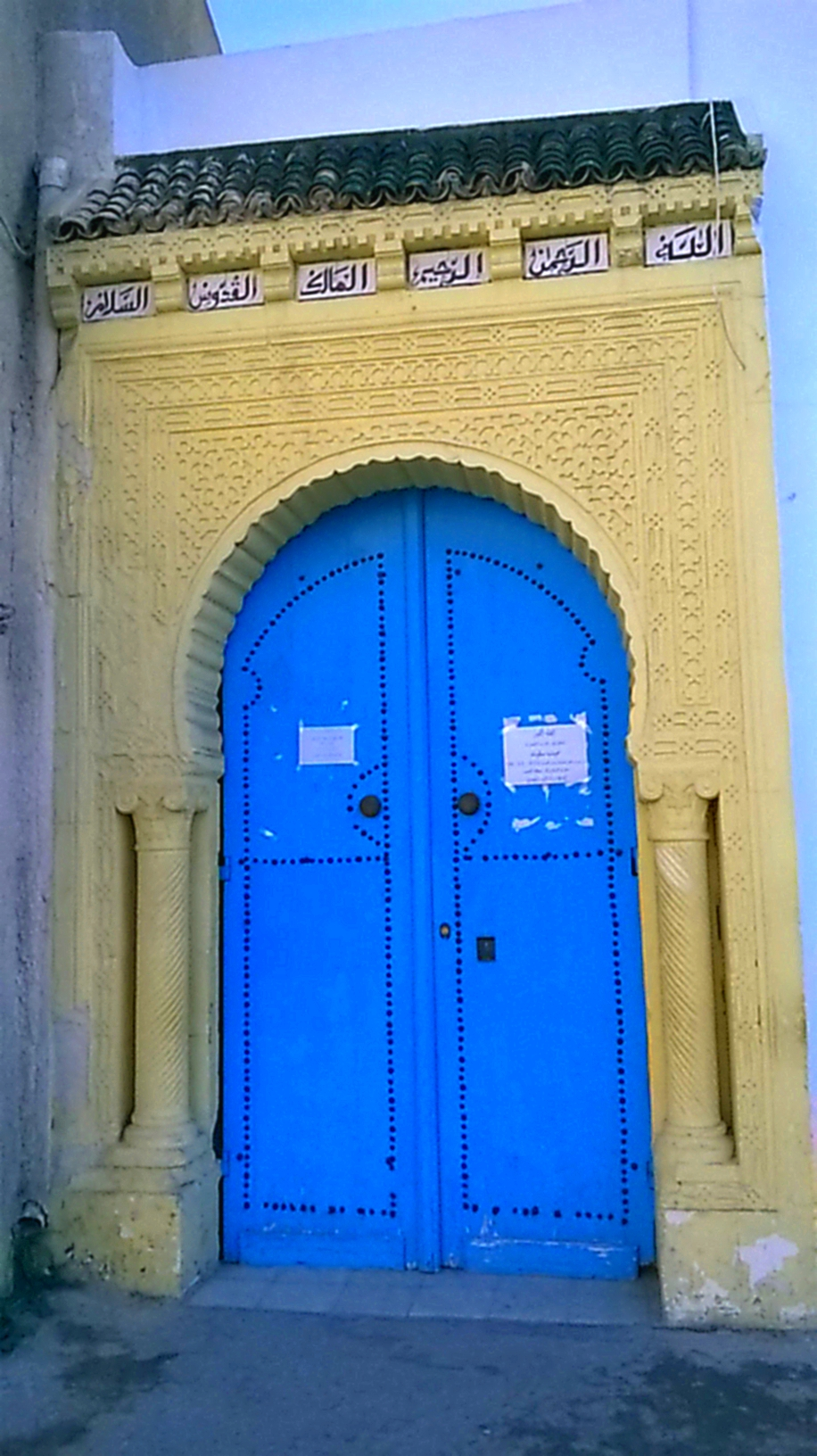
Entrance of the mosque

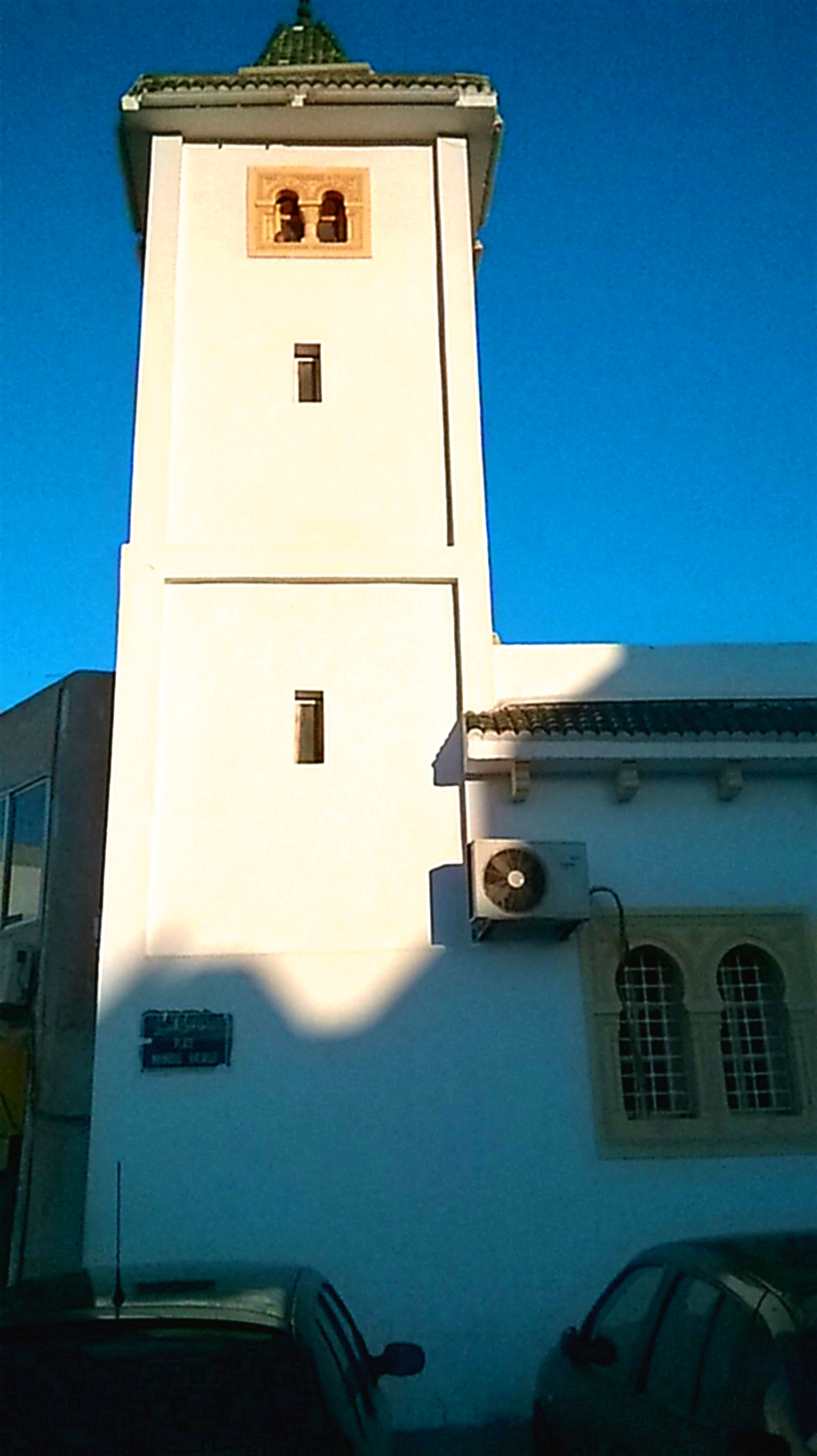
Minaret of the mosque
