= Air Force Operation Command =

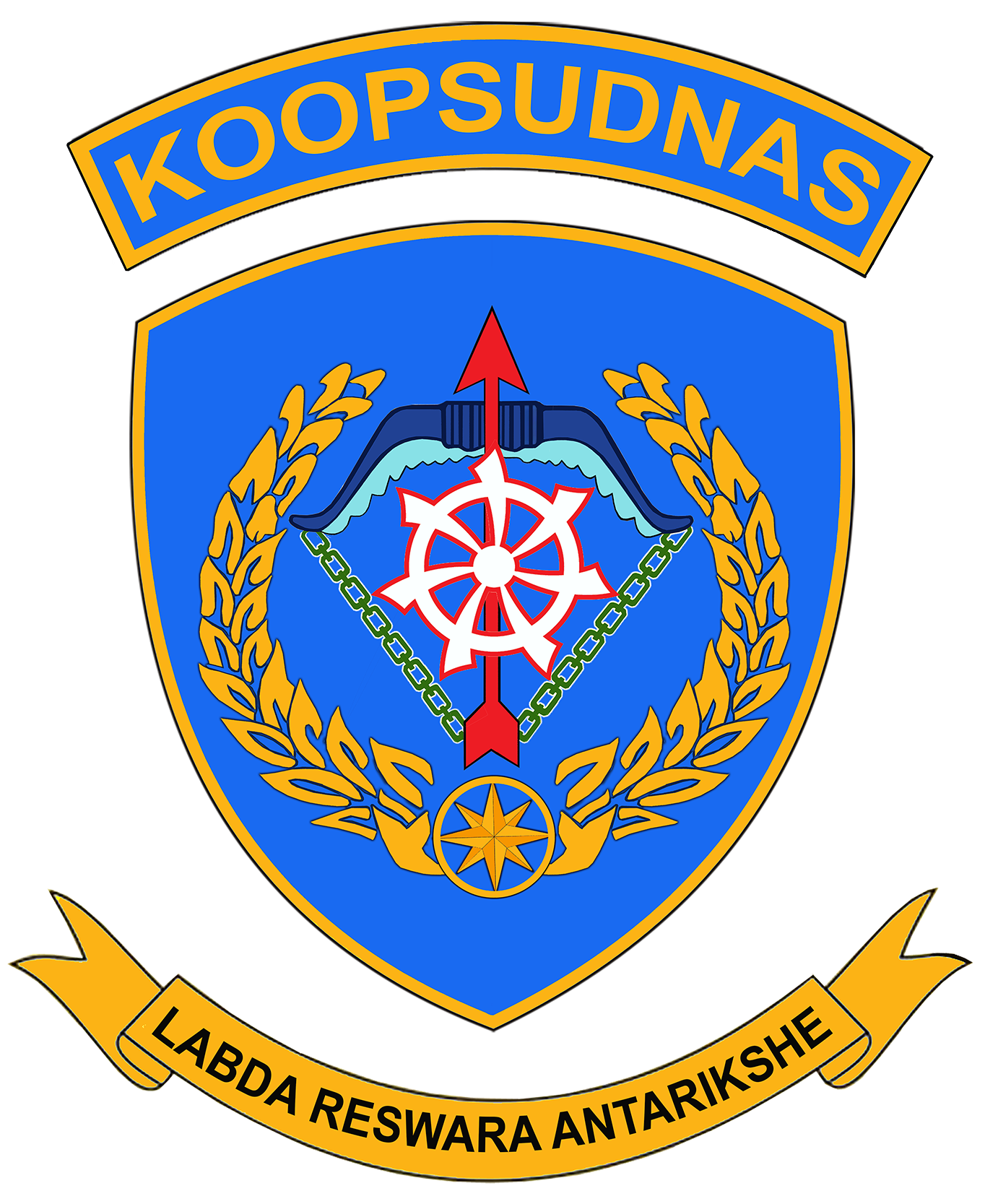
Air Force Operation Command
- Komando Operasi Angkatan Udara
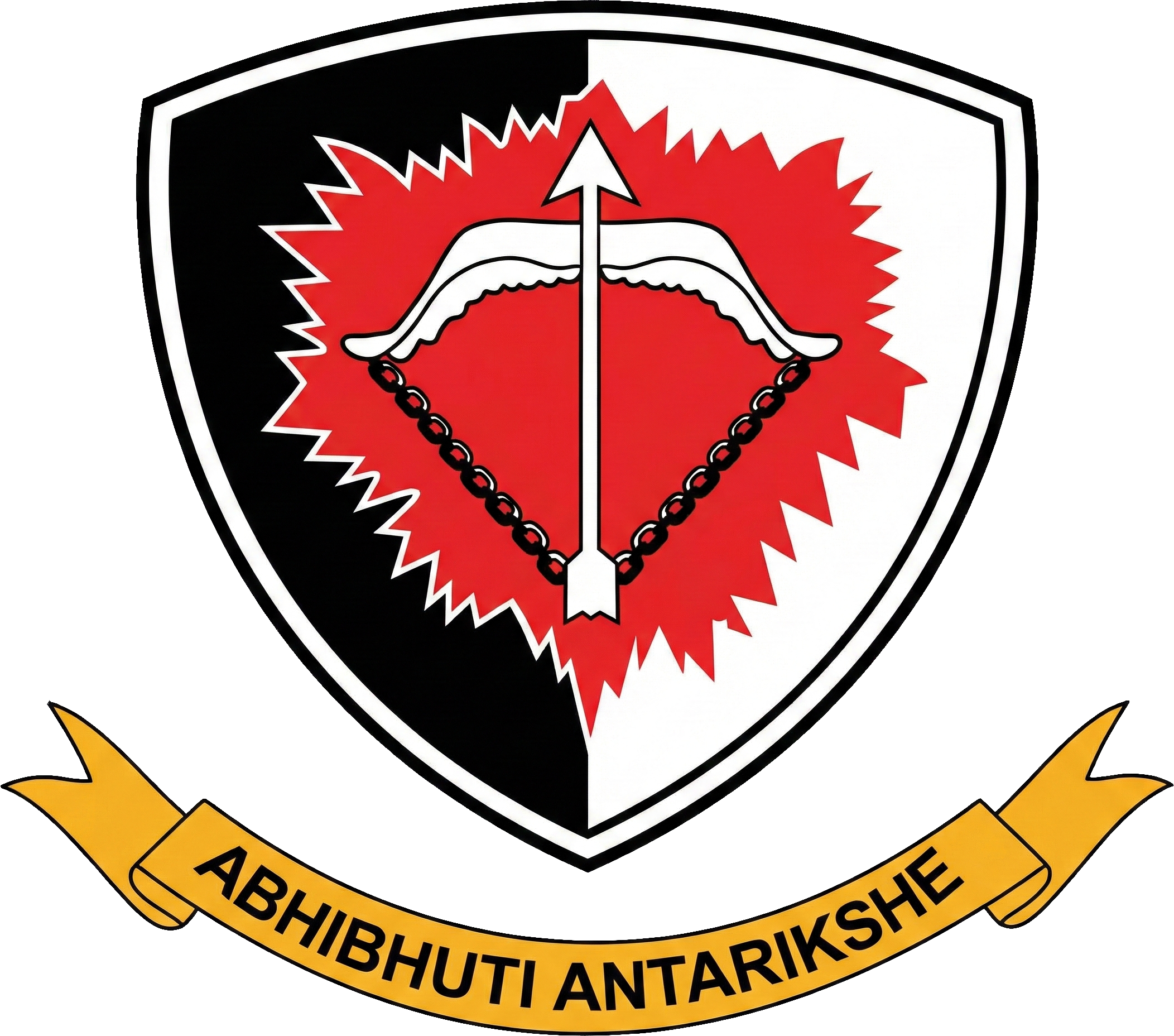
- Badge of Koopsau
- Active: 15 June 1951 as Group Operasional; 5 August 2025 as its current form
- Country: Indonesia
- Branch: Indonesian Air Force
- Type: Air Supremacy Command
- Role: Early-Warning Radar; Air Supremacy; Air Mobility; Air Strike
- Part of: National Air Operation Command
- Mottos: Abhibhuti Antarikshe transl. 'We are superior in the Sky'
- Website: https://www.instagram.com/koopsau_news/

Commanders
- Commander: Air Vice Marshall Djoko Hadipurwanto
- Chief of Staff: Air Commodore Destianto Nugroho Utomo
- Inspector: Air Commodore Dedy Ilham Suryanto Salam
- Head of Expert Staff Group: Air Commodore Ridha Hermawan

The Air Force Operation Command (Indonesian: Komando Operasi Angkatan Udara, abbr. as Koopsau) is one of the commands of the Indonesian Air Force under the National Air Operations Command.

This command is tasked with developing the capabilities and operational readiness of Indonesian Air Force units within its ranks, and conducting air operations to uphold national sovereignty in the air, supporting the enforcement of national sovereignty on land and at sea.

Prior to 1999, the Sector Command was under the National Air Defense Command, and starting on 12 September 2025, the Sector Command was under the Air Force Operation Command. The Sector Command's duties and functions are to control and conduct air defense operations within its geographic area, which is part of the Indonesian Air Force's National Air Operations Command (Koopsudnas) and is under the Air Force Operation Command (Koopsau). Its functions include developing capabilities, operational readiness, and conducting surveillance and air defense operations within its area of responsibility.

Radar Units were each assigned to four Sector Commands:

1. Sector Command I in Medan
2. Sector Command II in Makassar
3. Sector Command III in Biak Numfor
4. Sector Command IV in Jakarta

Air Wings were each assigned to four Groups:

1. Group I Transport
2. Group II Helicopter
3. Group III Combat
4. Group IV Special

== History ==
The nucleus of the command was the Operational Group, which was formed on 15 June 1951, based on a decree from the Chief of Staff of the Air Force. It was formed through the merger of five operational squadrons to form an operational group.

On 27 July 1954, its name was changed to the Composition Group Command (Komando Group Komposisi / KGK), which remained in effect until 5 October 1959. It was then renamed the Air Force Operation Command until 21 June 1976. After that, its name was changed again to the Air Combat Forces Command (Komando Pasukan Tempur Udara / Kopatdara) until 10 May 1985.

On 10 May 1985, in accordance with the reorganization of the Indonesian Armed Forces (ABRI), Kopatdara was renamed again to the Indonesian Air Force Operation Command (Koopsau), as it is known today.

On 10 August 2025, Indonesian President Prabowo Subianto inaugurated the formation of a number of new units, including Kohanudnas, three Air Force Regional Commands (Kodau), one Air Force Operation Command (Koopsau), one Korpasgat regiment, and five Korpasgat battalions as well as a number of new units within the Indonesian Army and Indonesian Navy.

History of changes in the unit name.

- 21 Mar 1951 – 15 Jun 1951 as Operational Group (Group Operasional).
- 15 Jun 1951 – 27 Jun 1954 as Operation Command (Komando Operasi).
- 27 Jun 1954 – 05 Oct 1959 as Composite Group Command (Komando Group Komposisi) abbr. as KGK.
- 05 Oct 1959 – 21 Jun 1976 as Air Force Operation Command (Komando Operasi Angkatan Udara) abbr. as Koopsau.
- 21 Jun 1976 – 10 May 1985 as Air Combat Integrated Command (Komando Paduan Tempur Udara) abbr. as Kopatdara.
- 10 May 1985 – 21 Jan 2022 as Air Force Operation Command (Komando Operasi TNI Angkatan Udara) abbr. as Koopsau.
- 21 Jan 2022 – 05 Aug 2025 as Air Operation Command (Komando Operasi Udara) abbr. as Koopsud.
- 05 Aug 2025 – Present. Split into two as Air Force Regional Command (Komando Daerah Angkatan Udara) abbr. as Kodau and Air Force Operation Command (Komando Operasi TNI Angkatan Udara) abbr. as Koopsau, with Air Force Bases are under the Kodau and Air Wings, Groups, and Sector Commands under the Koopsau.

== Units ==
Based on the Decree of the Chief of Staff of the Air Force Number Kep/603/IX/2025 concerning the Organizational Restructuring of Sector Commands and their Ranking Units, it was determined that:

Air Force Operation Command
Commands		Units	
1st Sector Command (West) Medan, North Sumatra		101st Radar Unit - Sabang, Aceh; 102nd Radar Unit - Lhokseumawe, Aceh; 103rd Radar Unit - Sibolga, North Sumatra; 104th Radar Unit - Dumai, Riau; 105th Radar Unit - Bengkulu City, Bengkulu; 106th Radar Unit - Tanjung Pinang, Riau Islands; 107th Radar Unit - Tanjung Pandan, Bangka Belitung Islands	
2nd Sector Command (North) Makassar, South Sulawesi		201st Radar Unit - Ranai, Riau Islands; 202nd Radar Unit - Singkawang, West Kalimantan; 203rd Radar Unit - Putussibau, West Kalimantan; 204th Radar Unit - Tarakan, North Kalimantan; 205th Radar Unit - Balikpapan, East Kalimantan; 206th Radar Unit - Banjarbaru, South Kalimantan; 207th Radar Unit - Kwandang, Gorontalo; 208th Radar Unit - Takalar, South Sulawesi; 209th Radar Unit - Bombana, Southeast Sulawesi	
3rd Sector Command (East) Biak, Papua		301st Radar Unit - Tanjung Warari, Biak Numfor Regency, Papua; 302nd Radar Unit - Timika, Mimika Regency, Central Papua; 303rd Radar Unit - Merauke, South Papua; 304th Radar Unit - Jayapura, Papua; 305th Radar Unit - Sorong, Southwest Papua; 306th Radar Unit - Morotai, North Maluku; 307th Radar Unit - Ambon, Maluku; 308th Radar Unit - Saumlaki, Maluku; 309th Radar Unit - Buraen, East Nusa Tenggara; 310th Radar Unit - Alor, East Nusa Tenggara	
4th Sector Command (South) Jakarta		401st Radar Unit - Tanjung Kait, Banten; 402nd Radar Unit - Cibalimbing, West Java; 403rd Radar Unit - Tegal, Central Java; 404th Radar Unit - Congot, Yogyakarta; 405th Radar Unit - Ploso, East Java; 406th Radar Unit - Ngliyep, East Java; 407th Radar Unit - Tambolaka, East Nusa Tenggara; 421st Missile Unit - Teluknaga, Banten	
Groups	Air Wings	Air Squadrons	Aircraft
1st Group (Transport Group)	11th Air Wing Halim Perdanakusuma AFB, Jakarta	2nd Air Squadron, Jakarta	CN295M; CN295 Special Mission
1st Group (Transport Group)	11th Air Wing Halim Perdanakusuma AFB, Jakarta	17th Air Squadron, Jakarta	Boeing 737; Boeing Business Jet
1st Group (Transport Group)	11th Air Wing Halim Perdanakusuma AFB, Jakarta	18th Air Squadron, Jakarta	Falcon 8X
1st Group (Transport Group)	11th Air Wing Halim Perdanakusuma AFB, Jakarta	31st Air Squadron, Jakarta	A400M MRTT; L-100-30; C-130H-30; C-130J-30
1st Group (Transport Group)	12th Air Wing Abdul Rachman Saleh AFB, Malang	4th Air Squadron, Malang	NC212-200; NC212i
1st Group (Transport Group)	12th Air Wing Abdul Rachman Saleh AFB, Malang	32nd Air Squadron, Malang	C-130B / H; KC-130B
1st Group (Transport Group)	13th Air Wing Manuhua AFB, Biak	27th Air Squadron, Biak	CN235-100M; CN235-220M; CN235-220MPA
1st Group (Transport Group)	13th Air Wing Manuhua AFB, Biak	33rd Air Squadron, Makassar	C-130H
2nd Group (Helicopter Group)	21st Air Wing Atang Sendjaja AFB, Bogor	6th Air Squadron, Bogor	NAS 332C1 / L1
2nd Group (Helicopter Group)	21st Air Wing Atang Sendjaja AFB, Bogor	8th Air Squadron, Bogor	EC725 / H225M
2nd Group (Helicopter Group)	21st Air Wing Atang Sendjaja AFB, Bogor	Search and Rescue Air Unit, Bogor	AS365 N3+; AW139; NBO 105
2nd Group (Helicopter Group)	22nd Air Wing Suryadarma AFB, Subang	7th Air Squadron, Subang	EC120B
2nd Group (Helicopter Group)	22nd Air Wing Suryadarma AFB, Subang	45th Air Squadron, Jakarta	NAS 332L1; AW101
2nd Group (Helicopter Group)	23rd Air Wing Silas Papare AFB, Jayapura	9th Air Squadron, Jayapura	
3rd Group (Combat Group)	31st Air Wing Roesmin Nurjadin AFB, Pekanbaru	1st Air Squadron, Pontianak	Hawk 109; Hawk 209
3rd Group (Combat Group)	31st Air Wing Roesmin Nurjadin AFB, Pekanbaru	12th Air Squadron, Pekanbaru	Rafale C / B F4
3rd Group (Combat Group)	31st Air Wing Roesmin Nurjadin AFB, Pekanbaru	16th Air Squadron, Pekanbaru	F-16C / D
3rd Group (Combat Group)	32nd Air Wing Iswahjudi AFB, Madiun	3rd Air Squadron, Madiun	F-16AM / BM
3rd Group (Combat Group)	32nd Air Wing Iswahjudi AFB, Madiun	14th Air Squadron, Madiun	F-16C / D
3rd Group (Combat Group)	32nd Air Wing Iswahjudi AFB, Madiun	15th Air Squadron, Madiun	T-50i
3rd Group (Combat Group)	32nd Air Wing Iswahjudi AFB, Madiun	21st Air Squadron, Malang	EMB 314
3rd Group (Combat Group)	33rd Air Wing Sultan Hasanuddin AFB, Makassar	11th Air Squadron, Makassar	Su-27SK / SKM; Su-30MK / MK2
3rd Group (Combat Group)	33rd Air Wing Sultan Hasanuddin AFB, Makassar	New Air Squadron, Kendari	
4th Group (Special Group)	41st Air Wing (UCAV) Supadio AFB, Pontianak	51st Air Squadron, Pontianak	Anka-S
4th Group (Special Group)	41st Air Wing (UCAV) Supadio AFB, Pontianak	52nd Air Squadron, Natuna	CH-4B
4th Group (Special Group)	41st Air Wing (UCAV) Supadio AFB, Pontianak	53rd Air Squadron, Tarakan	CH-4B
4th Group (Special Group)	41st Air Wing (UCAV) Supadio AFB, Pontianak	54th Air Squadron, Biak	
4th Group (Special Group)	41st Air Wing (UCAV) Supadio AFB, Pontianak	55th Air Squadron, Kupang	
4th Group (Special Group)	41st Air Wing (UCAV) Supadio AFB, Pontianak	56th Air Squadron, Madiun	
4th Group (Special Group)	42nd Air Wing (C4 ISR) Sultan Hasanuddin AFB, Makassar	5th Air Squadron, Makassar	Boeing 737-2X9 Surveiller
4th Group (Special Group)	42nd Air Wing (C4 ISR) Sultan Hasanuddin AFB, Makassar	New Air Squadron	

Italics indicate under construction and denotes planned unit but not yet activated.

Airbase based on aircraft type: Transport airbase Helicopter airbase Combat airbase Special aircraft airbase Mixed type airbase

== Commanders ==
Currently, the Air Force Operations Command is led by a Commander of the Air Force Operations Command (Pangkoopsau) with the rank of Air Vice Marshal. The current position of Pangkoopsau is held by Air Vice Marshal Djoko Hadipurwanto.
