= Indonesian Air Force Doctrine, Education and Training Development Command =

Indonesian Air Force Training, Education and Doctrine Development Command
- Komando Pembinaan Doktrin, Pendidikan, dan Latihan TNI Angkatan Udara
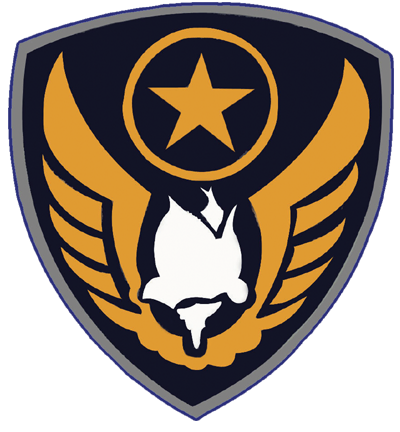
- Insignia of Kodiklatau
- Founded: 15 November 1945; 80 years ago
- Country: Indonesia
- Branch: Indonesian Air Force
- Role: Recruit, train and educate Airmen to deliver airpower for Air Force
- Part of: Indonesian National Armed Forces Training, Education and Doctrine Development Command
- Mottos: Vidyasana Viveka Vardhana transl. 'A Place for Knowledge and Preparedness Development'

Commanders
- Current commander: Air Marshal Dr. Arief Mustofa, M.M.

The Air Force Training, Education and Doctrine Development Command (Indonesian: Komando Pembinaan Doktrin, Pendidikan, dan Latihan TNI Angkatan Udara, abbr. Kodiklatau), is the Main Command for the Development of the Indonesian Air Force which is directly under the Air Force Chief of Staff. Kodiklatau is tasked with organizing first education, formation, development, specialization, transition and other education in order to improve the quality of Indonesian Air Force personnel and carry out the development of an education system, didactic, educational method, and aerospace science as well as fostering aerospace potential within the Kodiklatau and its staff.

This command is led by a Commander with the rank of Air Marshal and Deputy Commander with the rank of Air Vice-Marshal.

== Vision and mission ==
=== Vision ===
Realization of human resources for the Indonesian Air Force who have the spirit of Sapta Marga, professional, efficient and effective in order to be able to face the challenges of future tasks.

=== Mission ===
In order to realize Kodiklatau's vision, Kodiklatau's mission was determined as follows:

- Carry out first education, formation, development, specialization, transition and other education in a professional, effective, efficient and modern manner.
- Carry out studies, development and coaching of the ten components of education in order to create innovative and creative ideas for the benefit of improving education administration.
- Increase cooperation in the field of education with relevant agencies within and outside the Indonesian Air Force for the benefit of the successful implementation of education.
- Improving the function of planning, control and supervision within the Kodiklatau environment through information on the performance accountability system of government agencies.

== Organization ==
=== Education Center ===
Air Force Education Center
Wings	Squadrons	Education Function	Home Bases
100th Education; Wing/Flight	101st Training Squadron (Note: Aircraft operated: G 120TP)	Pilot and Navigator basic training	Adisutjipto Air Base, Yogyakarta
100th Education; Wing/Flight	102nd Training Squadron (Note: Aircraft operated: KT-1B)	Fixed-wing aircraft Pilot and Instructors advance training	Adisutjipto Air Base, Yogyakarta
100th Education; Wing/Flight	103rd Training Squadron (Note: Aircraft operated: UAV-D, Aerostar TUAS)	Unmanned Aerial Vehicle Pilot training	Wiriadinata Air Base, Tasikmalaya
100th Education; Wing/Flight	104th Training Squadron	Aviator ground-based training and class	Adisutjipto Air Base, Yogyakarta
100th Education; Wing/Flight	105th Training Squadron (Note: Aircraft operated: EC120B)	Rotary-wing aircraft Pilot and Instructors training	Suryadarma Air Base, Subang
200th Education; Wing/Electronics	201st Training Squadron	Advanced Technical English school and Military Teacher School	Sulaiman Air Base, Bandung
200th Education; Wing/Electronics	202nd Training Squadron	Electronics basic training	Sulaiman Air Base, Bandung
200th Education; Wing/Electronics	203rd Training Squadron	Advance and specialist electronics training	Sulaiman Air Base, Bandung
200th Education; Wing/Electronics	204th Training Squadron	Radar personnel basic training	Sulaiman Air Base, Bandung
300th Education; Wing/Engineering	301st Training Squadron	Technician Officer basic training	Husein Sastranegara Air Base, Bandung
300th Education; Wing/Engineering	302nd Training Squadron	Engineering personnel basic training	Husein Sastranegara Air Base, Bandung
300th Education; Wing/Engineering	303rd Training Squadron	Electric instruments and Weapon management training	Husein Sastranegara Air Base, Bandung
300th Education; Wing/Engineering	304th Training Squadron	Supply personnel basic training	Husein Sastranegara Air Base, Bandung
400th Education; Wing/First Education, Formation and Vocational	401st Training Squadron	Women Non-commissioned officer basic training	Adisumarmo Air Base, Surakarta
400th Education; Wing/First Education, Formation and Vocational	402nd Training Squadron	Radar personnel advance training	Adisumarmo Air Base, Surakarta
400th Education; Wing/First Education, Formation and Vocational	403rd Training Squadron	Non-commissioned officer basic training	Adisumarmo Air Base, Surakarta
400th Education; Wing/First Education, Formation and Vocational	404th Training Squadron	Enlisted basic training	Adisumarmo Air Base, Surakarta
400th Education; Wing/First Education, Formation and Vocational	405th Training Squadron	Air Force Military Police basic training	Adisumarmo Air Base, Surakarta
500th Education; Wing/General	501st Training Squadron	Administration, specialist and air operations support education	Atang Senjaya Air Base, Bogor
500th Education; Wing/General	502nd Training Squadron	Vocational education, special skills and air operations support training	Atang Senjaya Air Base, Bogor
500th Education; Wing/General	503rd Training Squadron	Indonesian Air Force Civil Servants administrative education	Atang Senjaya Air Base, Bogor
500th Education; Wing/General	504th Training Squadron	Health sector education	Atang Senjaya Air Base, Bogor
500th Education; Wing/General	506th Training Squadron	Cyber and informatics	Atang Senjaya Air Base, Bogor
600th Education; Wing/Provisions	601st Training Squadron		Wiriadinata Air Base, Tasikmalaya
600th Education; Wing/Provisions	602nd Training Squadron		Wiriadinata Air Base, Tasikmalaya
700th Education; Wing/Air Defence	701st Training Squadron		Muljono Air Base, Surabaya
700th Education; Wing/Air Defence	702nd Training Squadron		Muljono Air Base, Surabaya
800th Education; Wing/Quick Reaction; Forces	801st Training Squadron	Quick Reaction Forces basic training	Sulaiman Air Base, Bandung
800th Education; Wing/Quick Reaction; Forces	802nd Training Squadron	Battleground training	Sulaiman Air Base, Bandung
800th Education; Wing/Quick Reaction; Forces	803rd Training Squadron	Quick Reaction Forces advance training	Sulaiman Air Base, Bandung
800th Education; Wing/Quick Reaction; Forces	804th Training Squadron	Point Air Defense training	Sulaiman Air Base, Bandung
800th Education; Wing/Quick Reaction; Forces	805th Training Squadron	Special Forces training	Sulaiman Air Base, Bandung

Air Force Education Center locations

=== Other ===
Emblem	Name
	Air Force Training Center
	Air Force Officer Formation School
	Air Force Unitary Command School (Squadron Officer School)

== See also ==
- National Air Operations Command
- Indonesian Air Force Academy
- Indonesian Air Force
