= Indonesian National Air Defense Forces Command =

- Komando Pertahanan Udara Nasional Indonesia
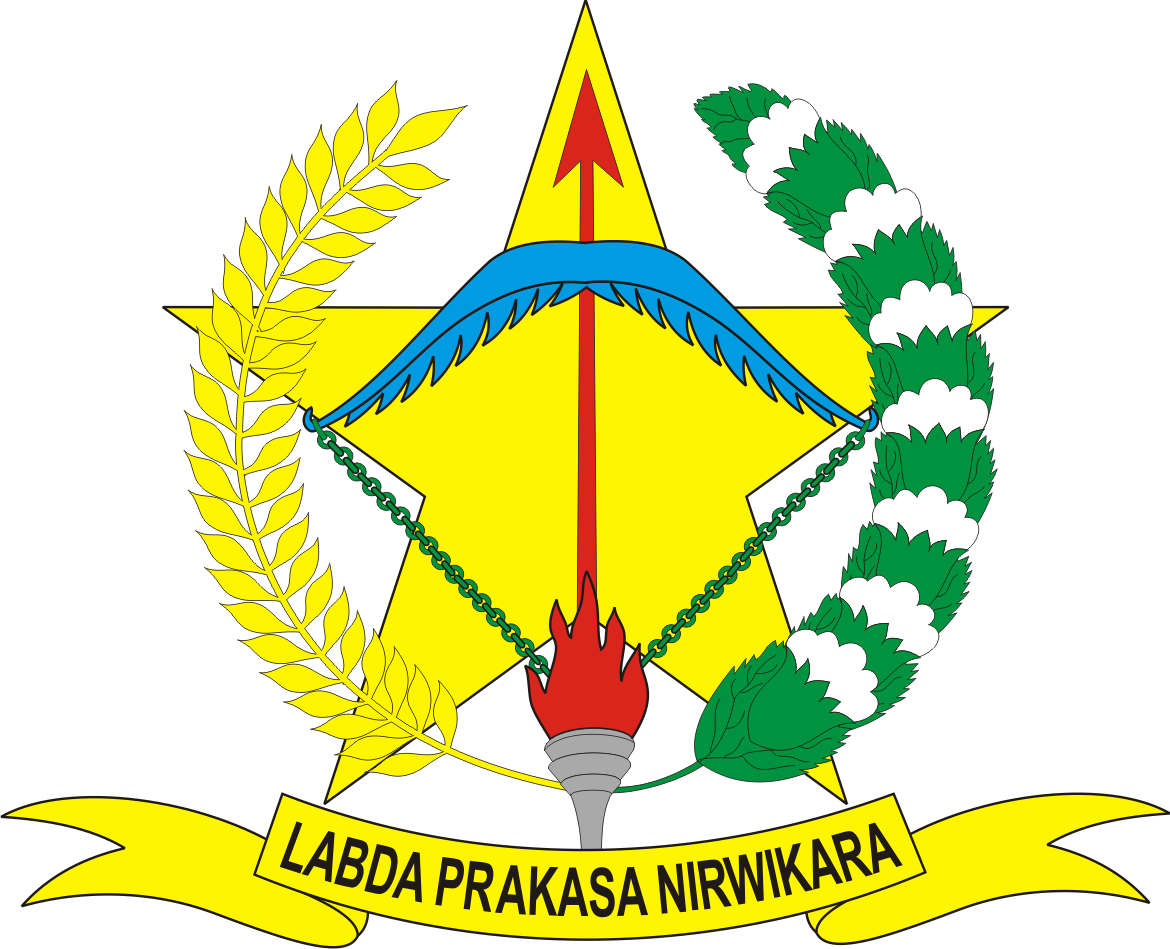
- Badge of Kohanudnas
- Active: 19 February 1962 as Joint air defence 10 August 2025 as its current form
- Country: Indonesia
- Type: Air Defense Command
- Role: Early-warning radar; Air Defense
- Part of: Indonesian National Armed Forces, Tentara Nasional Indonesia (TNI)
- Mottos: Labda Prakasa Nirwikara transl. 'With special skills, steadfastness and high personality, he is able to overcome danger in any form.'

Commanders
- Commander: Air Marshall Andyawan Martono Putra
- Notable commanders: Col. Leo Wattimena (id); Col. Rudi Taran (id)

The Indonesian National Air Defence Command (Indonesian: Komando Pertahanan Udara Nasional / Kohanudnas) is one of the Major Operational Commands of the Indonesian National Armed Forces that is responsible for air surveillance, early warning system and air defense of Indonesian airspace. Kohanudnas plays a vital part for air defense capability of the Republic of Indonesia. Kohanudnas report directly to National Armed Forces HQ, and not part of Indonesian Air Force although most of its personnel are picked from the Air Force.

== History ==
=== History of Joint Air Defense Command ===
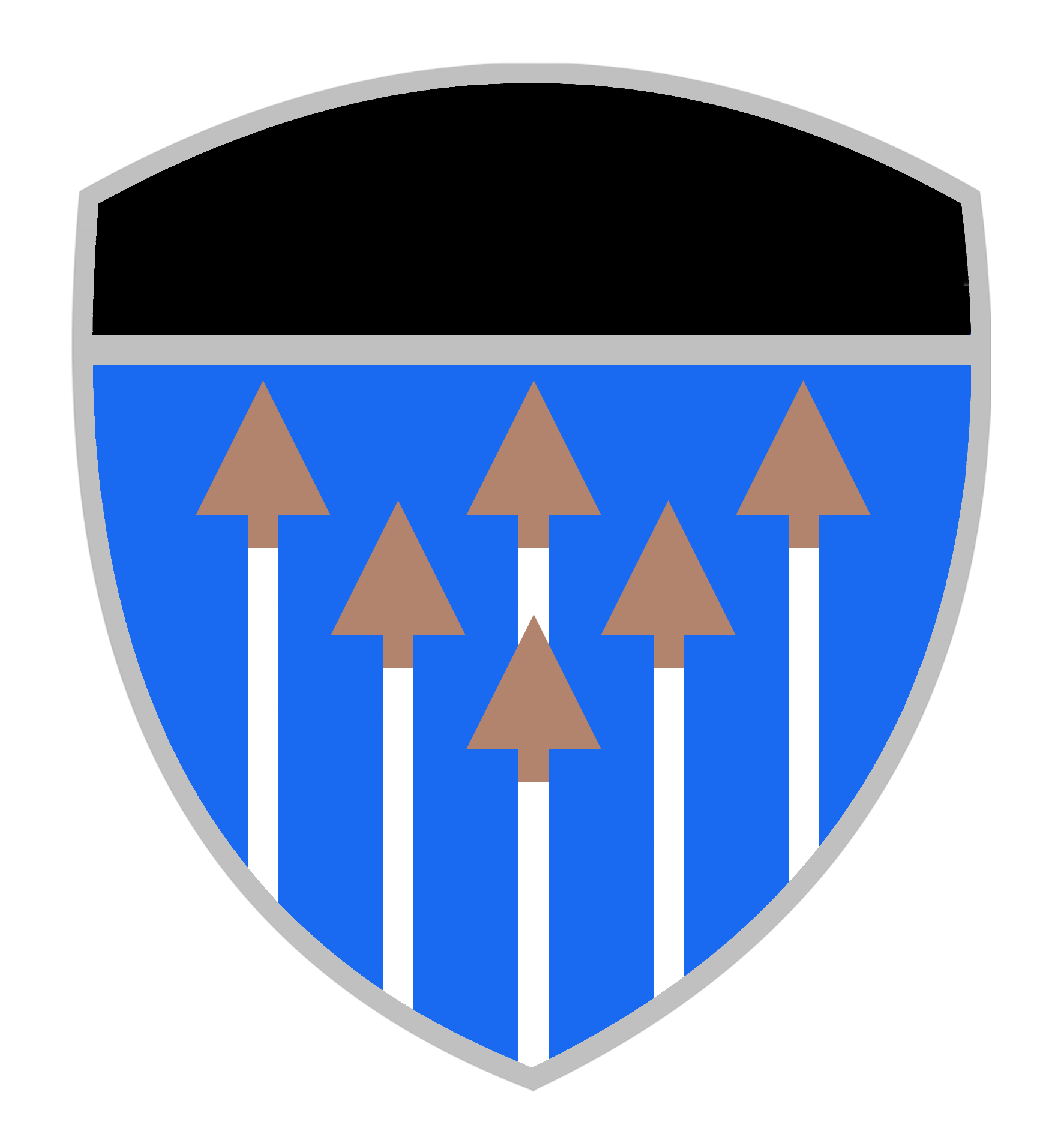
Badge of the Indonesian Air Force's Air Defense Command (Kohanud)

The forerunner to the National Air Defence Command (Kohanudnas) was the Sector Operation Centre (SOC) formed in 1958. Then the Joint Air Defense Command (Kohanudgab) was formed in 1961, its members came from the army, navy and air force. Kohanudgab is tasked with guarding defense centers in the eastern part of Indonesia. Furthermore, the National Air Defense Command (Indonesian: Komando Pertahanan Udara Nasional / Kohanudnas) was formed based on the Decree of the President of the Republic of Indonesia No. 08/PIM/PI/1962 dated 9 February 1962. Kohanudnas as the Main Operations Command of the Armed Forces of the Republic of Indonesia, is tasked with carrying out integrated security defense efforts over national air space both independently and in collaboration with the main operational commands of other forces. Interoperability in the use of defense equipment such as fighter aircraft, radar, air defense artillery, and Navy warships.

At the early of 1962, Operation Trikora was getting underway as the Indonesian National Armed Forces (TNI) were already engaging the military forces of The Netherlands in what is now Papua and West Papua provinces. The National Air Defense Command was established on 19 February 1962 as the air defense division of that operation commanded by AVM H.M. Sujono on the basis of the TNI Joint Service Air Defense Command (Komando Pertahanan Udara Gabungan APRI) whose commander for Papuan air force operations was Colonel Leo Wattimena of the Air Force. At the beginning, the INADF was organized into 2 Air defense sectors covering parts of the Moluccas and the then Netherlands New Guinea, each composed of a number of radar stations. By March 1962, four Air Defense Sectors were active nationwide.

After the conclusion of Operation Trikora, the command was the first to be equipped with surface to air missiles in Southeast Asia, with the arrival of the S-75 Dvina SAM system, which served alongside the AZP S-60, M1939 61-K, M1939 52-K, Zastava M55, Bofors 40 mm gun and the Oerlikon GDF until the early 1970s, alongside radar stations built with Warsaw Pact and Yugoslav assistance.

The Air Force Air Defense Command, raised on 12 September 1963, form majority of the personnel under the Kohanudnas. Its primary mission is to develop and prepare combat readiness of air defense capabilities of the air force. The Air Defense Command is based at Halim Perdanakusuma Airport and has 4 air defense wings, which are 100th Missile Defense Wing, 200th Radar Wing, 300th Interceptor Wing, and 400th Radar Wing. Aside from these, personnel of the Army Air Defense Artillery Corps and the Directorate of Air Defense Operations of the Navy, both of the Indonesian Army and Indonesian Navy, respectively and activated in 1962, are under its operational supervision.

The National Air Defense Command was liquidated on 28 January 2022, its role was taken by the newly created National Air Operation Command (Komando Operasi Udara Nasional or Koopsudnas).

On 10 August 2025, the National Air Defense Command (Kohanudnas) was re-established as an independent unit from the National Air Operation Command.

== Notable events ==
=== Bawean Incident ===
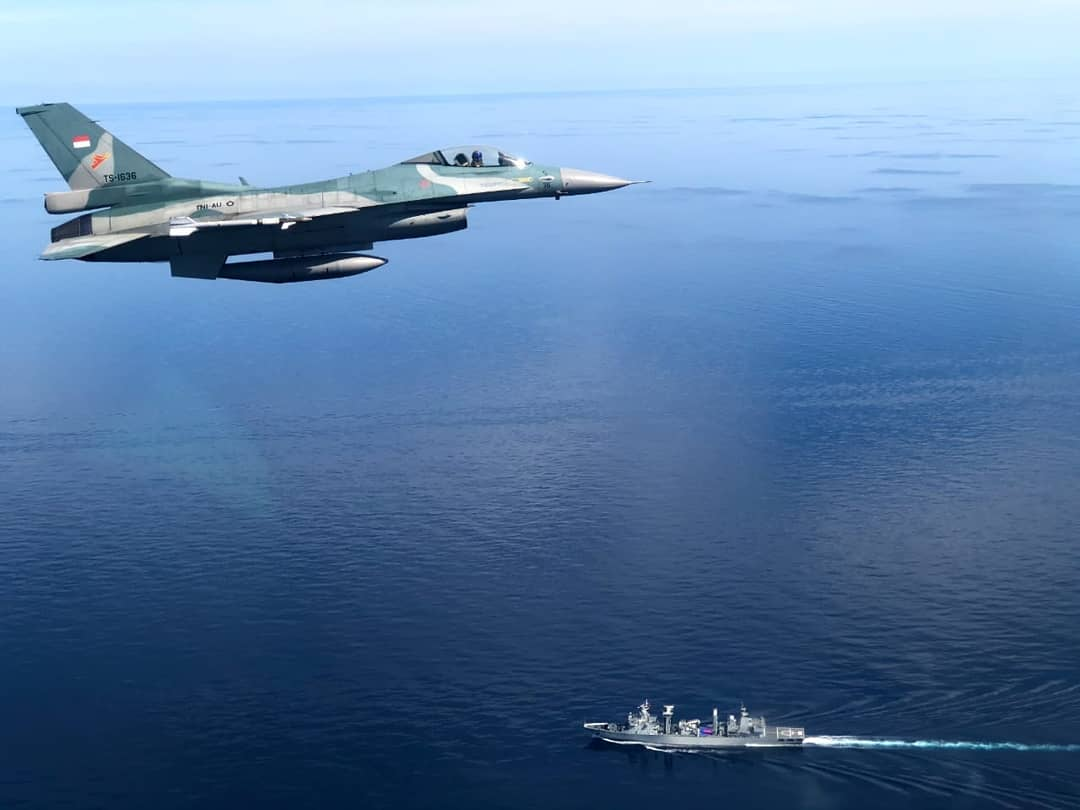
Indonesian Air Force F-16 Fighting Falcon over a Chinese Navy Type 903 off the coast of Natuna Islands, Riau Islands, similar to the one in the Bawean Incident.

In July 2003, Kohanudnas detected unauthorized military aircraft flying over Bawean Island off the eastern coast of Java for more than two hours, and ordered the Indonesian Air Force to scrambled two fully armed F-16s Block 15 OCU from the 3rd Air Squadron to intercept the unauthorized aircraft, which were five US Navy F/A-18 Hornets. The incident ended peacefully through a Friend or Foe hand signal. A US spokesman said that the naval aircraft had sought permission to enter Indonesian airspace while escorting a US aircraft carrier, but that the request arrived too late at the Kohanudnas headquarters in Jakarta due to red tape.

=== Pakistan International Airlines Incident ===
Pakistan International Airlines's Boeing 737-300 was detected entering Indonesian airspace without diplomatic clearance on 7 March 2011. Kohanudnas then ordered the Air Force to scramble a pair of Sukhoi to intercept and force the aircraft to land at Hasanuddin airport.

=== Papua New Guinea Aircraft Incident ===
On 29 November 2011, Syamsudin Noor Airport's radar detected Dassault Falcon 900 EX that carried Papua New Guinean Deputy Prime Minister H.O.N. Belden Namah entering Indonesian airspace, then the airport's ATC and Kohanudnas tries to contact the aircraft as it is an unscheduled flight, but no response. As Kohanudnas also didn't authorize aircraft flight clearance, they decide to scramble two Sukhoi fighter to intercept and shadowing the Falcon near Banjarmasin, South Kalimantan, for about 37 minutes. It was found that Falcon was applied for flight clearance shortly before take-off and the clearance was not granted yet during the incident. The minister of foreign affairs of Indonesia said that Kohanudnas was conducting an electronic identification with radar and a visual identification by intercepting (the aircraft) according to standard procedures, and no harm occurred.
