= Panglima =

Military title used in Malay world

Panglima (archaic form: penglima, Jawi: ڤڠليم) a military title used in Indonesia and Malaysia, and historically in the Philippines. It means 'a commander of a body of troops' deriving from lima, a long-obsolete word for 'hand'. In the past it is used to call some prominent military leaders in Malay world. The prominent Malacca and succeeding Johor Sultanates place the position of a penglima as below that of a menteri. Walter William Skeat writes that Semang tribes north of Malay Peninsula are often headed by shamans (belian) also titled pelima.

In modern times it is reserved for the chiefs of the armed forces of Indonesia and Malaysia and some other posts.

== Use in Indonesia ==
=== Panglima Tertinggi Angkatan Bersenjata Republik Indonesia ===
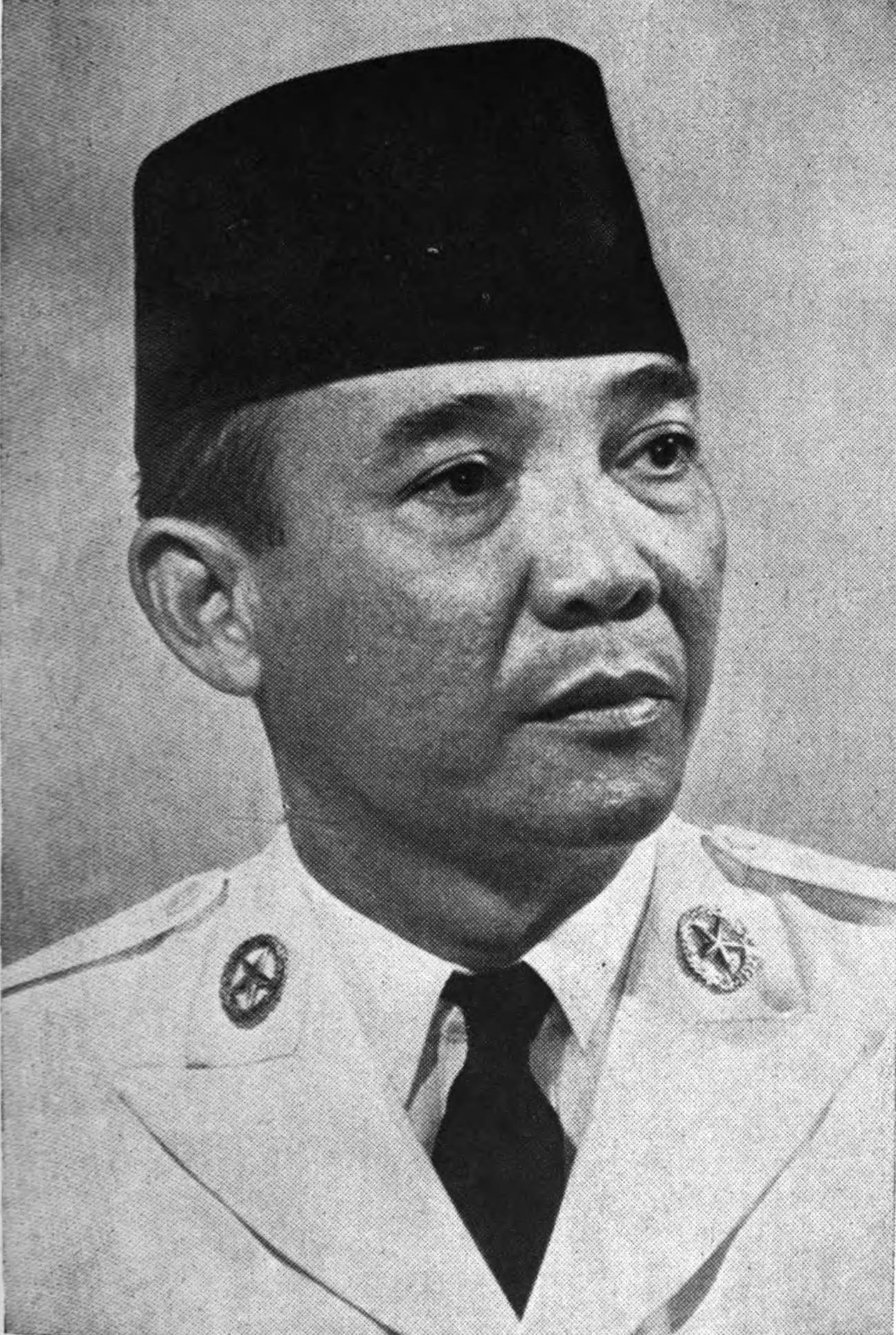
Sukarno, Presiden Republik Indonesia, Panglima Tertinggi Angkatan Bersenjata Republik Indonesia, Pemimpin Besar Revolusi, Mandataris MPRS (President of the Republic of Indonesia, Supreme Commander of the Armed Forces of Indonesia, Great Leader of the Revolution, Mandatary of Provisional People's Consultative Assembly)

As stipulated in article 10 of Indonesian Constitution, the President of Indonesia is the Supreme Commander of Indonesian Armed Forces (Panglima Tertinggi Angkatan Bersenjata Republik Indonesia). Essentially it is parallel to the title 'Commander-in-Chief' in other countries, e.g. the United States.

During the Old Order era, this title is included into many honorific titles that were often mentioned each time Sukarno's name was written or read in speeches, edicts, or news.

=== Panglima TNI ===
In Indonesian National Armed Forces, the highest position overseeing the three branches—Army, Navy, and Air Force—is known as the Panglima Tentara National Indonesia ('Commander of the Indonesian National Armed Forces'). Before the National Police separated from the Armed Forces in 2000, the organization comprised four branches and was known as Angkatan Bersenjata Republik Indonesia (ABRI). This included the TNI and the Police. The commander of the Armed Forces at that time was referred to as the Panglima ABRI, commonly abbreviated as Pangab.

According to the revised Constitution, the Panglima is appointed by the president, but the appointment must first be confirmed by the House of Representatives. Prior to the 2002 constitutional amendment, the president held the prerogative to appoint or dismiss the Panglima at their discretion.

=== Panglima Besar ===
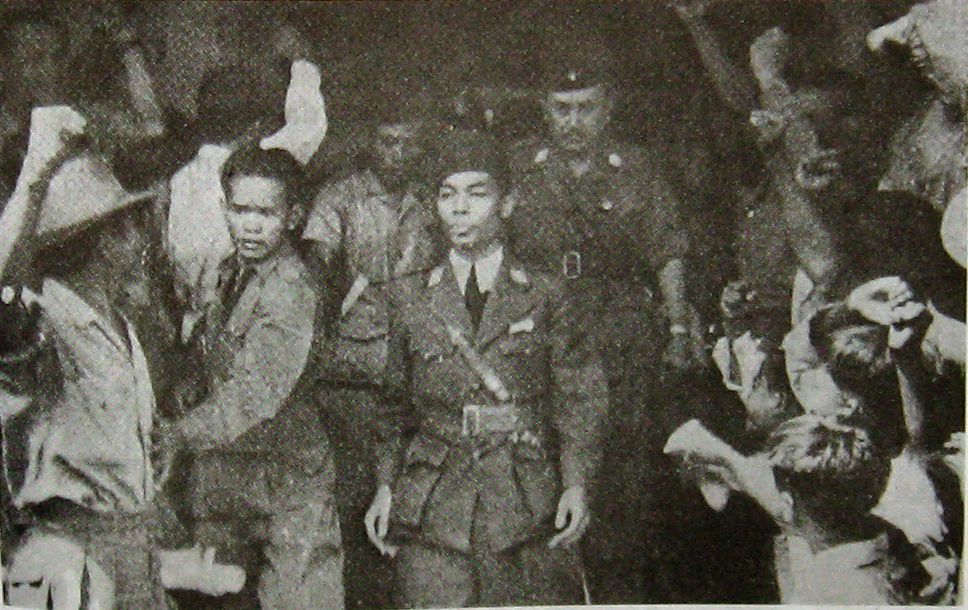
Panglima Besar General Sudirman (center), the first Commander of Indonesian National Armed Forces, arriving in Jakarta on 1 November 1946

The honorific title Panglima Besar, meaning 'Grand Commander' was informally bestowed upon Sudirman, the first Commander of the Armed Forces and a key leader of guerilla war during Indonesian National Revolution (1945–1949).

=== Other military uses ===
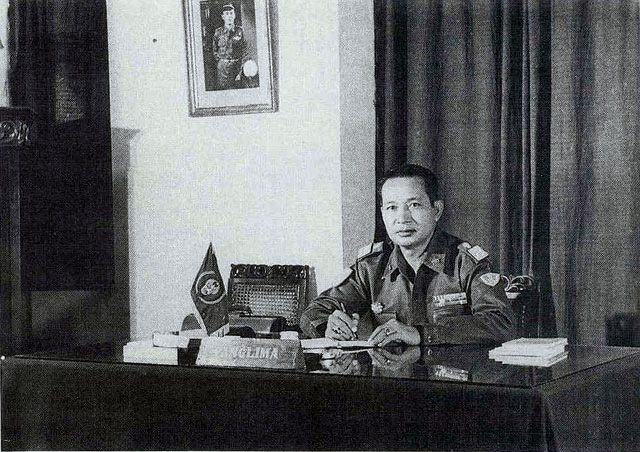
Major General Suharto in his office as Panglima Kostrad, (Commander of the Strategic Reserve Command), 1963

The title Panglima is widely used across various branches and formations within the Indonesian Armed Forces, signifying its importance in military leadership roles:

==== Army ====
- The commander of Kostrad, a strategic reserve command within the Army, is referred to as the Panglima Kostrad. Notably, the first Panglima Kostrad was Suharto, who later became the President of Indonesia (1968–1998), followed by Umar Wirahadikusumah, who went on to serve as the Vice President of Indonesia (1983–1988).
- The commanders of the 15 Regional Military Commands (Komando Daerah Militer or Kodam) are known as Panglima Daerah Militer (Pangdam).
- The commander of Kopassus, a special forces command within the Army, is referred to as the Panglima Kopassus.

==== Navy ====
- The commanders of the three Fleet Commands (Komando Armada I/II/III) hold the title Panglima Armada I/II/III (Pangarmada I/II/III).
- The highest position in the Military Sea-lift Command (Komando Lintas Laut Militer or Kolinlamil) is held by the Panglima Kolinlamil.
- The commander of Indonesian Marine Corps, the naval infantry and main amphibious warfare force of Indonesia within the Navy, is referred to as the Panglima Korps Marinir.

==== Air Force ====
- The commander of the National Air Defense Command (Komando Pertahanan Udara Nasional or Kohanudnas) is referred to as the Panglima Kohanudnas.
- The commander of the National Air Operations Command (Komando Operasi Udara Nasional or Koopsudnas) is referred to as the Panglima Koopsudnas.
- The commanders of the three Air Force Regional Commands (Komando Daerah Angkatan Udara I/II/III or Kodau I/II/III) are titled Panglima Kodau I/II/III.
- The commander of Kopasgat, the air force infantry and special forces corps of the Indonesian Air Force within the Air Force, is referred to as the Panglima Kopasgat.

=== Past usage ===
Upon the formation of the Fourth Working Cabinet on 19 November 1963, the title Panglima was used for the commanders of each branch of the Indonesian Armed Forces. These commanders were also members of the Cabinet and were therefore given the title Menteri (Minister), appointed directly by the President. Their titles were as follows:

- Minister/Commander of the Army (Menteri/Panglima Angkatan Darat, abbreviated Menpangad)
- Minister/Commander of the Navy (Menteri/Panglima Angkatan Laut, abbreviated Menpangal)
- Minister/Commander of the Air Force (Menteri/Panglima Angkatan Udara, abbreviated Menpangau)
- Minister/Commander of the Police (Menteri/Panglima Angkatan Kepolisian, abbreviated Menpangak)

This practice was discontinued during the New Order era, when the title Panglima was replaced with Kepala Staf (Chief of Staff) for the commanders of the three military branches and Kepala Kepolisian Republik Indonesia for the Chief of the National Police.

Additionally, until January 2022, the National Air Defence Forces Command (Komando Pertahanan Udara Nasional or Kohanudnas) also used the title Panglima for its highest position, Panglima Kohanudnas, as well as for the commanders of each Air Defense Sector (Panglima Komando Sektor Pertahanan Udara Nasional or Pangkosek Hanudnas).

== Use in Malaysia ==
=== Panglima Angkatan Tentera ===
In the Malaysian Armed Forces (Angkatan Tentera Malaysia), the highest position overseeing the branches—Army, Navy, and Air Force—is called the Panglima Angkatan Tentera Malaysia (officially translated as "'Chief of Defence Force'").

=== Panglima Tentera ===
Each branch of the Malaysian Armed Forces is headed by a Panglima. Chief of Army is known as the Panglima Tentera Darat, the Chief of Navy as the Panglima Tentera Laut, and the Chief of Air Force as the Panglima Tentera Udara. Each of these branches also has a deputy commander, titled Timbalan Panglima (Deputy Chief).

=== Other uses ===
The term 'Panglima' is also used in several titles within the orders and decorations of Malaysia, such as Panglima Mangku Negara (P.M.N), Panglima Setia Mahkota (P.S.M.), Panglima Jasa Negara (P.J.N.), and Panglima Setia Diraja (P.S.D.).

Additionally, PASKAL, Royal Malaysian Navy's special operation force, is also referred to as Panglima Hitam.

== Other usage ==
- Panglima Estino - 5th class municipality in the province of Sulu, Philippines.
- Panglima Sugala - 3rd class municipality in the province of Tawi-Tawi, Philippines.
- RSS Panglima - was the first ship of the Republic of Singapore Navy. Naval Military Experts Institute, co-located in Changi Naval Base, is named RSS Panglima in honour of the first ship of the navy.

== See also ==
- Penghulu
- Indonesian National Armed Forces
- Malaysian Armed Forces
- Orders, decorations, and medals of Malaysia
