= TSY =

TSY may refer to:

- Tasikmalaya Airport (IATA airport code TSY), Tasikmalaya, West Java, Indonesia
- Tsing Yi station (MTR station code TSY), Hong Kong
