= 2003 Bawean incident =

Aerial combat between Indonesian and US fighter jets

Coordinates: 5.522°S 112.574°E

2003 Bawean Incident
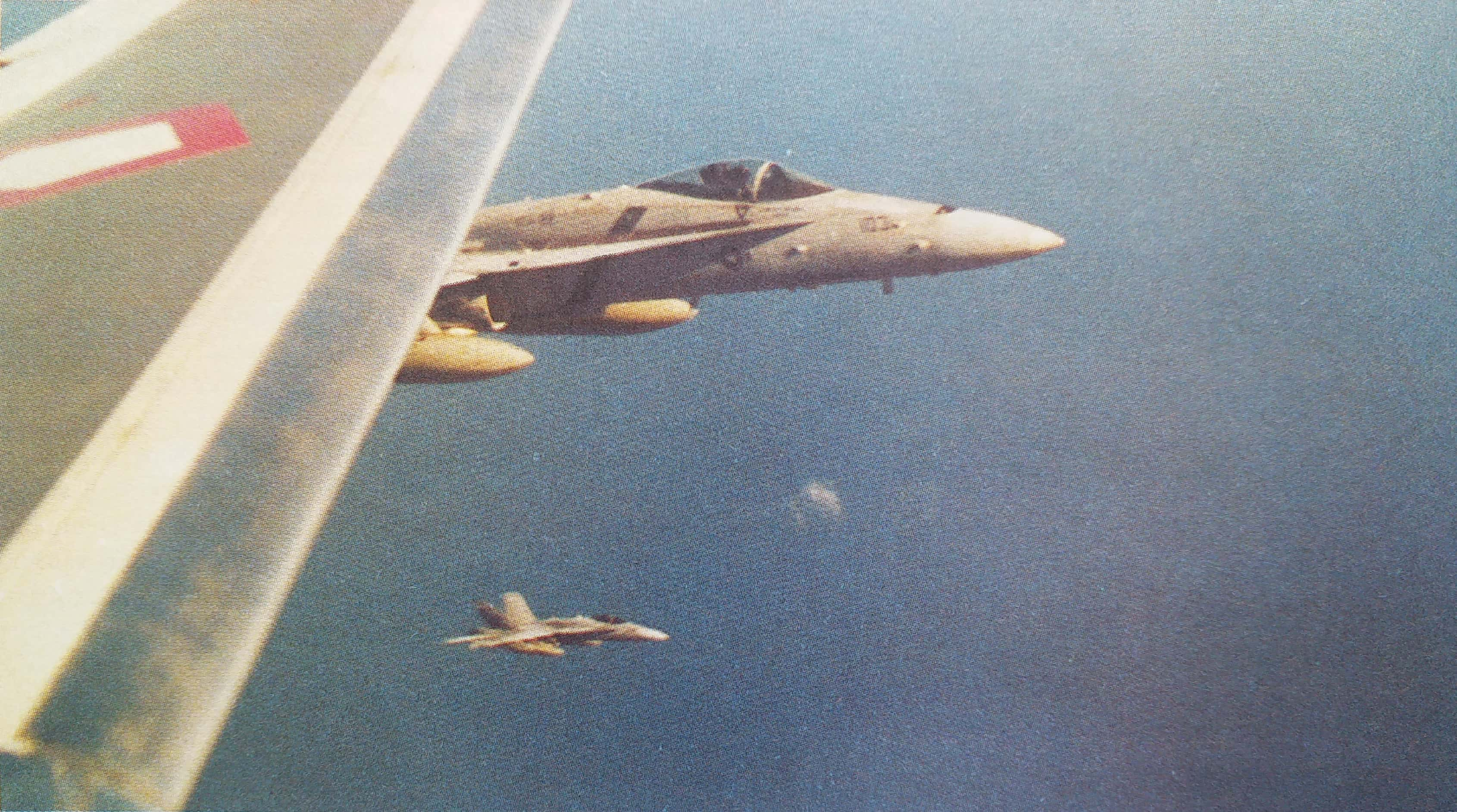
- Two F/A-18C Hornets from USS Carl Vinson photographed by an Indonesian Air Force B737-200 over the sea off Lombok Island, 4 July 2003
Date	3 July 2003
Location	Near Bawean Island in the Java Sea
Result	F/A-18 Hornet jammed Indonesian F-16B, but another F/A-18 Hornet was successfully locked by Indonesian Air Force F-16B.; Resolved with signals and communication; US Carrier Strike Group leaves Indonesian territory; Indonesia filed a diplomatic complaint to the United States

Belligerents
Indonesia: Indonesian Air Force; 3rd Air Squadron	United States: United States Navy; USS Carl Vinson; VFA-22

Strength
2 F-16B Fighting Falcon	5 F/A-18 Hornet

The 2003 Bawean incident was an incident on 3 July 2003 where two Indonesian Air Force F-16 Fighting Falcons were sent to intercept five US Navy F/A-18 Hornets fighter jets from the aircraft carrier USS Carl Vinson. The F-16s and F/A-18s engaged in a dogfight, missile lock and electronic warfare near Bawean Island in the Java Sea, north of Java.

== Incident ==
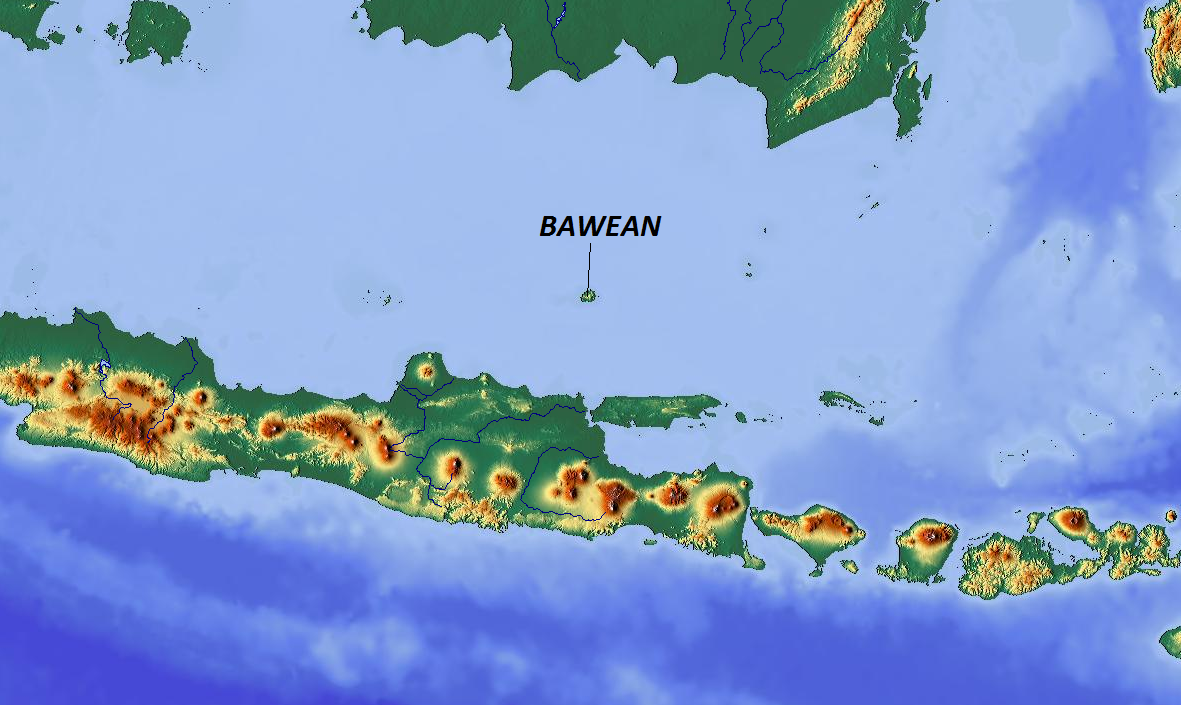
Location of Bawean

The incident began at 11:38 UTC+7:00 on 3 July 2003 when military-civilian radar at Ngurah Rai International Airport in Denpasar, Bali detected suspicious movement of several aircraft northwest of Bawean Island, with the altitude observed to be between 15,000 ft (4,600 m) to 35,000 ft (11,000 m) and speed of 450 kn (830 km/h). The movement of these aircraft was also reported by a nearby commercial Boeing 737-200 of Bouraq Airlines. Because the aircraft later disappeared from radar, the Sector II National Air Defense Command and the National Air Defense Operations Center did not report it to the headquarters.

Three hours later radar detected more activity on the Green 63 civil flight route near Bawean Island or 66 nautical miles (122 km; 76 mi) from Surabaya.

Because the aircraft were not communicating with air traffic control, it was deemed dangerous for civil aviation. At 15:00, the commander of the Second National Air Defense Sector Command formally requested the permission to visually identify the suspicious radar contacts by sending interceptors.

A pair of armed F-16B Fighting Falcons of 3rd Air Squadron took off from Iswahjudi AFB at 17:02 and were sent to the reported location. The two F-16B fighter jets, tail number TS-1602 and TS-1603, had just returned from military operation in Aceh. The TS-1603, callsign Falcon 1 was piloted by Capt. Ian Fuady (flight leader) and Capt. Fajar Adriyanto, while TS-1602, callsign Falcon 2, was flown by Capt. Tony Harjono and Capt. Satriyo Utomo. Each aircraft was armed with two AIM-9P-4 missiles and a single 20 mm autocannon with 450 rounds.

The F-16s were guided to the reported location by Surabaya air surveillance radar. The ground radar detected five unidentified aircraft. At 17:21, Falcon 1 detected two unidentified aircraft at a range of 35 nautical miles (65 km), with Surabaya radar informing that the two aircraft were heading towards the F-16s. A minute later at 17:22, both sides were involved in jamming each other's electronics. Moments later, Falcon 1 was radar locked by the target, which ended up being identified as US Navy F/A-18 Hornets. Dogfight ensued between both sides, which lasted for 18 minutes. At the same time, Falcon 1 also spotted an aircraft carrier, two frigates and a tanker heading east.

The engagement ended when Falcon 2 rocked its wings and Falcon 1 successfully establishing a radio communication with the F/A-18s. The American aircraft claimed to be operating in international waters.

After establishing contact, the F/A-18s flew away and landed at USS Carl Vinson and the F-16s returned to Iswahjudi Air Force Base.

== Investigation and aftermath ==
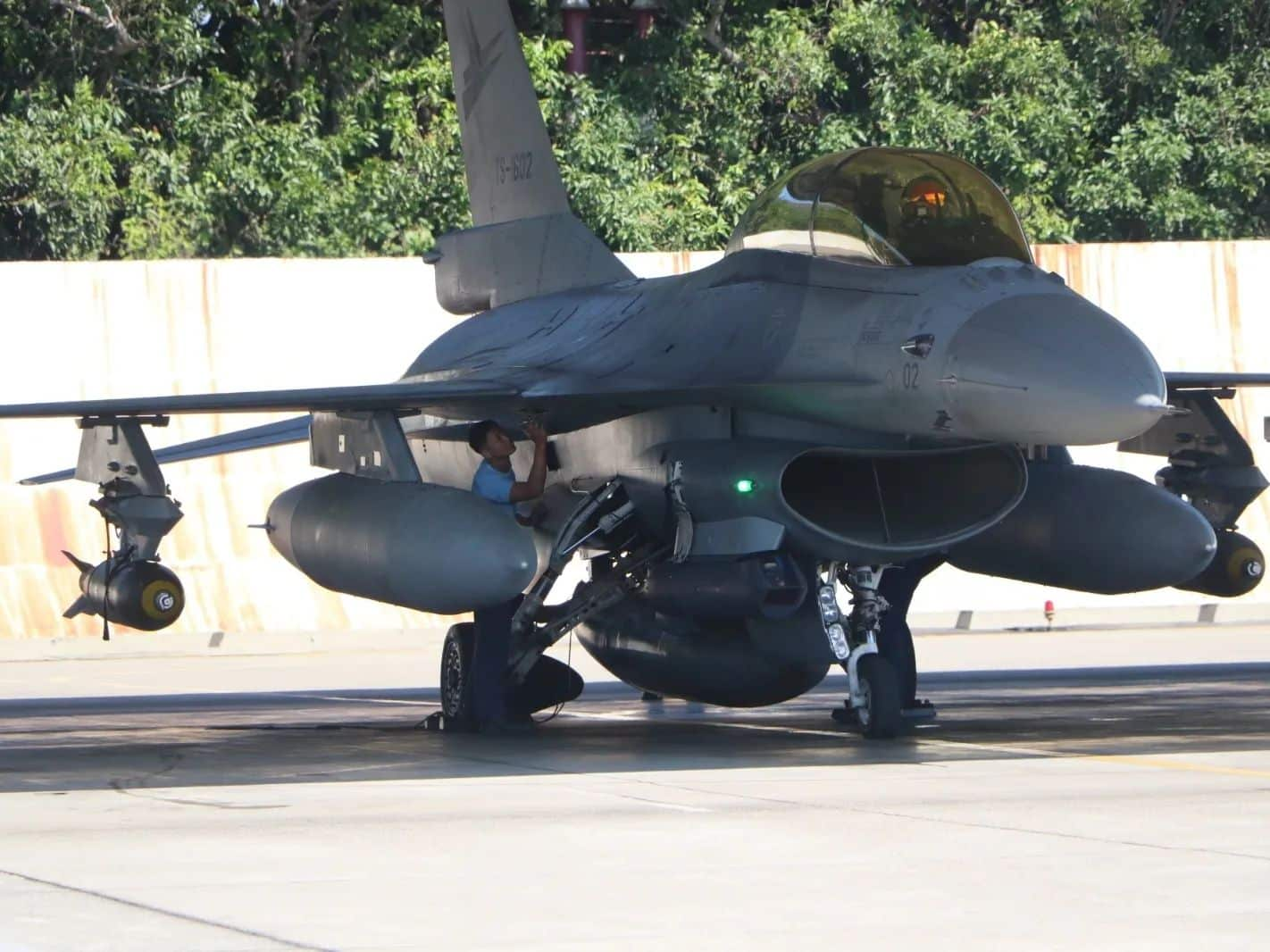
Indonesian Air Force F-16BM (TS-1602) the same aircraft involved in the incident, 20 years later in 2023

After the F-16s landed, the Indonesian Air Force received information from Bali Air Traffic Control that the Hornets are part of US Naval fleet and that the Hornets just contacted Bali ATC to report their activity.

The five Hornets intercepted were from the Carl Vinson, a Nimitz-class supercarrier sailing from west to east with two frigates and a destroyer. From the results of monitoring by the Indonesian Air Force, the convoy of US Navy warships in the vicinity of Bawean Island was traveling at 20 knots (37 km/h; 23 mph) and was heading for Madura and Kangean Islands 12 hours later. Bawean Island is located in the Java Sea between the Indonesian island of Java to the south and Borneo to the north. To the west lies the island of Sumatra and the Bangka Belitung Islands, and to the east are the outer islands of South Sulawesi Province.

Because the United States did not ratify the 1982 UNCLOS, they did not recognize the Java Sea as territorial waters. Priyatna Abdurrasyid, a legal expert on airspace law, argued that United States has violated the Article 1 of Chicago Convention.

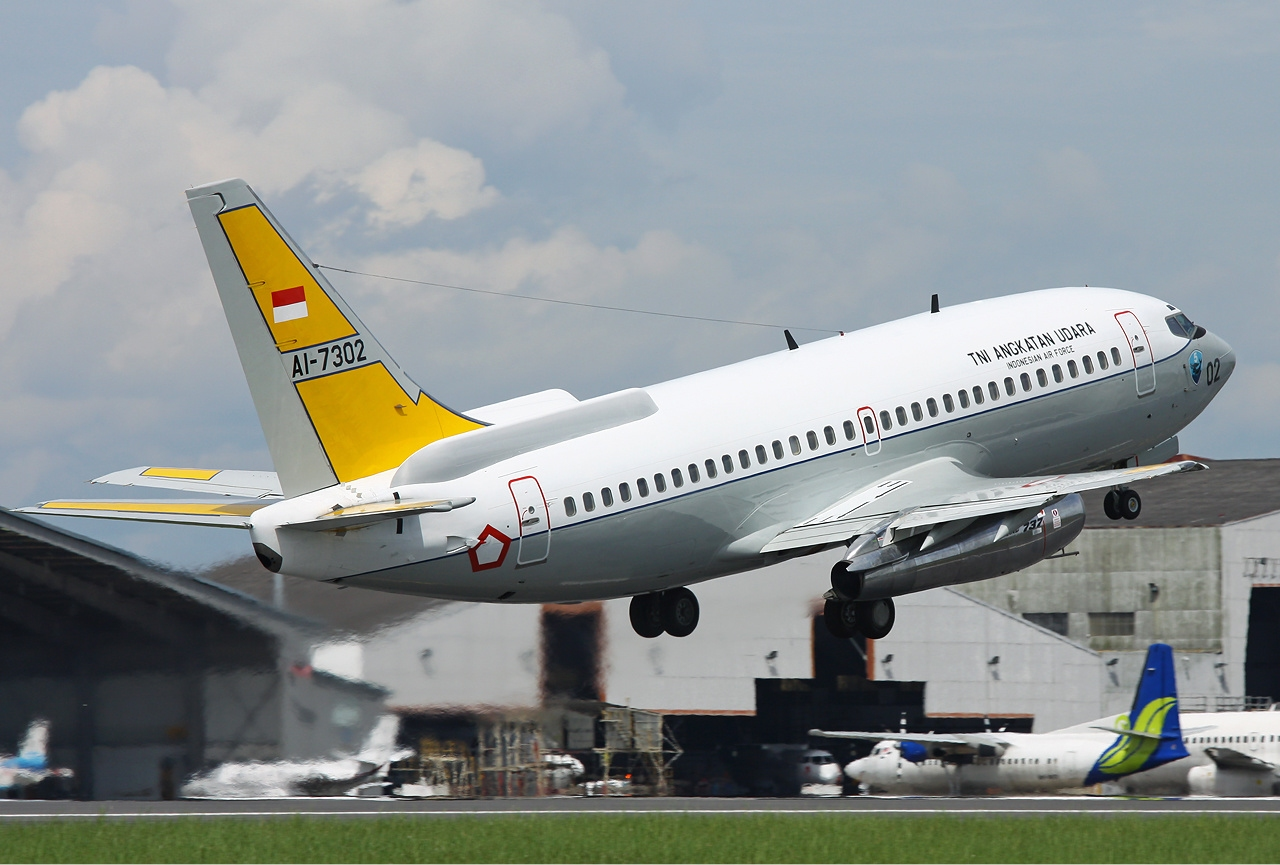
Indonesian Air Force 737-200 'Surveiller' maritime patrol aircraft, equipped with SLAMMR radars

The Indonesian Air Force sent a Boeing 737-200 Surveiller reconnaissance aircraft at around 07:00 UTC+8:00 on 4 July to monitor their movements. When the 737 contacted the Hornets to ask where they are heading, the Hornets replied "We are in international waters."

The American warship fleet was still transiting the area and claimed to be in international waters. On that occasion, the 737 photographed the Carl Vinson, two frigates, and a destroyer. This reconnaissance was escorted by two US Navy F/A-18 Hornets.

Following up on this incident, the House of Representatives of Indonesia (DPR) asked the Indonesian government, through the Minister of Foreign Affairs and the Minister of Defense, to issue a protest diplomatic note against the United States government. From the photos that were captured, the Indonesian government protested to the United States for entering Indonesian waters without permission.

The United States Embassy in Jakarta stated that the naval convoy had sought permission from the Indonesian government and that the warplanes involved in the incident did not violate international laws and that they had informed the Indonesian authorities beforehand about the exercise they were conducting. Indonesia denied receiving notification and said it did not issue security clearance for the Navy convoy. However, Indonesian Rear Air Marshal Wresnowiro said the US Navy requested permission to transit, "but our bureaucracy is too slow to pass the security clearance."

Carl Vinson went on to visit Perth on 14 July 2003. The carrier then visited Hong Kong on 6 August travelling back through the Java Sea on a similar path as in early July. During the 2003 deployment, VFA-22, VMFA-314, VFA-146, and VFA-147 deployed on Carl Vinson apparently with F/A-18C/D Hornet aircraft. It is not clear which squadron was involved in this incident, although according to an Indonesian monthly aviation magazine Angkasa, the F/A-18 Hornets belonged to VFA-22.
