= Prince M. Bunyamin Air Force Base =

Indonesian air force base

- Pangkalan TNI Angkatan Udara Pangeran M. Bunyamin
- Tulang Bawang Regency, Lampung in Indonesia

Site information
- Type: Air force base
- Owner: Government of Indonesia
- Operator: Indonesian Air Force
- Controlled by: Indonesian Air Force
- Condition: Operational

Location
- Location in Lampung Lanud Pangeran M. Bunyamin (Lampung)
- Coordinates: 04°36′41″S 105°13′56″E

Airfield information
- Identifiers: IATA: AKQ, ICAO: WILM
Runways
Direction	Length and surface
07/25	1,950 metres (6,398 ft) Asphalt
- Directorate General of Civil Aviation

Prince M. Bunyamin Air Force Base (Indonesian: Pangkalan TNI Angkatan Udara Pangeran M. Bunyamin) (IATA: AKQ, ICAO: WILM) is an Indonesian Air Force base located in Astra Ksetra, Menggala, Tulang Bawang Regency, Lampung, Indonesia. It was previously known as Astra Ksetra Air Force Base (Pangkalan TNI Angkatan Udara Astra Ksetra) before being renamed in 2016. The base is operated by the Indonesian Air Force and is used for military aviation and training activities.

== History ==
The base was previously known as Astra Ksetra Air Force Base and was established in 1959 as the Air Force branch's combat training centre under Commander of the National Armed Forces/Chief of Staff of the Air Force Soerjadi Soerjadarma regulation No. 02 RI PERPU/1959 of 25 January 1959. The base is located in Menggala District, Tulang Bawang Regency, approximately 20 kilometres north of Menggala and about 103 kilometres north of Bandar Lampung.

In October 2016, the Chief of Staff of the Air Force issued a decree changing its name to Prince M. Bunyamin Air Force Base. The new name was officially inaugurated on 9 November 2016 by Air Operations Command I commander Yuyu Sutisna. The base is named after Pangeran Mohammad Bun Yamin, an Air Force personnel whose name was adopted as part of a programme to commemorate Air Force pioneers and regional figures.

In 2017, the Indonesian Air Force and the Lampung provincial government discussed the possible use of the base for civil aviation operations in addition to its military role.

== Facilities ==
Prince M. Bunyamin Air Force Base has a runway measuring 1,950 x 60 metres and total runway strip of 2,070 x 60 metres.

The base includes an Air Weapon Range (AWR) used for air-to-ground weapons training exercises.

In 2024, an A-4 Skyhawk aircraft monument was relocated to the front area of the base.

== Role and operations ==
Prince M. Bunyamin Air Force Base is used for military training and operational activities of the Indonesian Air Force.

In June 2024, the Air Weapon Range was used for the Jalak Sakti 2024 and Trisula Perkasa exercises involving aircraft, helicopters, and Kopasgat units.
