= Fajar Adriyanto =

Indonesian military officer and pilot (1970–2025)

Air Vice-Marshal (Posth.) Fajar Adriyanto
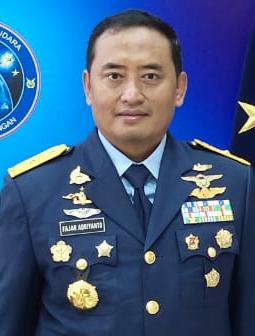
- Portrait as Head of the Air Force Public Relations Service
- Nickname: "Red Wolf"
- Born: 20 June 1970; Malang, East Java, Indonesia
- Died: 3 August 2025 (aged 55) Bogor, West Java, Indonesia
- Allegiance: Indonesia
- Branch: Indonesian Air Force
- Service years: 1992–2025
- Rank: Air vice-marshal (posthumous)
- Commands: Air Force Aerospace Potential Development Center; Air Force Public Relations Service; Manuhua Air Force Base; 3rd Air Squadron
- Conflicts: 2003–2004 Indonesian offensive in Aceh; 2003 Bawean incident

Fajar Adriyanto (20 June 1970 – 3 August 2025) was an Indonesian Air Force officer and pilot.

== Biography ==
Fajar graduated from the Air Force Academy in 1992 and became an F-16 Fighting Falcon fighter pilot, with the call sign "Red Wolf". He served as the commander of the 3rd Air Squadron based at Iswahyudi Air Force Base from 2007 to 2010, and Commander of the Manuhua Air Force Base, Biak, in 2017–2019. He served as the Head of the Indonesian Air Force Public Relations Service from 2019 to 2020, his last command being the Head of the Indonesian Air Force Aerospace Potential Development Center from 2024 until his death in 2025.

While a member of the 3rd Squadron of Iswahyudi Air Base, Fajar was one of the aviators involved in the Bawean Incident, where two units of F-16 Fighting Falcons belonging to the Indonesian Air Force carried out air combat, radar locking, and electronic warfare against two F/A-18 Hornet units from the aircraft carrier USS Carl Vinson belonging to the United States Navy. The incident occurred near Bawean Island in the Java Sea on the afternoon of 3 July 2003.

=== Death ===
On 3 August 2025, a Quicksilver GT500 civilian training aircraft with registration number PK-S126 belonging to the Indonesian Aero Sport Federation (FASI) crashed into a field in Benteng Village, Ciampea District, Bogor Regency. Fajar and a co-pilot named Roni were reported as the occupants of the plane, with Fajar being pronounced dead before reaching a local hospital.

He was buried at Monyetan Cemetery in Probolinggo, East Java on 4 August. He was posthumously given the rank of air vice-marshal.
