= National Air Operation Command =

Indonesian Air Force command

- Komando Operasi Udara Nasional
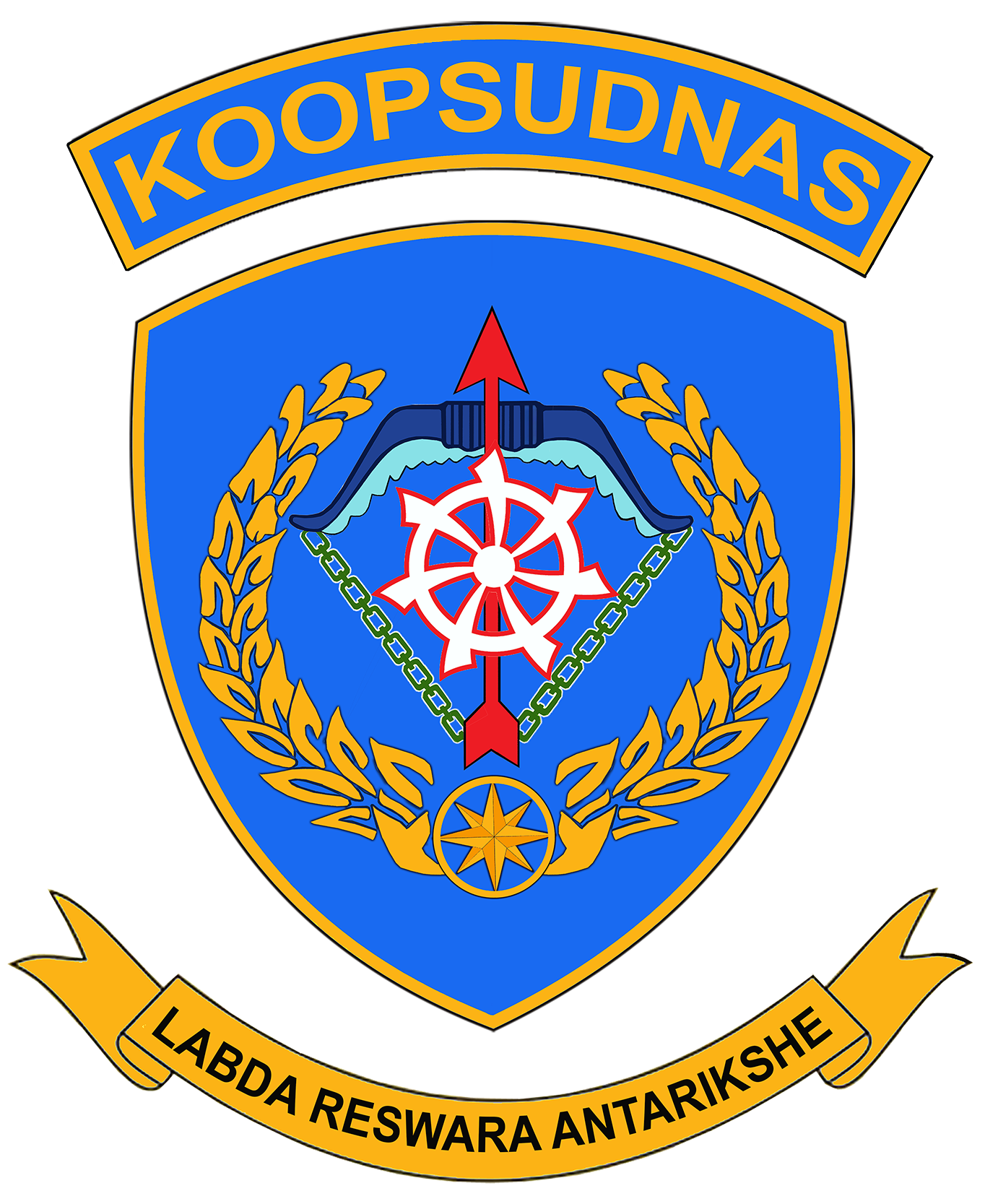
- Insignia of Koopsudnas
- Active: 28 January 2022 - present
- Country: Indonesia
- Branch: Indonesian Air Force
- Type: Air Supremacy Command
- Role: Early-Warning Radar; Air Mobility; Air Strike
- Part of: Indonesian Air Force
- Mottos: Labda Reswara Antarikshe transl. 'The Mighty Conquer the Sky'
- Website: https://koopsudnas.tni-au.mil.id/

Commanders
- Commander: Air Marshall Tedi Rizalihadi
- Chief of Staff: Air Vice Marshall Donald Kasenda
- Inspector: Air Commodore Dodi Fernando
- Head of Expert Staff Group: Air Commodore Surya Chandra Siahaan
- Notable commanders: Col. Leo Wattimena; Col. Rudi Taran

The National Air Operation Command (Indonesian: Komando Operasi Udara Nasional / Koopsudnas) is one of the Principal Operational Commands of the Indonesian Air Force that is responsible for air operations including air surveillance, early warning system, air supremacy, and air defense of Indonesian airspace. Koopsudnas plays a vital part for air defense capability of the Republic of Indonesia. This command is held by a three-star air force marshal.

== History ==
=== History of Air Force Operation Commands ===
Air Force Operation Command were established 1951 with Air Cdre Ruslan Danurusamsi as its first commander. In 1976, the Command was renamed into Combined Air Combat Command. In 1985, as part of a major reorganization of the armed forces, the Command was split into Air Operation Command (Komando Operasi Udara or Koopsud) 1 and 2 to oversee supervision over all regional air bases and air force formations within Indonesia on the basis of the Air Regions. On 11 May 2018, Air Operation Command 3 was officially formed on the basis of the Air Operation Command 2 bases in eastern Indonesia.

On 10 August 2025, the nomenclature for the Air Operation Commands was renamed to Air Force Regional Commands (Komando Daerah Angkatan Udara or Kodau).

=== History of National Air Operation Command ===
On 28 January 2022, the National Air Defense Command (Kohanudnas) was liquidated and alongside the Air Operation Command 1, 2, and 3 were officially merged into one organization, the National Air Operation Command (Komando Operasi Udara Nasional or Koopsudnas). The unified service serves as an umbrella institution managing all air defense and superiority operations under the Air Force, and thus simplifying the chain of command. The Koopsudnas is led by an Air Marshal.

On 10 August 2025, the National Air Defense Command (Kohanudnas) was re-established as an independent unit from the National Air Operation Command.

The National Air Operation Command Space Unit (Satuan Antariksa Koopsudnas) was established on 29 January 2026. The Space Unit was created in response to modern threats in outer space domain and to exploit its importance to command and control, operational decision making, and communication.

== Organization ==
- Command HQ
- 1st Air Force Regional Command (Komando Daerah Angkatan Udara 1)
- 2nd Air Force Regional Command (Komando Daerah Angkatan Udara 2)
- 3rd Air Force Regional Command (Komando Daerah Angkatan Udara 3)
- Air Force Operation Command (Komando Operasi Angkatan Udara)
- National Air Operation Command Space Unit (Satuan Antariksa Koopsudnas)

=== Air Force Regional Commands ===
The Air Force Regional Commands (Komando Daerah Angkatan Udara) is led by a two-star Air Vice-Marshal who oversees the air force bases. Each Air Force Base is divided based on function into 2 types, namely, headquarters air base and operational air base. Meanwhile, based on the area and completeness of the facilities, it is divided into 3 types, namely type A, type B and type C.

1st Air Force Regional Command
| Type A | Type B/C |
|---|---|
| Halim Perdanakusuma (HLM), Jakarta; Atang Senjaya (ATS), Bogor; Roesmin Nurjadin (RSN), Pekanbaru; Supadio (SPO), Pontianak; Suyadarma (SDM), Subang; Raden Sadjad (RSA), Natuna; Husein Sastranegara (HSN), Bandung; Soewondo (SWO), Medan | Sultan Iskandar Muda (SIM), Banda Aceh (B); Sutan Sjahrir (SUT), Padang (B); Sri Mulyono Herlambang (SMH), Palembang (B); Raja Haji Fisabilillah (RHF), Tanjungpinang (B); Pangeran M. Bunyamin (BNY), Tulang Bawang (B); Sulaiman (id) (SLM), Margahayu (B); Wiriadinata (WIR), Tasikmalaya (B); Maimun Saleh (MUS), Sabang (C); Hang Nadim (HNM), Batam (C); Haji Abdullah Sanusi Hanandjoeddin (ASH), Belitung (C); Gorda (GRD), Serang (C); Rumpin (RPN), Rumpin (C); Sugiri Sukani (id) (SKI), Majalengka (C); Harry Hadisoemantri (id) (HAD), Bengkayang (C); Iskandar (IKR), Pangkalan Bun (C) |
2nd Air Force Regional Command
| Type A | Type B/C |
| Abdul Rachman Saleh (ABD), Malang; Iswahjudi (IWJ), Madiun; Sultan Hasanuddin (HND), Makassar; Anang Busra (ANB), Tarakan; El Tari (ELI), Kupang; Sam Ratulangi (SRI), Manado | Muljono (MUL), Surabaya (B); Dhomber (DMB), Balikpapan (B); I Gusti Ngurah Rai (RAI), Denpasar (B); Muhammad Zainuddin Abdul Madjid (ZAM), Mataram (B); Syamsuddin Noor (SAM), Banjarmasin (B); Haluoleo (HLO), Kendari (B); General Soedirman (JBS), Purbalingga (C) |
3rd Air Force Regional Command
| Type A | Type B/C |
| Manuhua (MNA), Biak; Silas Papare (SPR), Jayapura | Johannes Abraham Dimara (DMA), Merauke (B); Yohanis Kapiyau (YKU), Timika (B); Pattimura (PTM), Ambon (B); Leo Wattimena (LWM), Morotai (B); Dominicus Dumatubun (DMN), Tual (C); Ignatius Dewanto (DWT), Tanimbar (C) |

Airbase type: Type A airbase Type B airbase Type C airbase

=== Air Force Operation Command ===
The Air Force Operation Command (Komando Operasi Angkatan Udara) is led by a two-star Air Vice-Marshal who oversees the Air Groups and Sector Commands, both leads by a one-star Air Commodore. Air Groups divided into Air Wings and Air Squadrons, while Sector Commands divided into Radar Units and Missile Units. Apart from maintenance matters, Air Squadrons and their subordinate units may move from headquarter airbase to operation airbase in certain operations during combat exercises or warfare.

Air Force Operation Command
| Commands | | Subordinate | |
|---|---|---|---|
| 1st Sector Command (West) Medan, North Sumatra | | 101st Radar Unit - Sabang, Aceh; 102nd Radar Unit - Lhokseumawe, Aceh; 103rd Radar Unit - Sibolga, North Sumatra; 104th Radar Unit - Dumai, Riau; 105th Radar Unit - Bengkulu City, Bengkulu; 106th Radar Unit - Tanjung Pinang, Riau Islands; 107th Radar Unit - Tanjung Pandan, Bangka Belitung Islands | |
| 2nd Sector Command (North) Makassar, South Sulawesi | | 201st Radar Unit - Ranai, Riau Islands; 202nd Radar Unit - Singkawang, West Kalimantan; 203rd Radar Unit - Putussibau, West Kalimantan; 204th Radar Unit - Tarakan, North Kalimantan; 205th Radar Unit - Balikpapan, East Kalimantan; 206th Radar Unit - Banjarbaru, South Kalimantan; 207th Radar Unit - Kwandang, Gorontalo; 208th Radar Unit - Takalar, South Sulawesi; 209th Radar Unit - Bombana, Southeast Sulawesi | |
| 3rd Sector Command (East) Biak, Papua | | 301st Radar Unit - Tanjung Warari, Biak Numfor Regency, Papua; 302nd Radar Unit - Timika, Mimika Regency, Central Papua; 303rd Radar Unit - Merauke, South Papua; 304th Radar Unit - Jayapura, Papua; 305th Radar Unit - Sorong, Southwest Papua; 306th Radar Unit - Morotai, North Maluku; 307th Radar Unit - Ambon, Maluku; 308th Radar Unit - Saumlaki, Maluku; 309th Radar Unit - Buraen, East Nusa Tenggara; 310th Radar Unit - Alor, East Nusa Tenggara | |
| 4th Sector Command (South) Jakarta | | 401st Radar Unit - Tangerang City, Banten; 402nd Radar Unit - Cibalimbing, West Java; 403rd Radar Unit - Tegal, Central Java; 404th Radar Unit - Congot, Yogyakarta; 405th Radar Unit - Ploso, East Java; 406th Radar Unit - Ngliyep, East Java; 407th Radar Unit - Tambolaka, East Nusa Tenggara; 421th Missile Unit - Teluknaga, Banten | |
| Air Groups | Air Wings | Air Squadrons | Aircraft |
| 1st Air Group (Transport) | 11th Air Wing Jakarta | 2nd Air Squadron, Jakarta | CN295M; CN295 Special Mission |
| 1st Air Group (Transport) | 11th Air Wing Jakarta | 17th Air Squadron, Jakarta | Boeing 737; Boeing Business Jet |
| 1st Air Group (Transport) | 11th Air Wing Jakarta | 18th Air Squadron, Jakarta | Falcon 8X |
| 1st Air Group (Transport) | 11th Air Wing Jakarta | 31st Air Squadron, Jakarta | A400M MRTT; L-100-30; C-130H-30; C-130J-30 |
| 1st Air Group (Transport) | 12th Air Wing Malang | 4th Air Squadron, Malang | NC212 |
| 1st Air Group (Transport) | 12th Air Wing Malang | 32nd Air Squadron, Malang | C-130B / H; KC-130B |
| 1st Air Group (Transport) | 13th Air Wing Biak | 27th Air Squadron, Biak | CN235; CN235 MPA |
| 1st Air Group (Transport) | 13th Air Wing Biak | 33rd Air Squadron, Makassar | C-130H |
| 2nd Air Group (Helicopter) | 21st Air Wing Bogor | 6th Air Squadron, Bogor | NAS 332C1 / L1 |
| 2nd Air Group (Helicopter) | 21st Air Wing Bogor | 8th Air Squadron, Bogor | EC725 / H225M |
| 2nd Air Group (Helicopter) | 21st Air Wing Bogor | Search and Rescue Air Unit, Bogor | AS365 N3+; AW139; NBO 105 |
| 2nd Air Group (Helicopter) | 22nd Air Wing Subang | 7th Air Squadron, Subang | EC120B |
| 2nd Air Group (Helicopter) | 22nd Air Wing Subang | 45th Air Squadron, Jakarta | NAS 332L1; AW101 |
| 2nd Air Group (Helicopter) | 23rd Air Wing Jayapura | 9th Air Squadron, Jayapura | |
| 3rd Air Group (Combat) | 31st Air Wing Pekanbaru | 1st Air Squadron, Pontianak | Hawk 109; Hawk 209 |
| 3rd Air Group (Combat) | 31st Air Wing Pekanbaru | 12th Air Squadron, Pekanbaru | Rafale C / B F4 |
| 3rd Air Group (Combat) | 31st Air Wing Pekanbaru | 16th Air Squadron, Pekanbaru | F-16C / D |
| 3rd Air Group (Combat) | 32nd Air Wing Madiun | 3rd Air Squadron, Madiun | F-16AM / BM |
| 3rd Air Group (Combat) | 32nd Air Wing Madiun | 14th Air Squadron, Madiun | F-16C / D |
| 3rd Air Group (Combat) | 32nd Air Wing Madiun | 15th Air Squadron, Madiun | T-50i |
| 3rd Air Group (Combat) | 32nd Air Wing Madiun | 21st Air Squadron, Malang | EMB 314 |
| 3rd Air Group (Combat) | 33rd Air Wing Makassar | 11th Air Squadron, Makassar | Su-27SK / SKM; Su-30MK / MK2 |
| 3rd Air Group (Combat) | 33rd Air Wing Makassar | 19th Air Squadron, Kendari | |
| 4th Air Group (Special) | 41st Air Wing Pontianak | 51st Air Squadron | Anka-S |
| 4th Air Group (Special) | 41st Air Wing Pontianak | 52nd Air Squadron, Natuna | CH-4B |
| 4th Air Group (Special) | 41st Air Wing Pontianak | 53rd Air Squadron, Tarakan | |
| 4th Air Group (Special) | 41st Air Wing Pontianak | 54th Air Squadron, Malang | |
| 4th Air Group (Special) | 41st Air Wing Pontianak | 55th Air Squadron, Kupang | |
| 4th Air Group (Special) | 41st Air Wing Pontianak | 56th Air Squadron, Madiun | |
| 4th Air Group (Special) | 42nd Air Wing Makassar | 5th Air Squadron, Makassar | Boeing 737-2X9 Surveiller |
| 4th Air Group (Special) | 42nd Air Wing Makassar | New Air Squadron | |

Italics indicate under construction and denotes planned unit but not yet activated.

== See also ==
- Indonesian National Armed Forces
- Indonesian Air Force
