= 16th Air Squadron =

- Skadron Udara 16
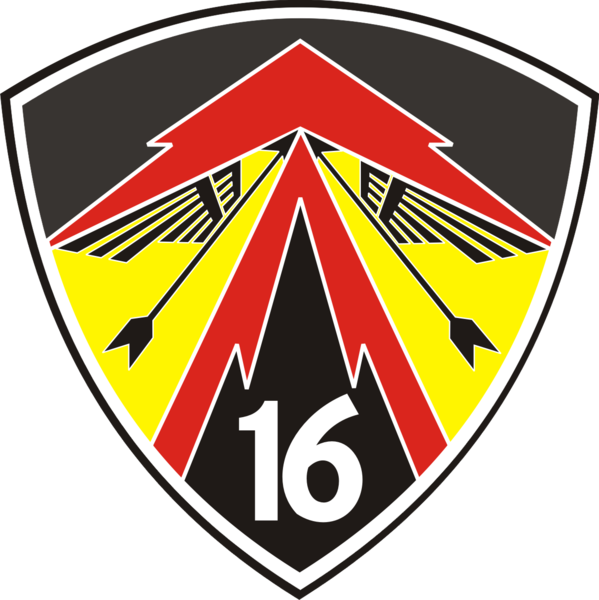
- 16th Air Squadron Badge
- Active: 17 October 2014
- Country: Indonesia
- Branch: Indonesian Air Force
- Type: Fighter
- Part of: 31st Air Wing
- Garrison/HQ: Roesmin Nurjadin Air Force Base
- Nicknames: Rydders (Pilots); Rubicon (Groundcrews)
- Mottos: "Vijayakantaka Abhyasti Virayate" lit. 'A superior and mighty warrior of victory' (Excel and Valiant)
- Website: https://www.instagram.com/skadronudara16/

Commanders
- Current commander: Maj. Anugrah Gigih Pratama

Insignia
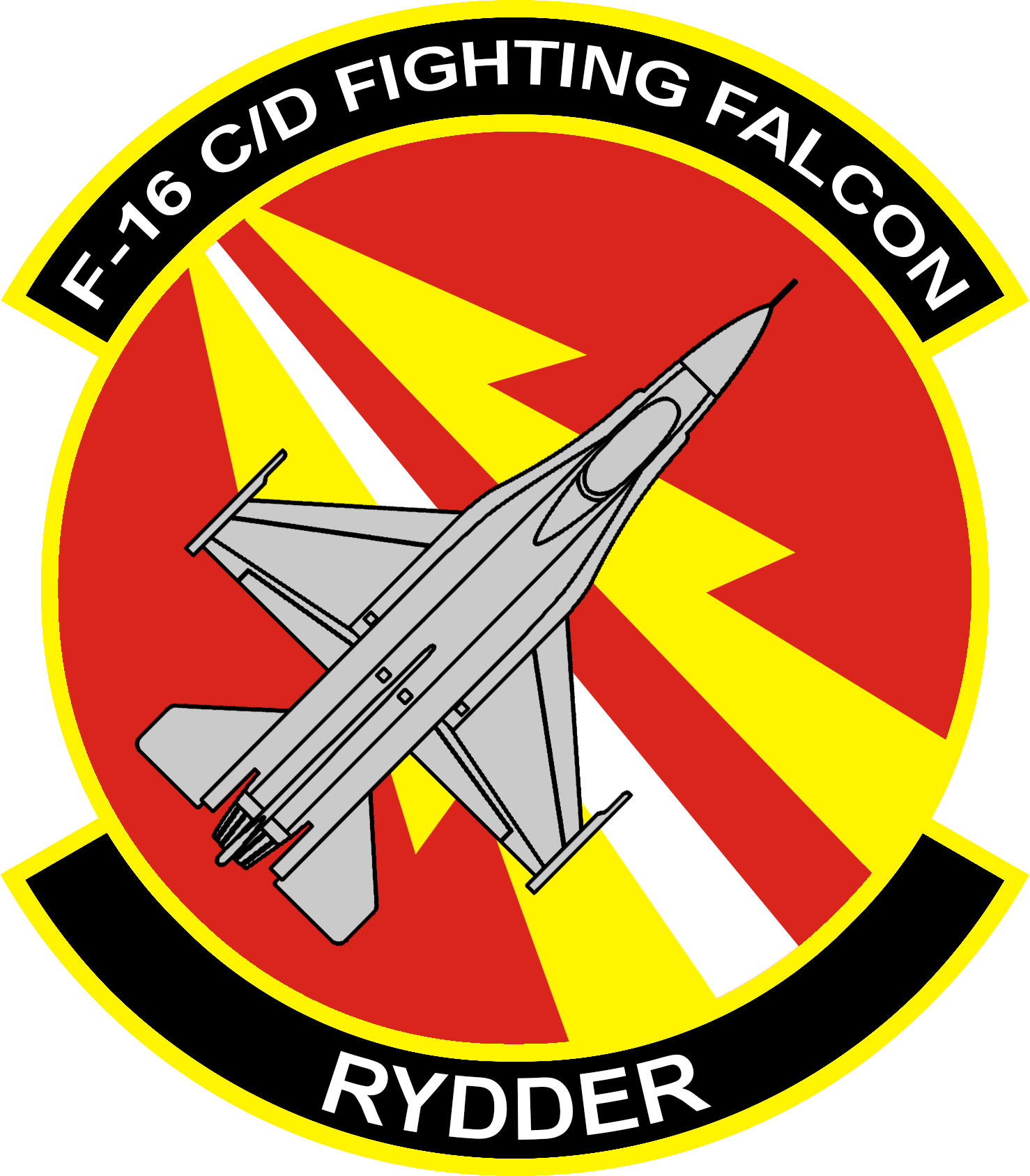
- 16th Air Squadron's Patch

Aircraft flown
- Fighter: General Dynamics F-16C/D Fighting Falcon

16th Air Squadron (Indonesian: Skadron Udara 16 or Skadud 16 or SkU 16) is a fighter squadron under the command of the 31st Air Wing based in Roesmin Nurjadin Air Force Base, Pekanbaru. The 16th Air Squadron was inaugurated by the Indonesian president and Air Force Chief of Staff, Marshal Ida Bagus Putu Dunia on October 17, 2014. The 16th Air Squadron is one of Indonesia's three F-16 squadron. The 16th Air Squadron pilots have the callsign of Rydder meaning Knight, and for the groundcrews the callsign of Rubicon.

== History ==
=== F-16 grant from the US Government ===
See also: F-16 grant from the US Government

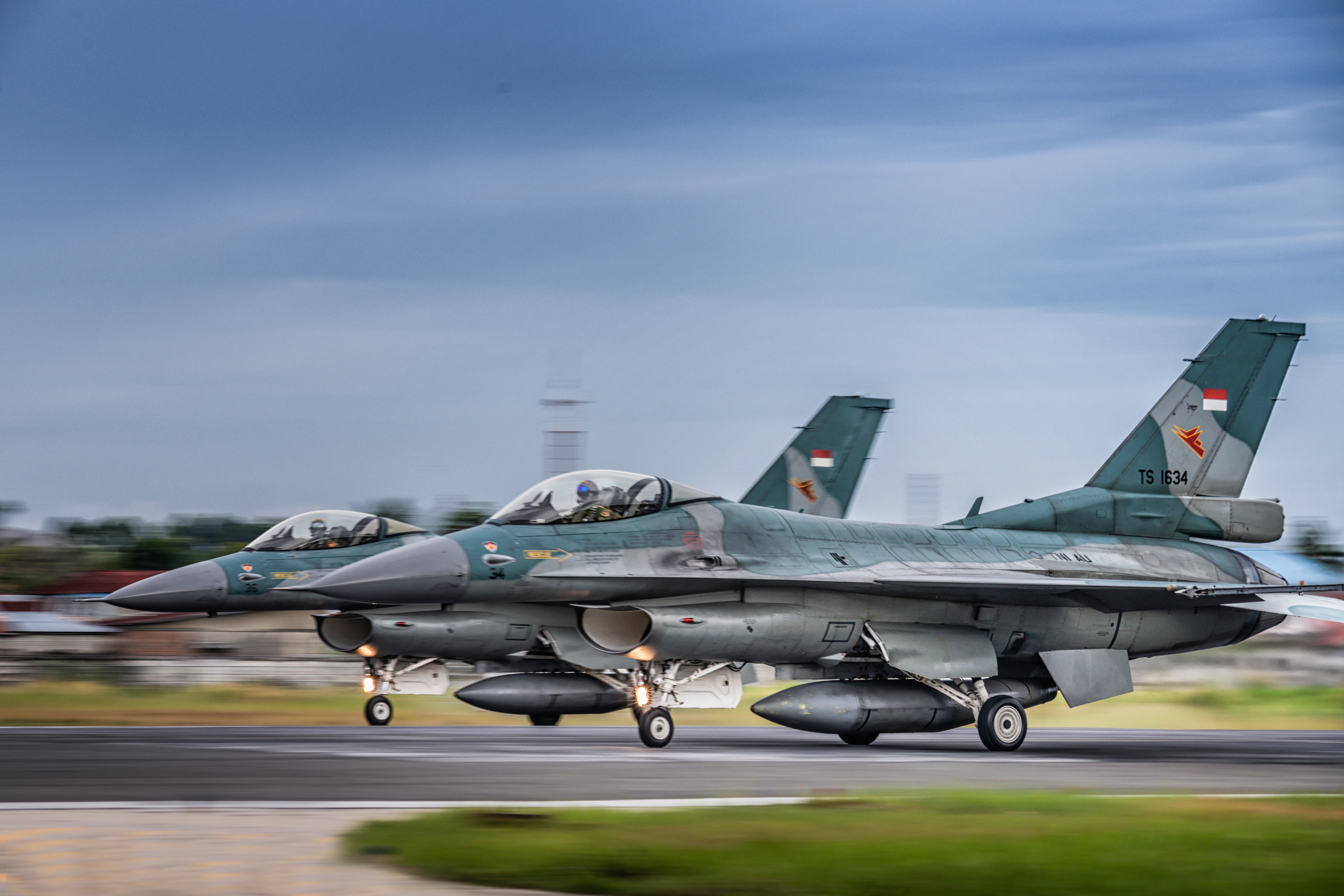
A couple of F-16Cs from the 16th Air Squadron (the 3rd Air Wing tail marking can be seen)

"Peace Bima Sena II" program was a program to acquire 24 Ex-USAF F-16C/D Fighting Falcon for the Indonesian Air Force in 2012-2018, In 2011 it was announced that Indonesia will acquire 24 regenerated ex-USAF F-16s along with spare parts, granted by the Obama administration, Indonesia pays under $750 Million for upgrades and regeneration, the program was named "Peace Bimasena II". The Hill Air Force Base's Ogden Air Logistics Complex located in Utah carried out the upgrades. The upgrades brought the F-16s up from the Block 25 to the Block 52 standard with the Indonesian press reporting an upgraded AN/APG-68 (V) fire control radar and Block 52 Link 16 datalink, AN/ALQ-213 Electronic Warfare Management System, ALR-69 Class IV Radar Warning Receiver, a Modular Mission Computer Version 5 and ALE-47 Countermeasures Dispenser Set. The Air Squadron uses the F-16C/D Block 52ID, also sometimes referred to as Block 25 Advanced

However one of the F-16 from this program, with tail number TS-1643 which was flown by Lieutenant Firman Dwi Cahyono exploded and burned during takeoff at Halim Perdanakusuma AFB in Jakarta.The pilot managed to escape and survived. TS-1643 is now on display at the 16th Air Squadron's base.

== Gallery ==
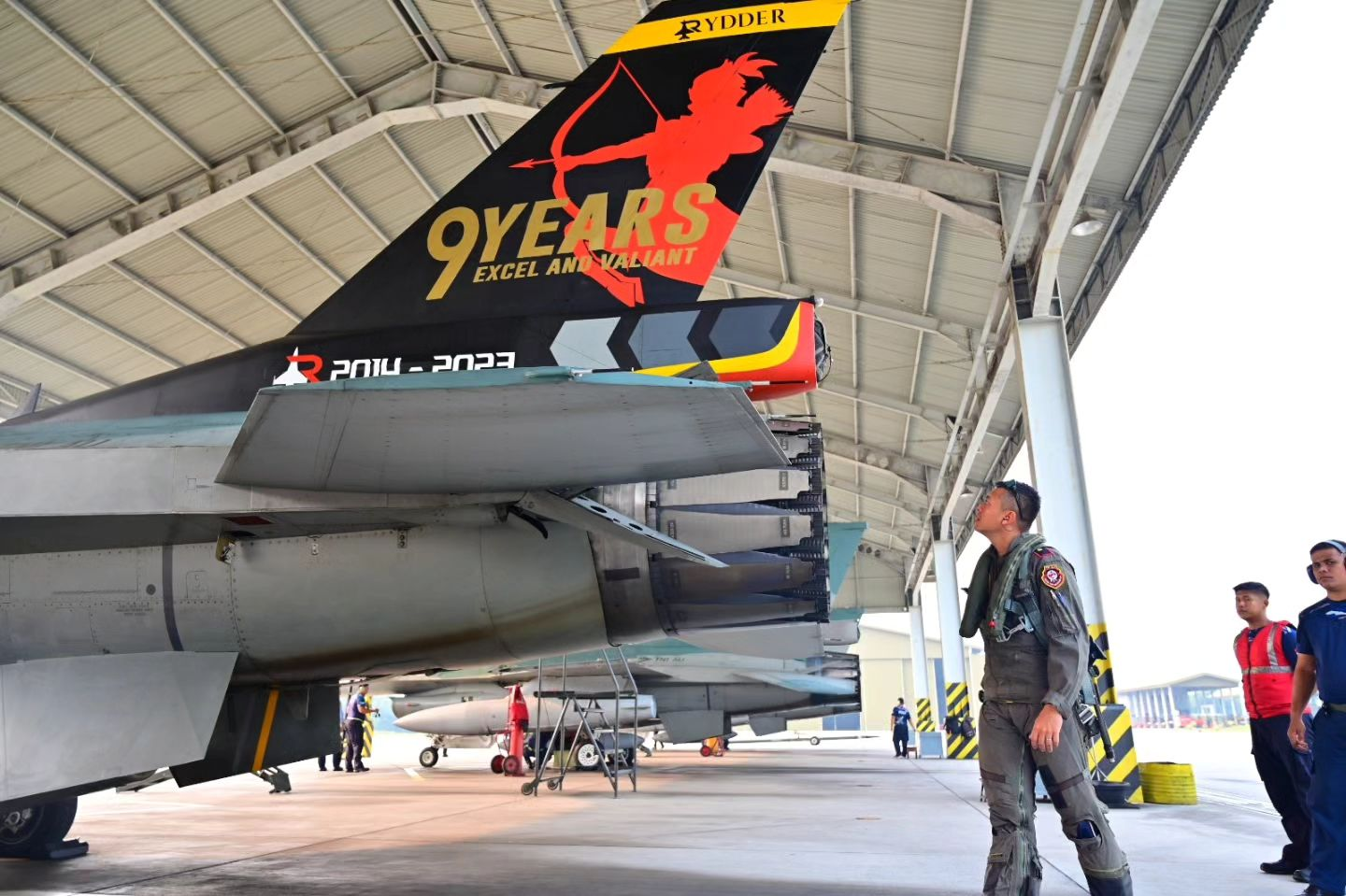
Close up of the 9th Anniversary tail art

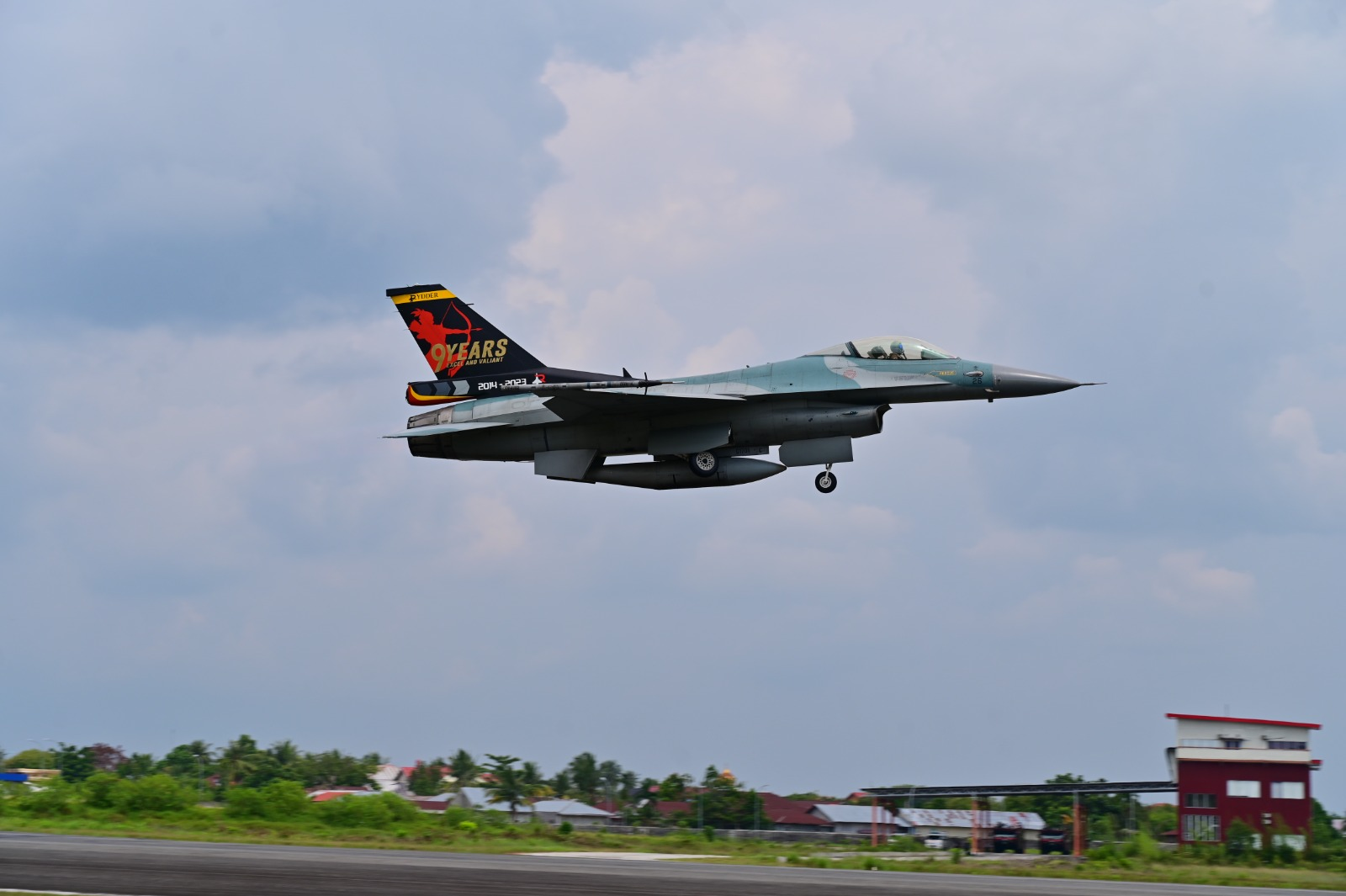
Tail Art for 9th Anniversary

== See also ==
- 3rd Air Wing, a Fighter Wing stationed in Iswahjudi AFB, Madiun.
- 3rd Air Squadron, an F-16AM/BM Fighter Squadron stationed in Iswahjudi AFB, Madiun.
- 14th Air Squadron, an F-16C/D Fighter Squadron also stationed in Iswahjudi AFB, Madiun.
- National Air Operations Command
