= 31st Air Squadron =

- Skadron Udara 31
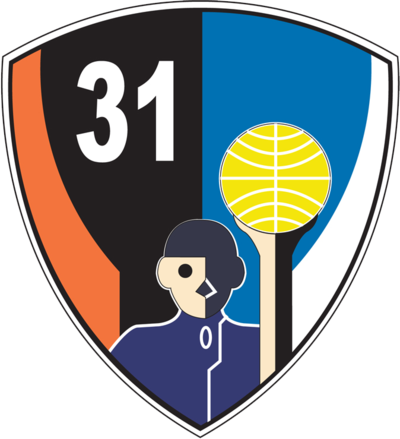
- 31st Air Squadron Badge
- Active: 4 April 1961–present
- Country: Indonesia
- Branch: Indonesian Air Force
- Type: Transport
- Role: Strategic/Tactical Airlift
- Part of: 1st Air Wing
- Garrison/HQ: Halim Perdanakusuma Air Force Base
- Nickname: "Rajawali"
- Mottos: "Kshatra Abhimana Anuraga" (Prestigious yet humble warrior)
- Engagements: Operation Trikora; Operation Lotus; Offensive in Aceh

Aircraft flown
- Transport: Lockheed Martin C-130J Super Hercules; Lockheed C-130H/HS; L-100-30

The 31st Air Squadron (Indonesian: Skadron Udara 31) is an airlift squadron under the command of the 1st Air Wing based in Halim Perdanakusuma Air Force Base, Jakarta. It is tasked with being a heavy transport squadron. The legal basis for the 31st Air Squadron is Minister of the Air Force Decree Number 433 dated 1 January 1960 concerning the formation of the C-130B Hercules heavy transport experimental squadron which was later transformed into 31st Air Squadron of long-distance heavy transport which was determined by Minister of the Air Force on 4 April 1961. Logo (badge) of 31st Air Squadron ratified through Minister of the Air Force Decree Number 109, dated 19 February 1962.

== History ==
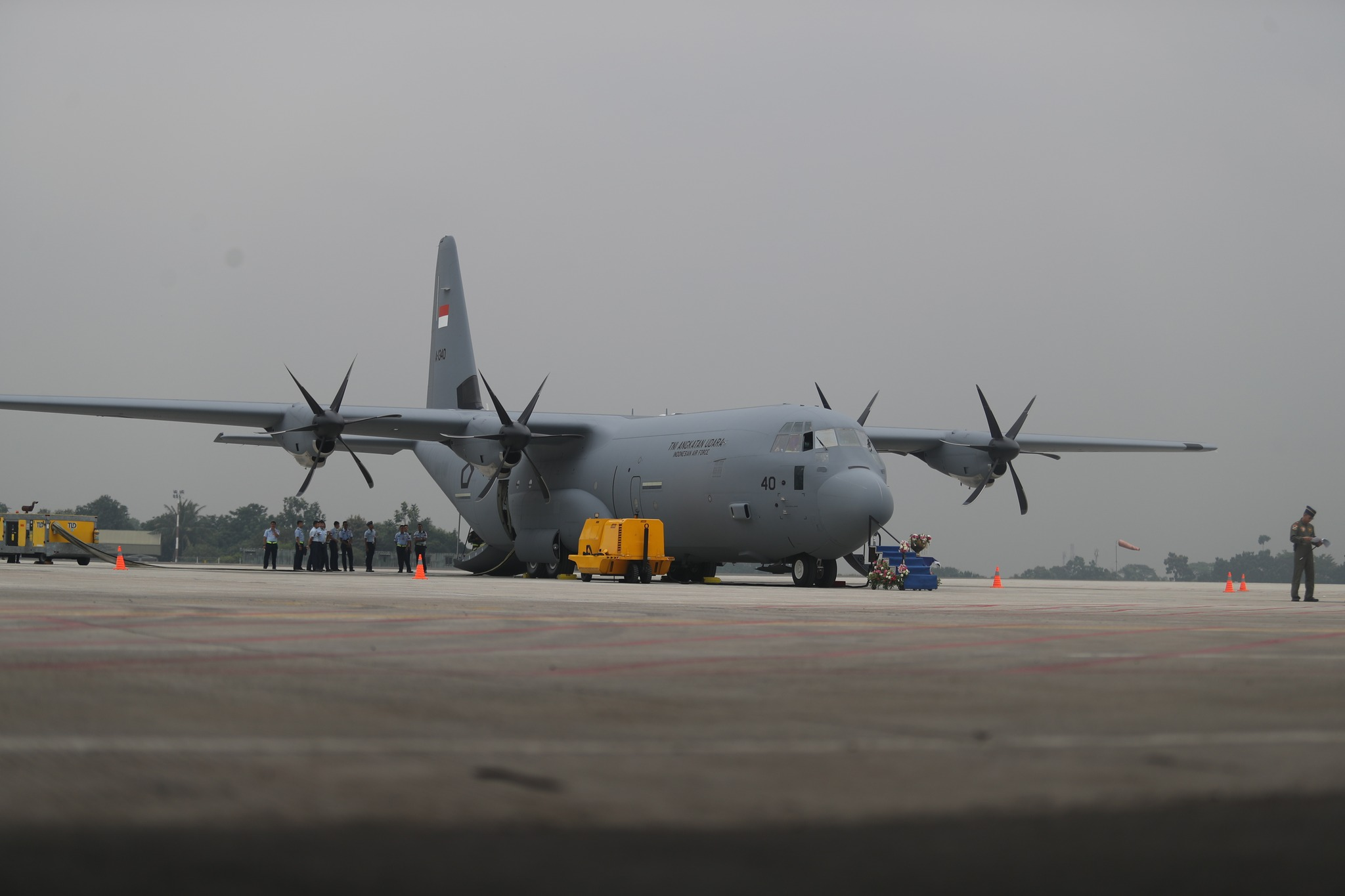
Indonesian Air Force C-130J (A-1340) of the 31st Air Squadron

On April 4, 1961 Minister/Commander of the Air Force Air Admiral Soerjadi Soejadarma inaugurated the establishment of the 31st Air Squadron Long Range Heavy Transport, with a strength of 10 C-130B Hercules aircraft based at Halim Perdanakusuma Air Force Base. Air Major Susanto was appointed as Commander of the 31st Air Squadron. Previously, on June 1, 1960 the Minister/Commander of the Air Force had formed the C-130B Hercules Heavy Transport Aircraft Experimental Squadron through Ministerial/Commander Decree Number 433 with a strength of 5 C-130B Hercules aircraft. This Experimental Squadron was based at Kemayoran Air Force Base because at that time Halim Perdanakusuma Air Force Base still did not have adequate facilities to serve as a "home base" for the C-130B Hercules aircraft, so facilities/facilities and other support needed to be prepared in advance.

Now, the 31st Air Squadron is strengthened by the C-130J Super Hercules Heavy Transport Aircraft, the latest variant of the C-130 Hercules which is known for being up-to-date with the latest technology. The Indonesian Air Force has previously ordered 5 C-130J units with the C-130J-30 variant. On 16 May 2024, all 5 C-130J-30 units have arrived and inaugurated into the 31st Air Squadron, 1st Air Wing, Halim Perdanakusuma Air Force Base.

On 9 April 2024, the 31st Air Squadron was involved in humanitarian mission dropping packages of aid comprising food, mineral water, and medicines in Palestine.
