= Atang Sendjaja Air Force Base =

Military airport in Bogor, West Java, Indonesia

Atang Sendjaja Air Force Base Pangkalan Udara (Lanud) Atang Sendjaja
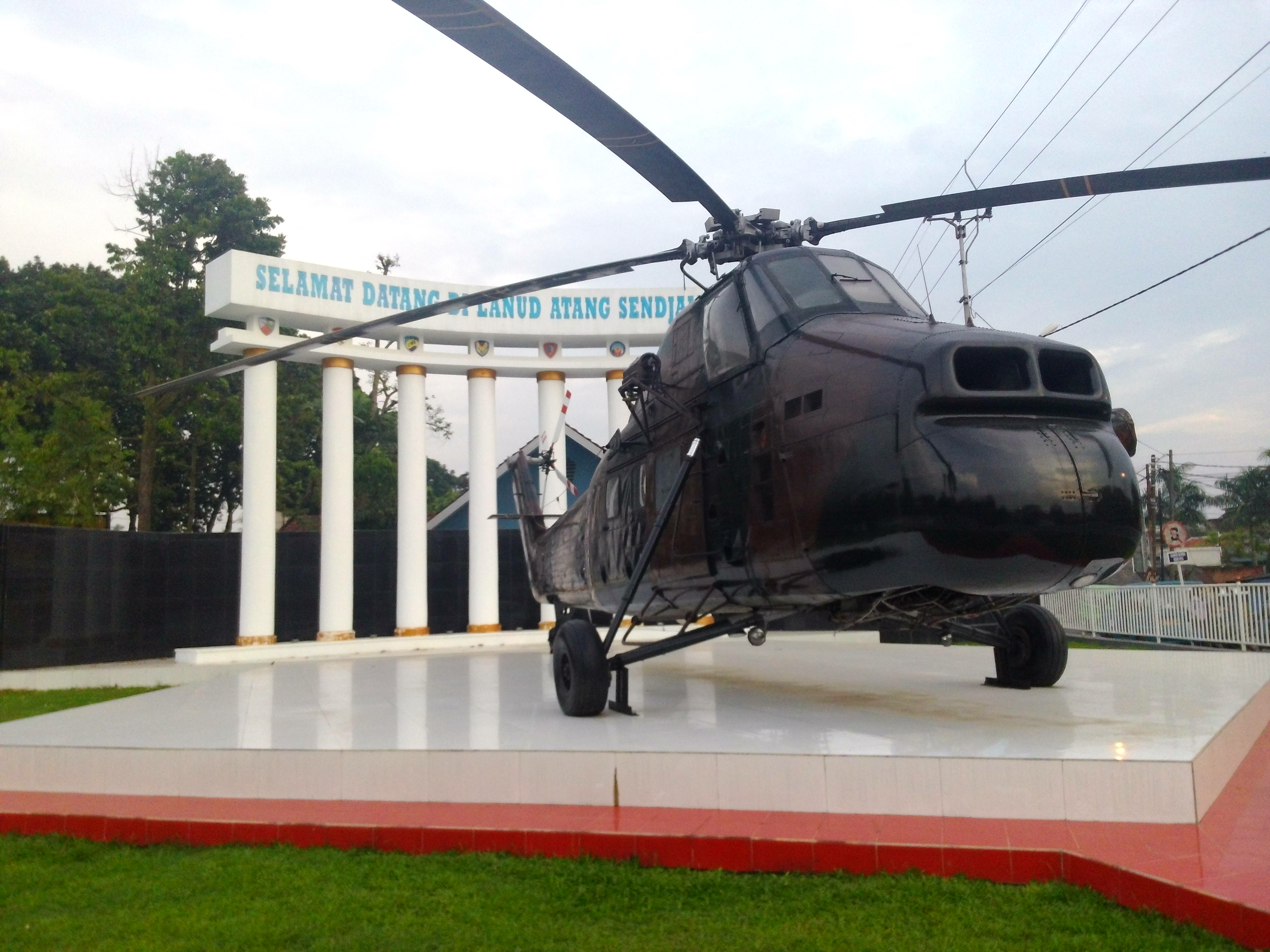
- IATA: none; ICAO: WIHJ

Summary
- Airport type: Military
- Owner: Indonesian Air Force
- Operator: Indonesian Air Force
- Location: Atang Senjaya, Kemang, Bogor Regency, West Java, Indonesia
- Elevation AMSL: 538 ft (164 m)
- Coordinates: 06°32′20″S 106°45′19″E

Map
- Location in Bogor Regency Location in Indonesia

Runways
Direction	Length		Surface
Direction	m	ft	Surface
02/20	1,400	4,593	grass
- Source: gcmap.com

Atang Sendjaja or Atang Senjaya Air Force Base (ICAO: WIHJ) is a small airbase operated by the Indonesian Air Force. Located in Kemang, Bogor Regency, West Java, Indonesia, this airport has a single runway lane of 1.400 m. The airbase is named after Atang Sendjaja, an Indonesian Air Force helicopter pilot. It is one of only two airbases used exclusively by the Indonesian Air Force, the other being Iswahjudi Air Force Base.

The airbase houses two of the four Indonesian Air Force helicopter squadrons, as well as the Search and Rescue Air Unit.
