= 3rd Air Squadron =

- Skadron Udara 3
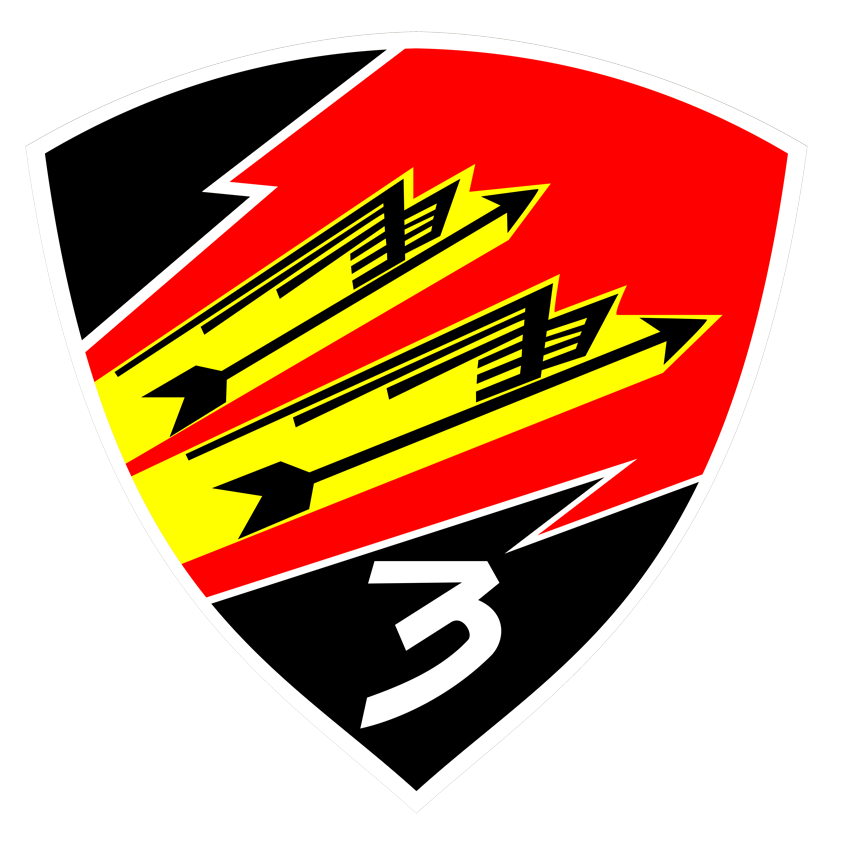
- 3rd Air Squadron Badge
- Active: 21 March 1951–present
- Country: Indonesia
- Branch: Indonesian Air Force
- Type: Fighter
- Part of: 3rd Air Wing
- Garrison/HQ: Iswahjudi Air Force Base
- Nicknames: Dragons; Falcon Ground (Ground Crews)
- Mottos: "Uruvikrama Ghataka" (Valiant and Deadly)
- Engagements: Darul Islam Rebellion; Permesta Rebellion; Konfrontasi; Operation Trikora; Operation Lotus; Offensive in Aceh
- Website: tni-au.mil.id/portfolio/skadron-3/

Commanders
- Current commander: Lt. Col. Anwar Sovie

Insignia
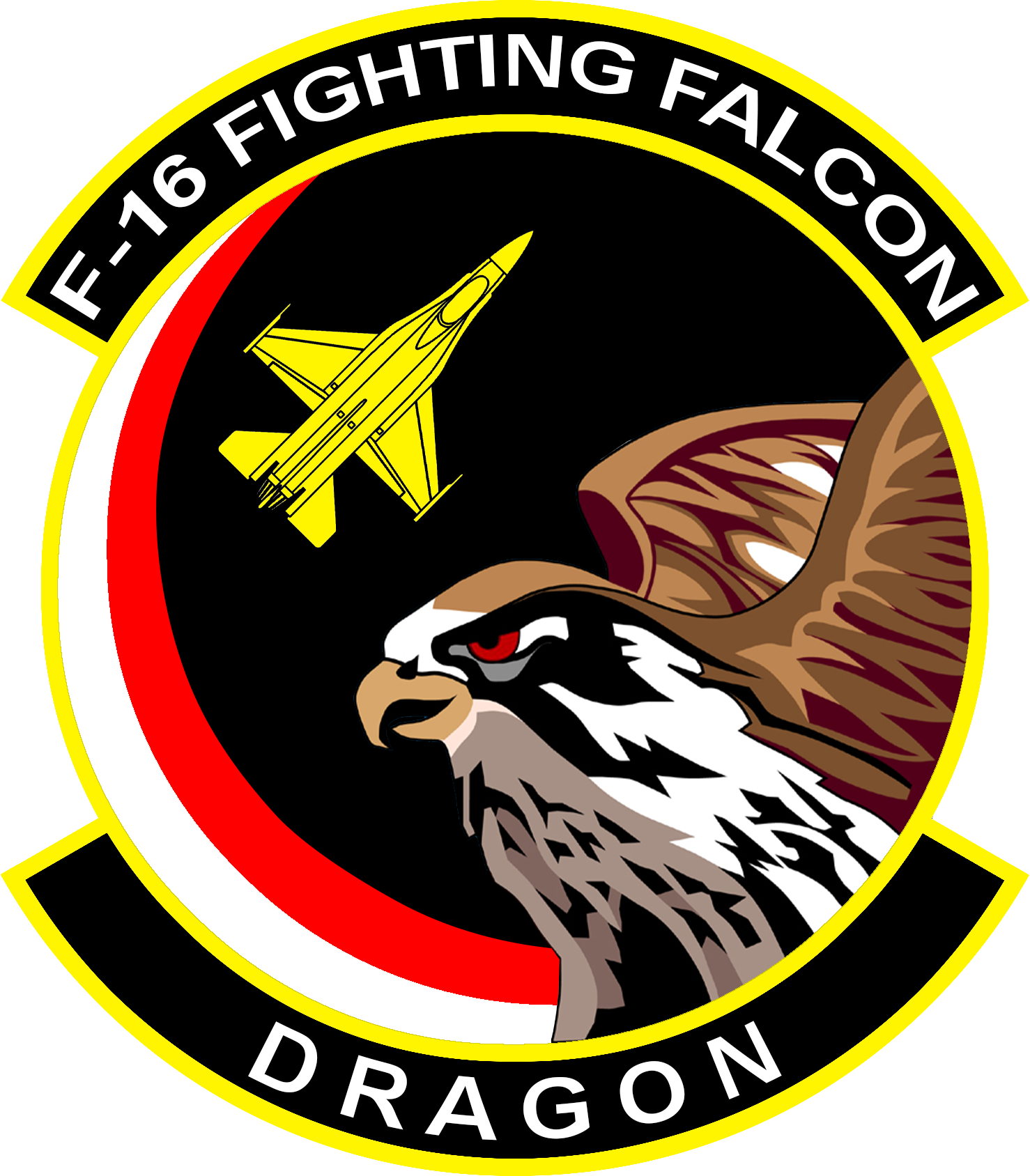
- 3rd Air Squadron's Patch

Aircraft flown
- Fighter: General Dynamics F-16AM/BM Fighting Falcon

3rd Air Squadron (Indonesian: Skadron Udara 3 or Skadud 3 or SkU 3) is a Fighter Squadron of the Indonesian Air Force (TNI-AU) under the command of the 3rd Air Wing, headquartered in Iswahjudi Air Force Base.

The 3rd Air Squadron is one of the oldest squadrons and the 3rd squadron formed by President Sukarno on March 21, 1951.

Aircraft flown by the 3rd Air Squadron are, P-51D Mustang (1950 - 1975), OV-10F Bronco (1976 - 1989), F-16A/B Fighting Falcon (1989 - 2020) F-16C/D Fighting Falcon (2014 - 2022) and now operating F-16AM/BM Fighting Falcon since 2020 (upgraded F-16A/B).

== OV-10 Bronco ==
The OV-10 Bronco started her service in Indonesia on 28 September 1976 when 16 OV-10Fs replaced 3rd Air Squadron's P-51D Mustang.

The OV-10 saw combat in East Timor where it was used as attack aircraft, some OV-10s were piloted by American pilots in bombing raids against Fretilin.

In 1990, the Bronco was reassigned to the 1st Air Squadron and to the 21st Air Squadron later, while the new F-16s were assigned to 3rd Air Squadron. After a fatal crash in 2007, all OV-10 were retired and replaced by EMB-314 Super Tucano.

== F-16 Fighting Falcon ==
The Indonesian F-16A/B procurement program was named the "Peace Bima Sena I". Four F-5 Tiger II Pilots Lt. Col. Wartoyo (Marsdya TNI), Major Basri Sidehabi (Marsdya TNI), Major Eris Herryanto (Marsdya TNI), and Major Rodi Suprasojo (Marsda TNI).

Those who had more than 1,000 flying hours departed Indonesia at the end of 1988. They went to the US to receive education and training on the characteristics and uniqueness of aircraft, maneuvers, how to fly, and education to become instructors for the F-16 Fighting Falcon. Apart from the four pilots, 63 technicians also departed after going through the selection process.

The first 2 F-16 landed at Iswahyudi on December 11, 1989, after going through a long and tiring journey from the manufacturing plant in Fort Worth, Dallas. The total number of F-16A/B block 15 Operational Capabilities Upgrade (OCU) aircraft owned by the Indonesian Air Force is 12 aircraft. The first pilot conversions opened five months later in April 1990 and by 1999, the 3rd squadron had 31 F-16 pilots.

The 3rd Air Squadron is involved in the 2003–2004 Indonesian offensive in Aceh. F-16s were deployed as a 'Shock Therapy' where the F-16s would fly low over enemy positions at a high speed as a show of force.

3rd squadron took part in various air defense operations, operational command level exercises, force level exercises and joint exercises. Joint exercises that have been carried out are Pitch Black exercise in Australia, Elang Thainesia with Thailand, Elang Ausindo with Australia, Cope West with US PACAF, Elang Malindo with Malaysia and Elang Indopura with Singapore as well as visits to friendly countries such as Thailand, Singapore and Australia.

=== F-16 grant from the US Government ===
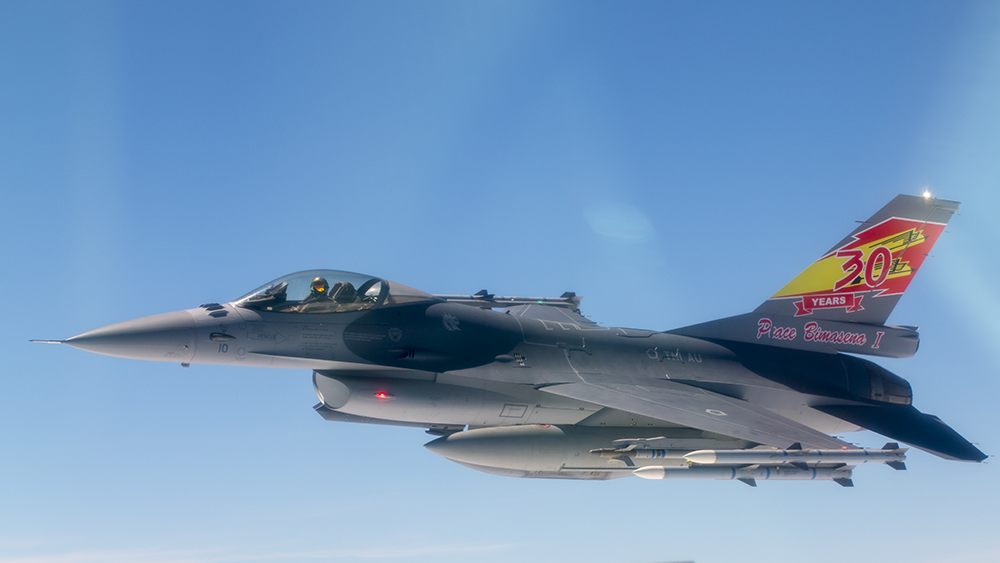
3rd squadron's F-16AM after Falcon STAR and Enhanced Midlife Upgrade of the F-16s from Peace Bimasena I with tail art to commemorate the program, the upgrade conducted in Indonesia by the 042nd Technical Squadron.

In 2011 it was announced that Indonesia will acquire 24 regenerated ex-USAF F-16s along with spare parts, donated by the Obama administration, Indonesia pays under $750 Million for upgrades and regeneration, the program was named "Peace Bimasena II".

The upgrades brought the F-16s up from the Block 25 to the Block 52 standard, this includes upgraded AN/APG-68 (V) fire control radar and Block 52 Link 16 datalink, AN/ALQ-213 Electronic Warfare Management System, ALR-69 Class IV Radar Warning Receiver, a Modular Mission Computer Version 5 and ALE-47 Countermeasures Dispenser Set.

The regenerated F-16s consisted of 19 single seat C variant and 5 double seat D variant delivered to Iswahjudi Air Force Base on July 20, 2014, from Hill Air Force Base in Utah, stopping in Guam, Hawaii, Alaska and refueled numerous time in the air. 16 of the F-16s placed in 16th Air Squadron based in Pekanbaru and 8 F-16 were placed in the 3rd Squadron, however since September 2022, all F-16C/D from the 3rd Air Squadron were moved to the 14th Air Squadron based in Iswahjudi to fill gap in the squadron, this also include some F-16s from the 16th Air Squadron.

The first 3 F-16 under this program landed at Iswahjudi AFB on 25 July 2014.

=== Elang Biru aerobatic team ===
The Aerobatic Team Elang Biru or Blue Falcon was formed in 1994 and active in 1995. The team flies 6 F-16 from the 3rd squadron in a special blue and yellow livery with red and white stripes and is one of only 3 F-16 aerobatics team, the other being USAF Thunderbirds and RSAF Black Knights.

The Blue Falcon pilots were invited by USAF Thunderbirds aerobatic team to witness their performance at Singapore Airshow 1994, during the airshow, they had the opportunity to discuss with Thunderbirds pilots about their aerobatic training methods, from that discussion, they realized forming an aerobatic team is not easy. Regardless, preparations for the formation of the Blue Falcon aerobatic team were still being carried out by preparing six F-16, consisting of four aircraft as the main formation and two aircraft as solo aircraft.

By imitating the maneuvers of The Thunderbirds via video, the 3rd Air Squadron team practiced and studied the maneuvers that would be performed for four months. They made their first debut in April 1995 during the Air Force's 49th anniversary, then again in October 1995 during the TNI 50th anniversary, both were performed at Halim Air Force Base, they performed at Indonesian Air Show (IAS) in 1996 at Soekarno-Hatta International Airport, Jakarta. The team made its international debut in Singapore Air Show 1996.

To increase the ability and variation of aerobatics, in June 1995 they invited three Thunderbirds instructors, they were Major Peter McCaffrey (solo specialist), Captain Matthew E. Byrd (wing specialist) and Colonel Steve "boss" Trent, former Leader of The Thunderbirds. Unfortunately, the training could only be attended by four 3rd Air Squadron pilots, this is because one of the members went to the US to receive education and another were reassigned to the 14th Air Squadron to fly the F-5E/F Tiger II. After the training, they performed at the TNI 50th anniversary. Before they performed at Indonesian Air Show 1996, they performed at a small airshow in their base at Iswahyudi AFB.

The name Blue Falcon came from the aircraft they fly, the F-16 Fighting Falcon, while Blue is the color of the sky and the color that reflects the Air Force, Elang Biru is the Indonesianization of Blue Falcon. Unfortunately, the team only existed for just over 5 years as the team was disbanded in 2000.

In 2001 the team was merged with the Jupiter Aerobatics Team, forming Jupiter Blue. The team flies 2 F-16, 3 Hawk 53, and 1 Hawk 109. Now the team is known as the Jupiter Aerobatics Team and flies KT-1B trainer aircraft.

== Commanders ==
1. Lt. Col. P.G.O. "Drunken Dog" Noordraven
2. 1st Lt. Muljono (1950–1951)
3. 1st Lt. Hadi Supandi (1951–1953)
4. 2nd Lt. Roesmin Nurjadin (1953–1960)
5. Capt. Soemitro (1960–1962)
6. Capt. Loely Wardiman (1962–1963)
7. Capt. Sobirin Misbach (1963–1966)
8. Capt. Srijono (1966–1968)
9. Capt. I.G.N. Danendra (1968–1969)
10. Capt. Soeharso (1969–1971)
11. Capt. Rukandi (1971–1975)
12. Maj. Rusmali Arifin (1975–1978)
13. Maj. Soetedjo (1979–1983)
14. Maj. Tamtama Adi (1983–1987)
15. Maj. Sony Rizani (1987–1989)
16. Maj. Alimunsiri Rape (1989–1990)
17. Lt. Col. Wartoyo (1990–1992)
18. Lt. Col. Basri Sidehabi (1992–1994)
19. Lt. Col. Rodi "Cobra" Suprasodjo (1994–1996)
20. Lt. Col. Bambang "Puffin" Samoedro (1996–1999)
21. Lt. Col. Muhammad "Wild Geese" Syaugi (1999–2002)
22. Lt. Col. Tatang "Python" Harliansyah (2003–2004)
23. Lt. Col. Fachri "Oryx" Adamy (2004–2005)
24. Lt. Col. Andyawan "Sable" Martono Putra (2005–2006)
25. Lt. Col. Age "Hammer" Wiraksono (2006–2007)
26. Lt. Col. Fajar "Red Wolf" Adriyanto (2007–2009)
27. Lt. Col. Ian "Hyena" Fuady (2009–2011)
28. Lt. Col. Ali "Unicorn" Sudibyo" (2011–2012)
29. Lt. Col. "Gripen" Setiawan (2012–2014)
30. Lt. Col. Firman "Foxhound" Dwi Cahyono (2014-2014)
31. Lt. Col. Anjar "Beagle" Legowo (2014–2017)
32. Lt. Col. Gusti Made Yoga "Barong" Ambara (2017–2019)
33. Lt. Col. Agus "Wolverine" Dwi Ariyanto (2019–2021)
34. Lt. Col. Pandu "Hornet" Eka Prayoga (2021–2024)
35. Lt. Col. Anwar "Weasel" Sovie (2024–2026)
36. Lt. Col. Ferry "Rabbit" Rachman (2026–Present)

== See also ==
- 3rd Air Wing
- National Air Operations Command
- 16th Air Squadron
- 14th Air Squadron
