= Wiriadinata Airport =

Military airport in Tasikmalaya, West Java, Indonesia

Wiriadinata Airport Bandar Udara Wiriadinata
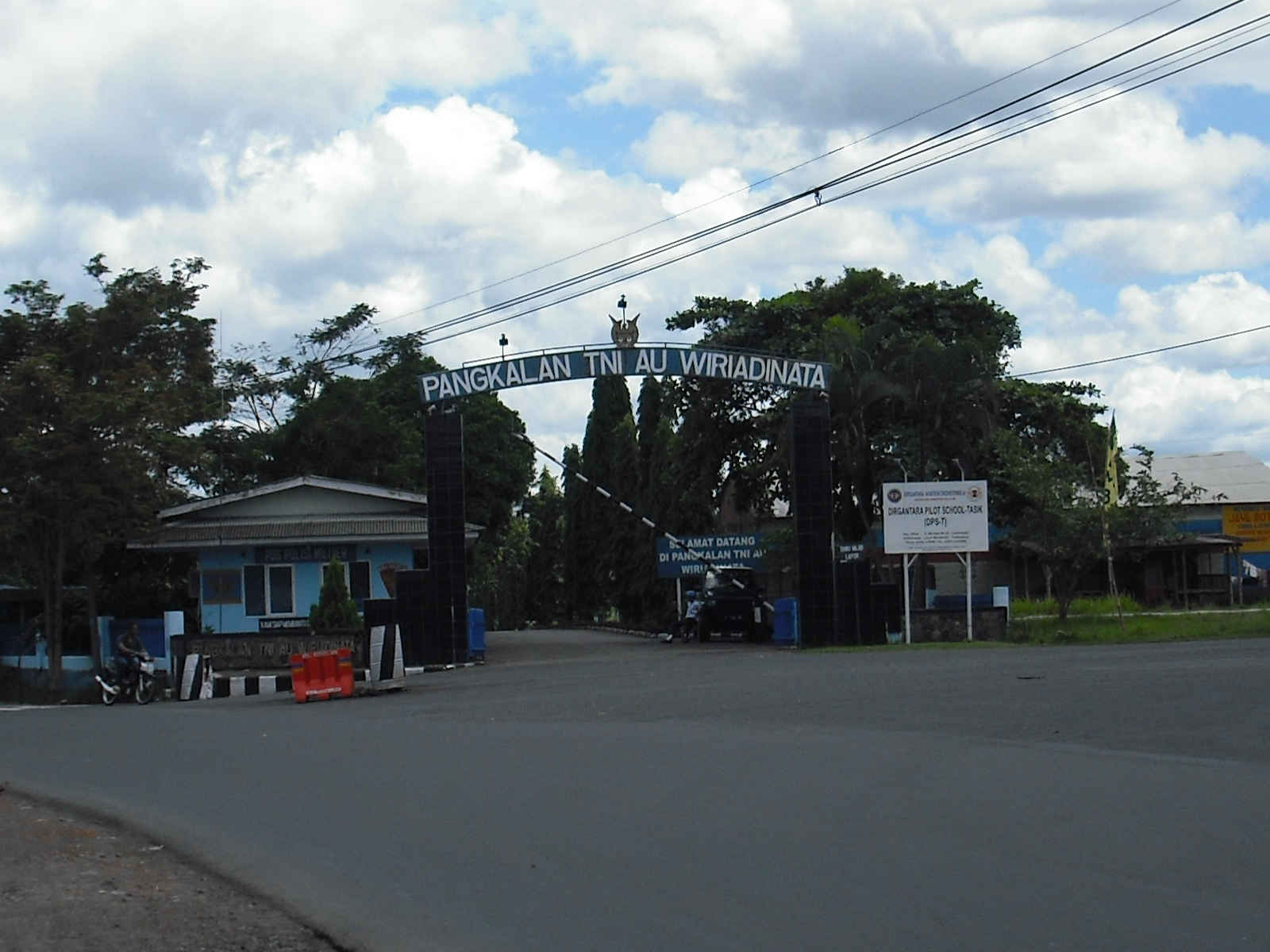
- IATA: TSY; ICAO: WICM

Summary
- Airport type: Public / military
- Operator: Indonesian Air Force; Ministry of Transportation
- Serves: Tasikmalaya
- Location: Cibeureum, Tasikmalaya, West Java, Indonesia
- Time zone: WIB (UTC+07:00)
- Elevation AMSL: 1,158 ft / 352 m
- Coordinates: 07°20′47.77″S 108°14′45.93″E

Map
- Location of airport in Java

Runways
Direction	Length		Surface
Direction	m	ft	Surface
15/33	1,600	5,249	Asphalt

Wiriadinata Airport or Wiriadinata Airbase (IATA: TSY, ICAO: WIAM) is a small airbase operated by Indonesian Air Force. Located at Cibeureum district, Tasikmalaya, West Java, Indonesia, the airport has one runway, with dimensions of 1,600 metres (5,249 ft) by 30 metres (98 ft) which allows the operation of aircraft up to ATR 72-600.

In 2025, it was announced that the Government of Tasikmalaya City will reactivate the airport.

== Facilities ==
- Telecommunication facilities (SSB, VHF)
- Navigation facilities (NDB)
- Facilities landing aids (PAPI, R / W Light)
- Supporting aviation facilities and airport operations (generators, PLN)
- Supporting facilities cost (windshock)
- Space Arrival & Departure
- Restroom & musholah

== Destination ==
As of May 2025, there are no regular scheduled passenger airlines serving the airport.
