= 32nd Air Wing =

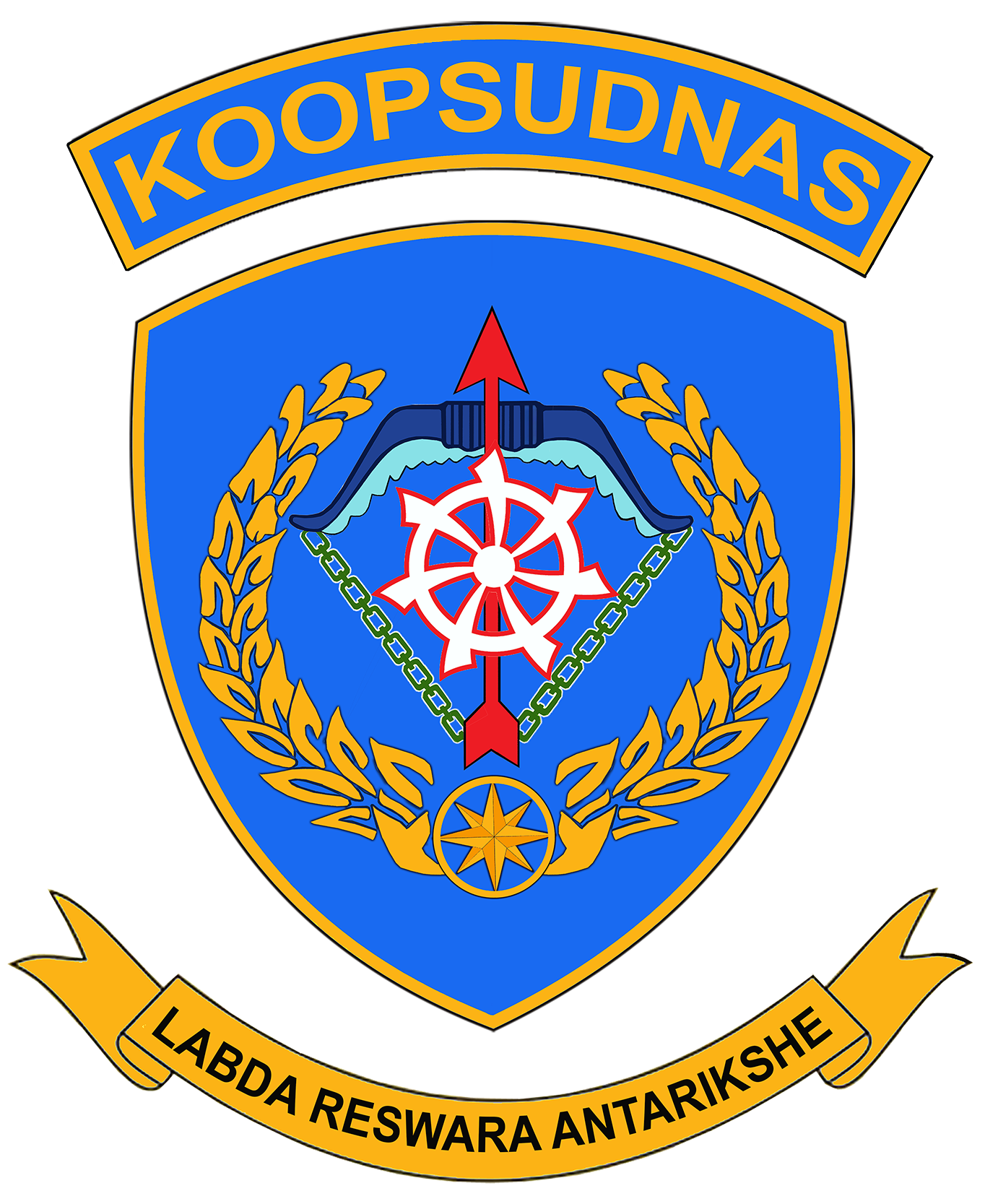
32nd Air Wing
- Wing Udara 32
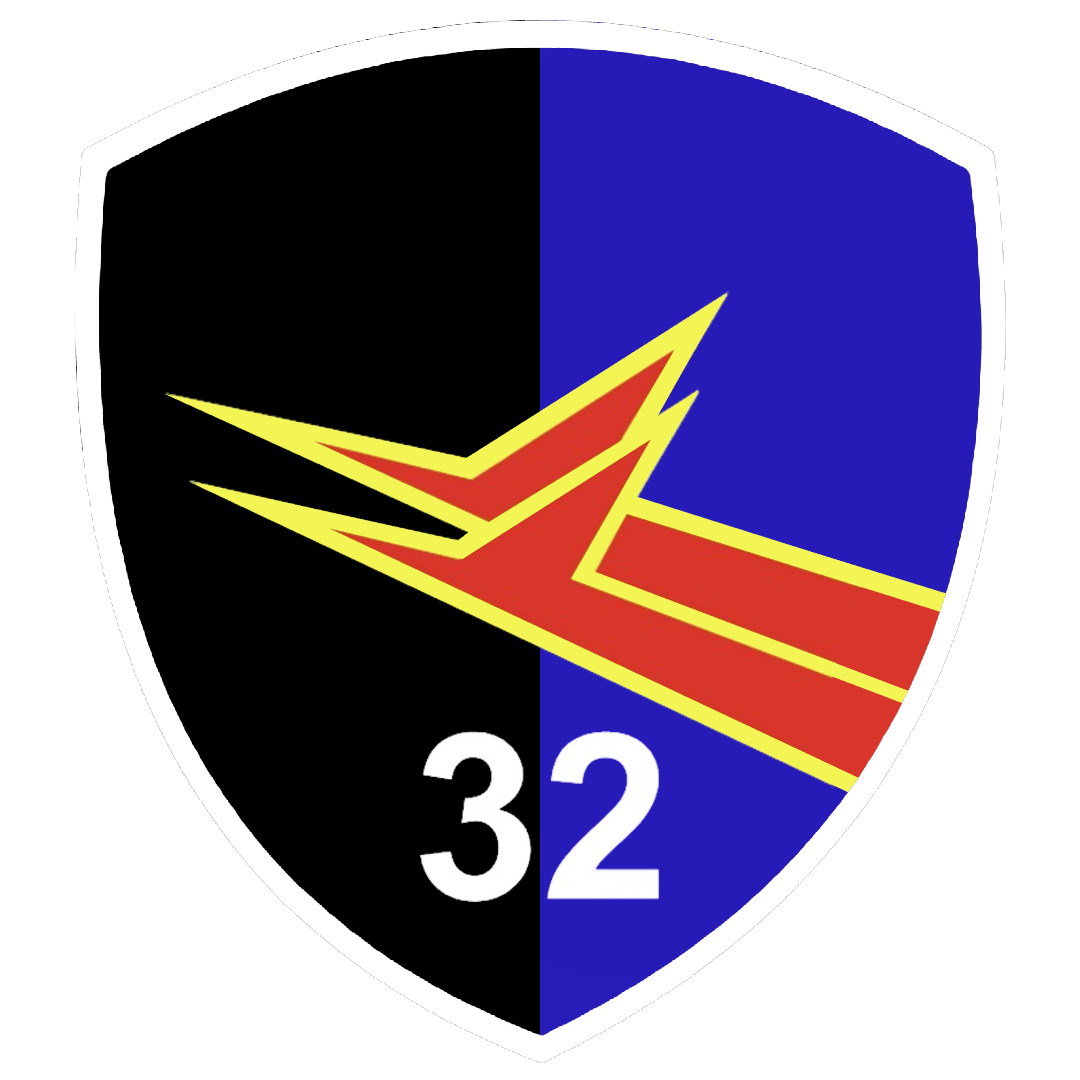
- 32nd Air Wing Badge
- Active: 5 May 2000 (as 3rd Air Wing); August 2025 (current form)
- Country: Indonesia
- Branch: Indonesian Air Force
- Type: Combat (Tempur)
- Role: Fighter
- Size: 4 Air Squadrons
- Part of: Air Force Operation Command; 3rd Group (Combat Group)
- Garrison/HQ: Iswahjudi Air Force Base
- Mottos: Labda Gagana Nirwesti (Sanskrit, transl. Victory in the Air Without Hindrance)
- Website: lanud-iswahjudi.mil.id

Aircraft flown
- Attack: EMB 314 Super Tucano Fighter Attack (Tempur Tembak)
- Fighter: F-16 Fighting Falcon Fighter Intercept (Tempur Sergap)
- Trainer: T-50i Golden Eagle Fighter Attack (Tempur Tembak)

The 32nd Air Wing (Indonesian: Wing Udara 32, sometimes referred to as Wing Udara 3.2) is a unit of the Indonesian Air Force (Indonesian: Tentara Nasional Indonesia Angkatan Udara, (TNI-AU)) tasked with providing technical assistance in the framework of the operational readiness of air squadron crews within its ranks. 32nd Air Wing is under the control of 3rd Group, Air Force Operation Command, based in Iswahjudi Air Force Base, Maospati, Magetan Regency, East Java.

== Units ==
- 3rd Air Squadron "Dragon", equipped with F-16AM/BM (previously F-16A/B Block 15 OCU)
- 14th Air Squadron "Eagle", equipped with F-16C/D Block 52ID (previously F-5E/F and Sukhoi Su-27/30 as a stopgap)
- 15th Air Squadron "Hawk", equipped with KAI T-50i Golden Eagle (previously Hawk 53)
- 21st Air Squadron "Tucano", equipped with EMB 314 Super Tucano (previously OV-10F)
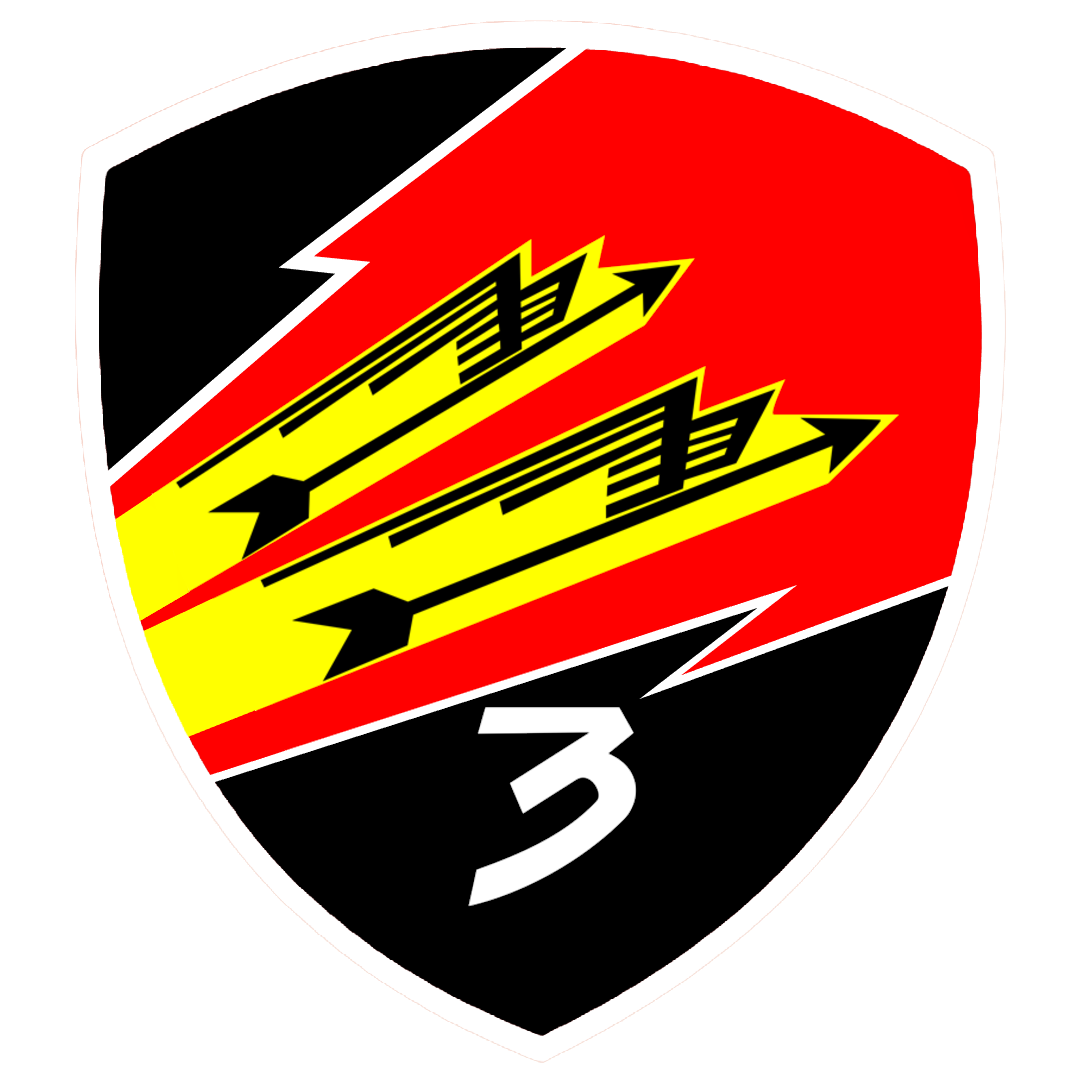
3rd Air Squadron

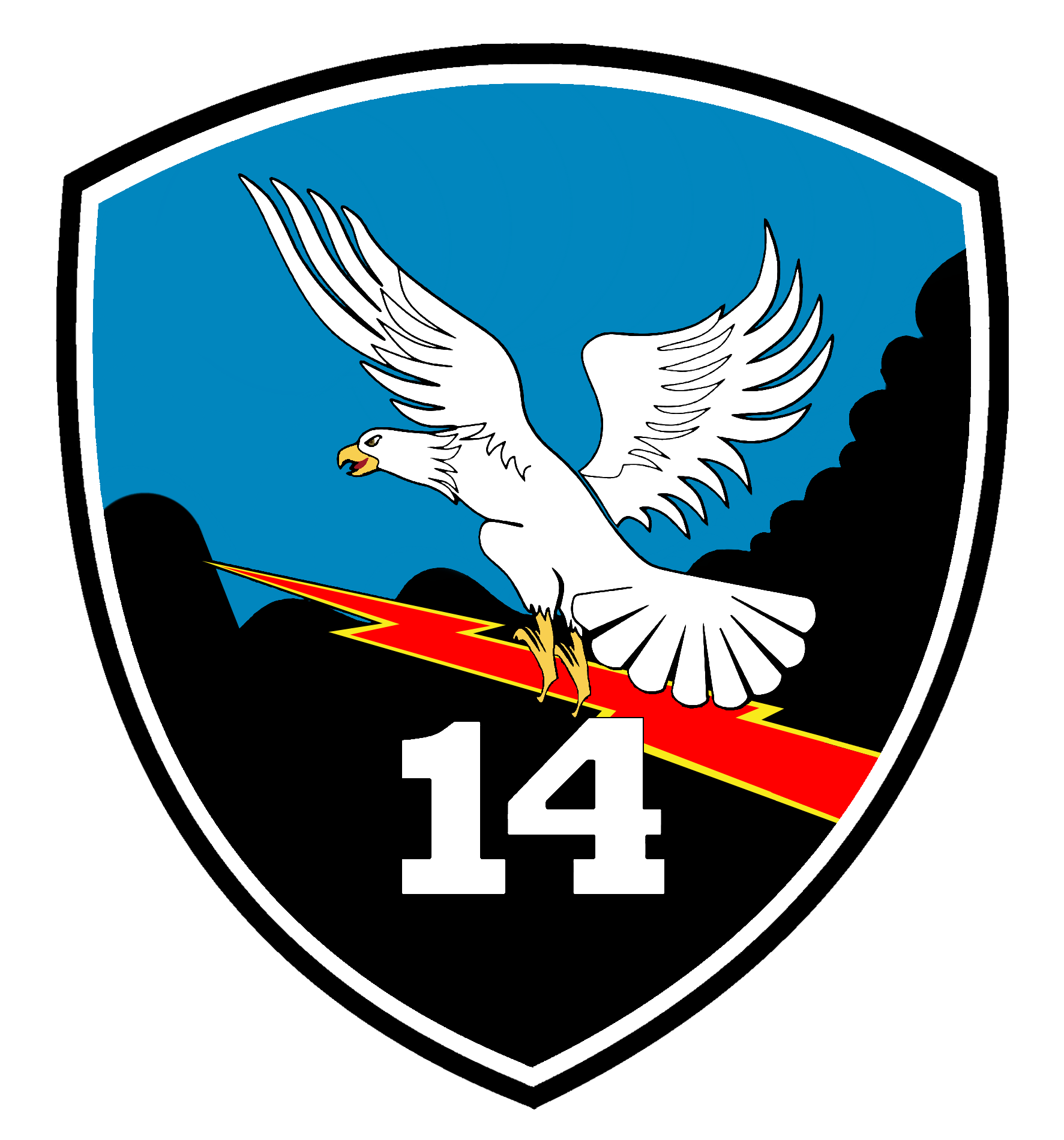
14th Air Squadron

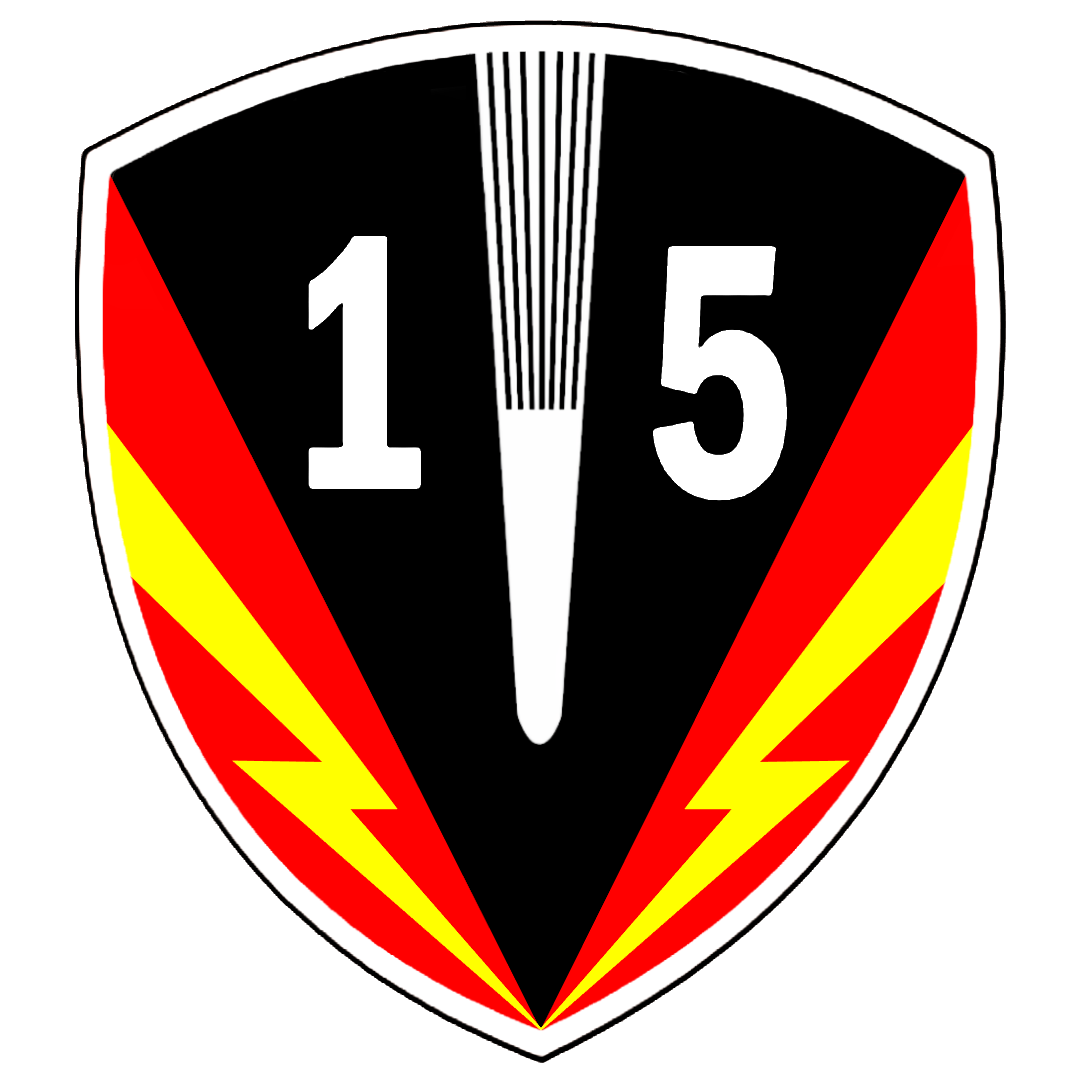
15th Air Squadron

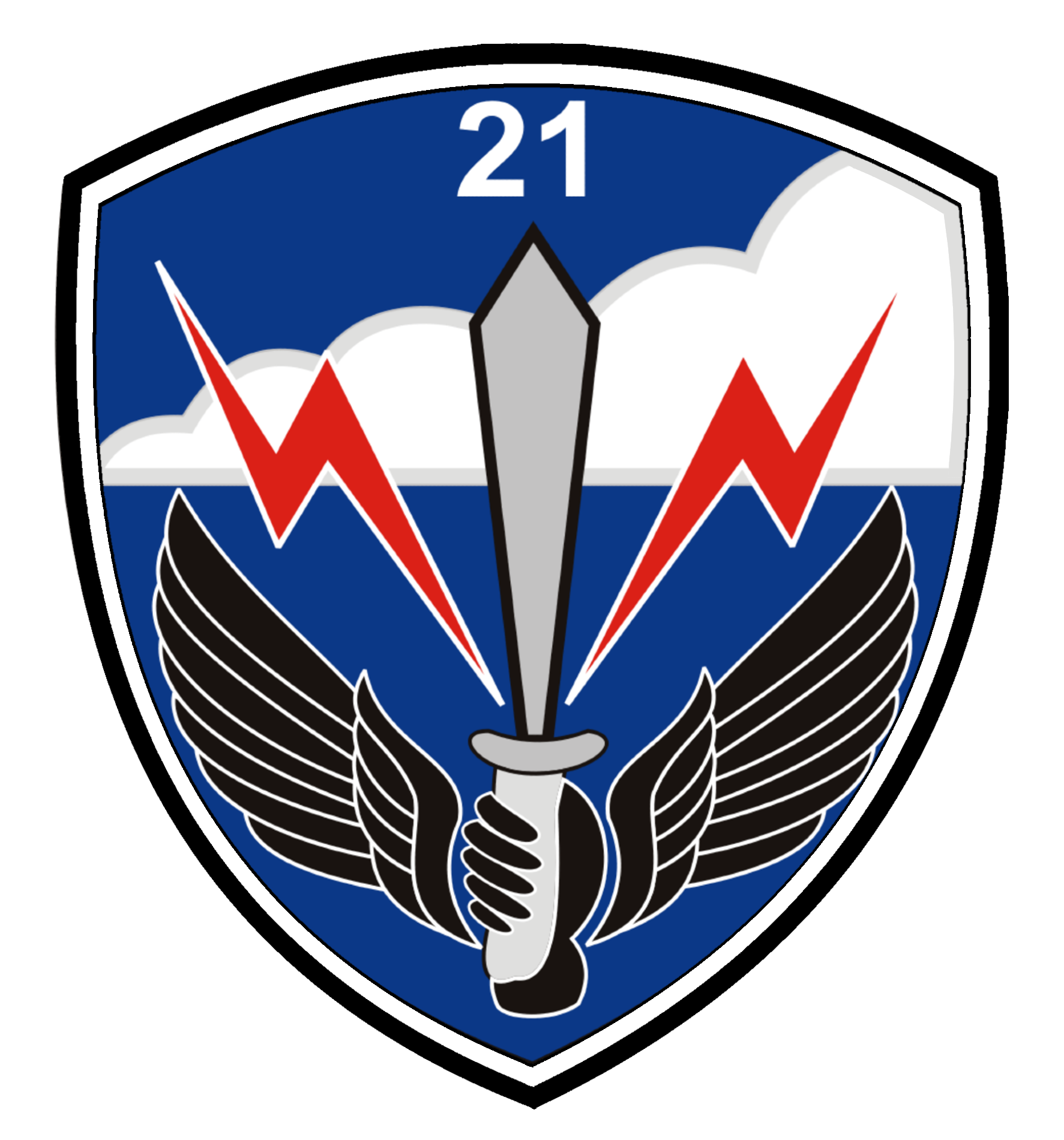
21st Air Squadron

== History ==
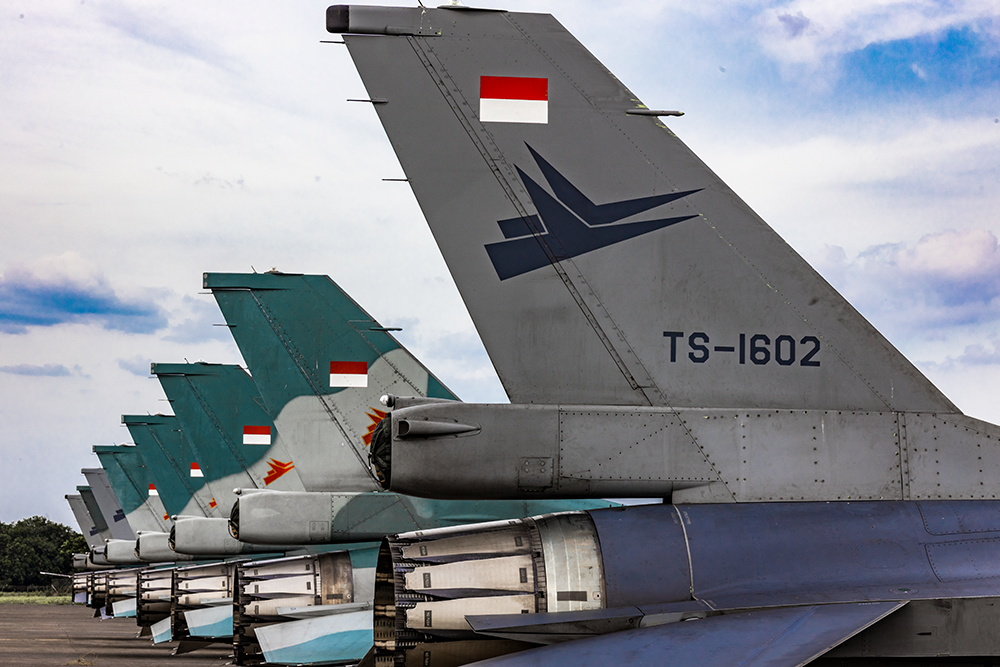
Indonesian Air Force F-16s under the 3rd Air Wing with the Air Wing markings on the fins

Inauguration Ceremony of Operation Wing 003 Iswahyudi Air Base and was inaugurated by Air Admiral Soerjadi Soerjadarma On 17 November 1961 and the Wing Commander held the position of Air Lieutenant Colonel Urip Saroso.

By 1962 under the command of the 300th Wing of the Air Defense Command (Kohanud) and 003rd Wing Ops were equipped with 14 Tu-16A of the 41st Squadron, 12 Tu-16B KS of the 42nd Squadron, as well as 24 MiG-21F of the 14th Squadron. As of September 1962, the 11th, 12th and 14th Air Squadrons were under the command of the 300th Wing of the Air Defense Command (Kohanud) and by 1964 it was known as the 300th Air Defense Wing.

Air Defense Command (Kohanud) itself was disbanded according to Chief of Staff's Decree: Kep/42/VIII/1973 dated 21 August 1973 with its elements, functions, authorities, and responsibilities handed over to the National Air Defense Command (Kohanudnas).

On 20 April 1974, Wing Ops 003 along with the 41st and 42nd Squadrons were 'liquidated' and in October 1979 following the merger of T-33 and F-86 Intercept Units (Satsergap) the 300th Combat Wing was formed under the National Air Defense Command. In the year after that in 1980 it was later changed again as the 300th Operational Wing (Wing Ops).

21 April 1980 saw the delivery of first 8 F-5E/F Tiger II from the United States, delivered by C-5 Galaxy of the Military Airlift Command. The aircraft was later assembled and joined the 14th Air Squadron under the Kohanudnas 300th Wing. In 1985, due to reorganizations within the Indonesian Air Force, the 300th Wing Ops was 'liquidated' again and the squadrons under its command was returned to their respective Air Force Bases.

In accordance with the Decree of the Air Force Chief of Staff Kep/03/I/1985 dated 17 January 1985 the 15th Air Squadron was formed under the 300th Combat Wing, equipped with Hawk 53s for advanced trainers and tactical fighters role. This name was not to last however as the 15th Air Squadron was renamed as 103rd Education Squadron in July 1995 until 6 September 1999 as another decree KEP/19/IX/1999 on the reactivation of the 15th Air Squadron, the 103rd Education Squadron was renamed and remained as 15th Air Squadron.

In accordance with the Decree of the Air Force Chief of Staff number Skep/6/III/1999 dated 16 March 1999 it was officially established. In the context of carrying out its duties, Wing 3 is led by the Wing Commander assisted by the Operations and Training Section (Opslat) whose task is to compile operations and training programs, coordinate and control air support operations, prepare, coordinate and control territorial and SAR operations, supervise and conduct evaluations in the implementation assignments and exercises, as well as submit suggestions and considerations to the Head of the Operations Service (Kadisops), especially those related to their field of work.

In August 2025, the Indonesian Military underwent a significant restructuring, among those are the creation of Groups under the reactivated Air Force Operation Command. The 3rd Air Wing, previously under the Iswahjudi AFB, became the 32nd Air Wing under the 3rd Group of the Air Force Operation Command.

== See also ==
- 6th Air Wing
- National Air Operations Command
- 3rd Air Squadron
