= 32nd Wing =

32nd Wing may refer to:

- 32nd Wing (Italy)
- 32nd Air Wing, Indonesia
- 32d Fighter Wing, United States
