= Iswahjudi Air Force Base =

Indonesian Air Force base in East Java

- Pangkalan Angkatan Udara Iswahjudi
- Maospati, Magetan Regency, East Java in Indonesia
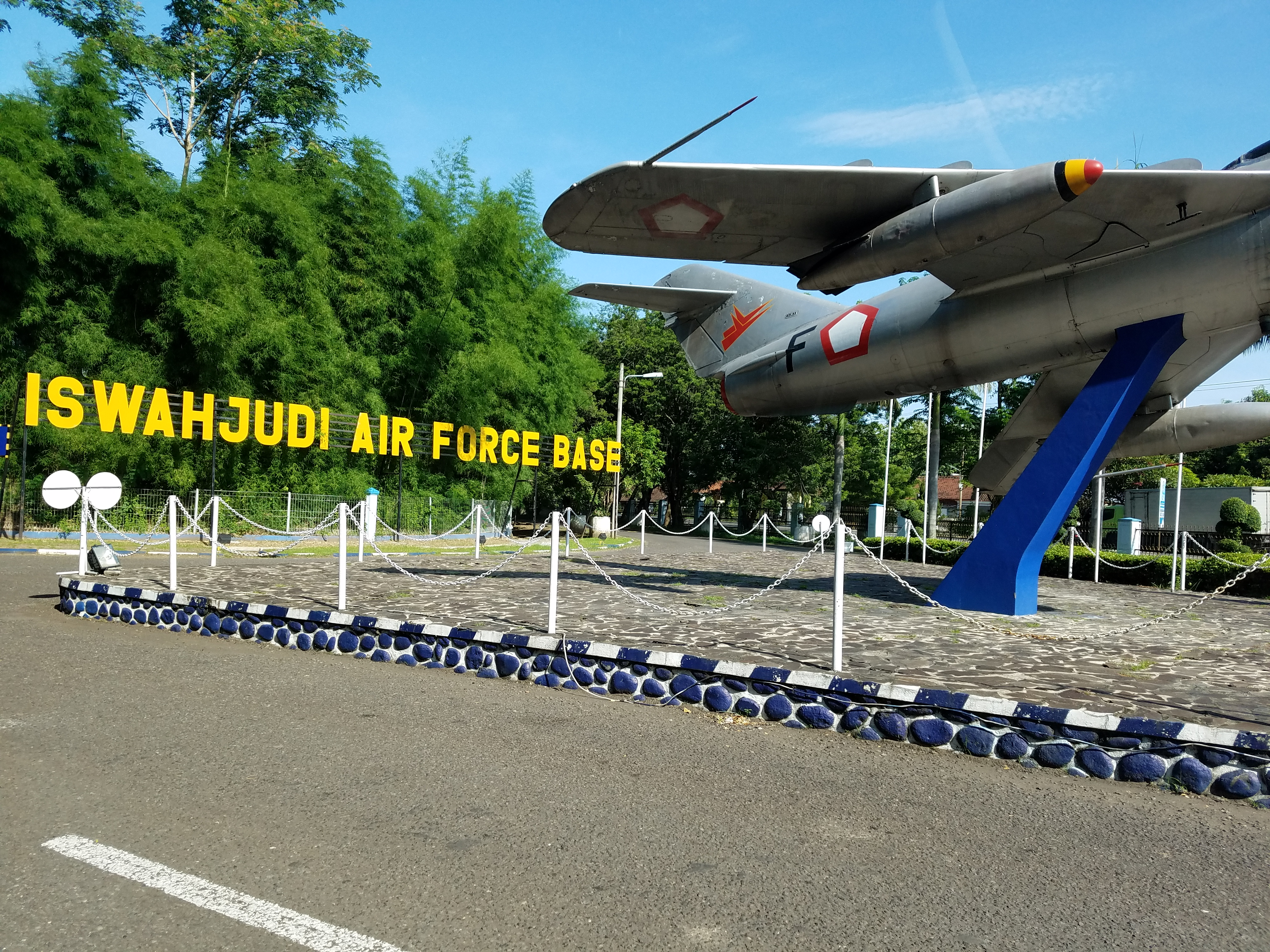
- Iswahjudi Air Force Base gate

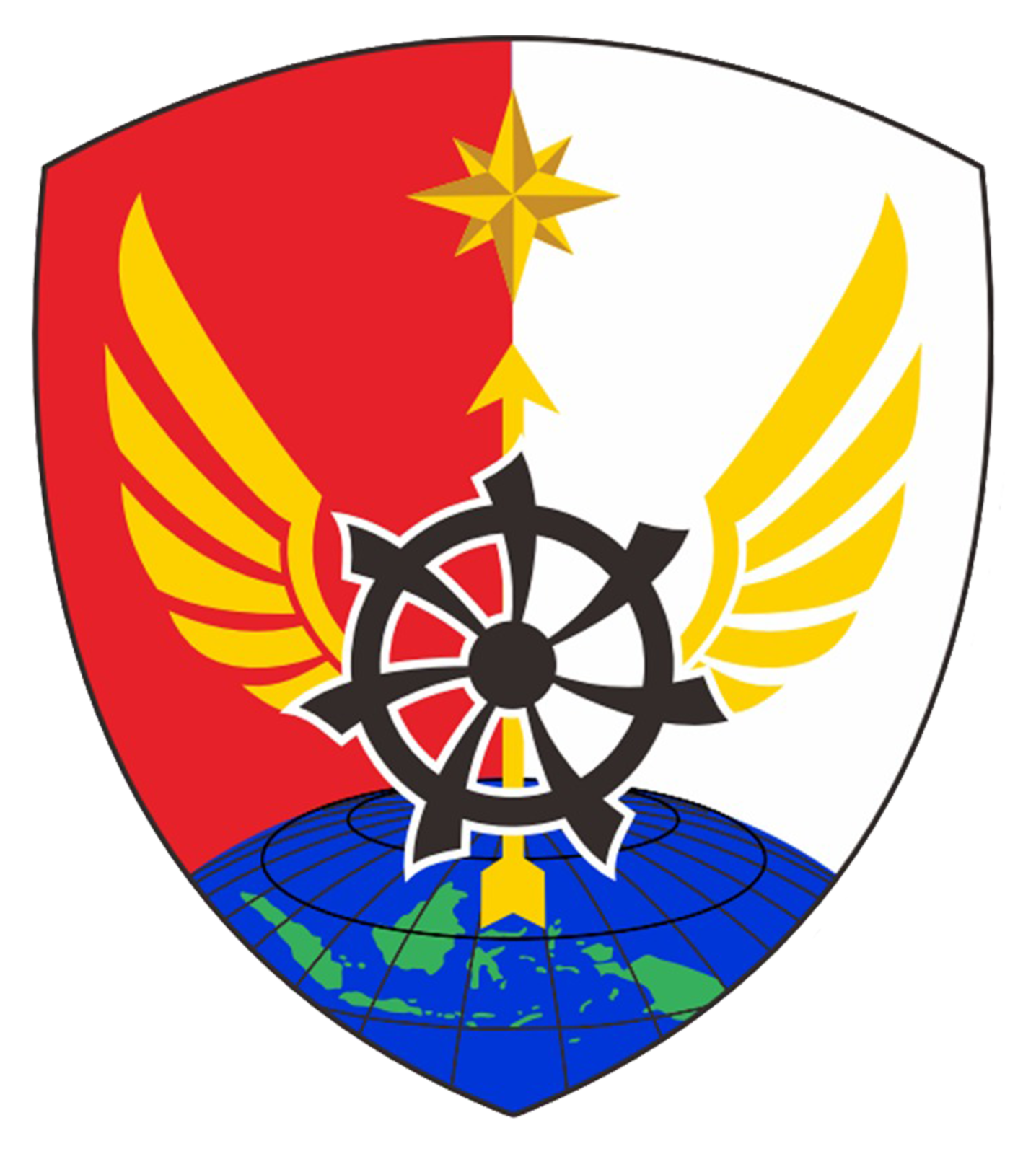

Site information
- Type: Type A Air Force Base
- Owner: Indonesian Air Force
- Controlled by: National Air Operations Command
- Condition: Operational

Location
- Location within Java Location within Indonesia
- Coordinates: 07°36′56.76″S 111°26′02.82″E

Site history
- Built: 1939 (as Maospati Vliegveld)
- Built by: Royal Netherlands East Indies Army Air Force
- In use: 1939–present
- Battles/wars: Dutch East Indies campaign; Battle of Java (1942); Indonesian National Revolution

Garrison information
- Current commander: Colonel Muchtadi Anjar Legowo

Airfield information
- Identifiers: ICAO: WARI, LID: MDN
- Elevation: 110 metres (361 ft) AMSL
Runways
Direction	Length and surface
17R/35L	3,050 metres (10,007 ft) Asphalt
17L/35R	2,575 metres (8,448 ft) Asphalt

Iswahjudi Air Force Base, Iswahjudi Airport, Iswahjudi Airbase or Iswahyudi is an airbase operated by the Indonesian Air Force. It is the main base of several fighter squadrons.

The airbase is located at Maospati, Magetan, near the city of Madiun on the west side of East Javan's capital Surabaya. It is named after Iswahjudi, an Indonesian Air Force officer who, together with Halim Perdanakusuma, was killed in an air crash while returning to Indonesia from Thailand in 1947.

== Geographic ==
This airbase is located at coordinates 111° 26'02.82" east longitude and 07° 36' 56.76" south latitude, Maospati District, Magetan Regency, East Java. Maospati is located at a fork in the highway that connects Madiun City, Magetan Regency, and Ngawi Regency. In the west there is Mount Lawu with a height of 10,712 feet; in the east, there is Mount Wilis with a peak of 8,400 feet; in the south, it stretches the land of the mountains to the South Sea; and in the north is a wide lowland.

== History ==
=== Dutch East Indies ===
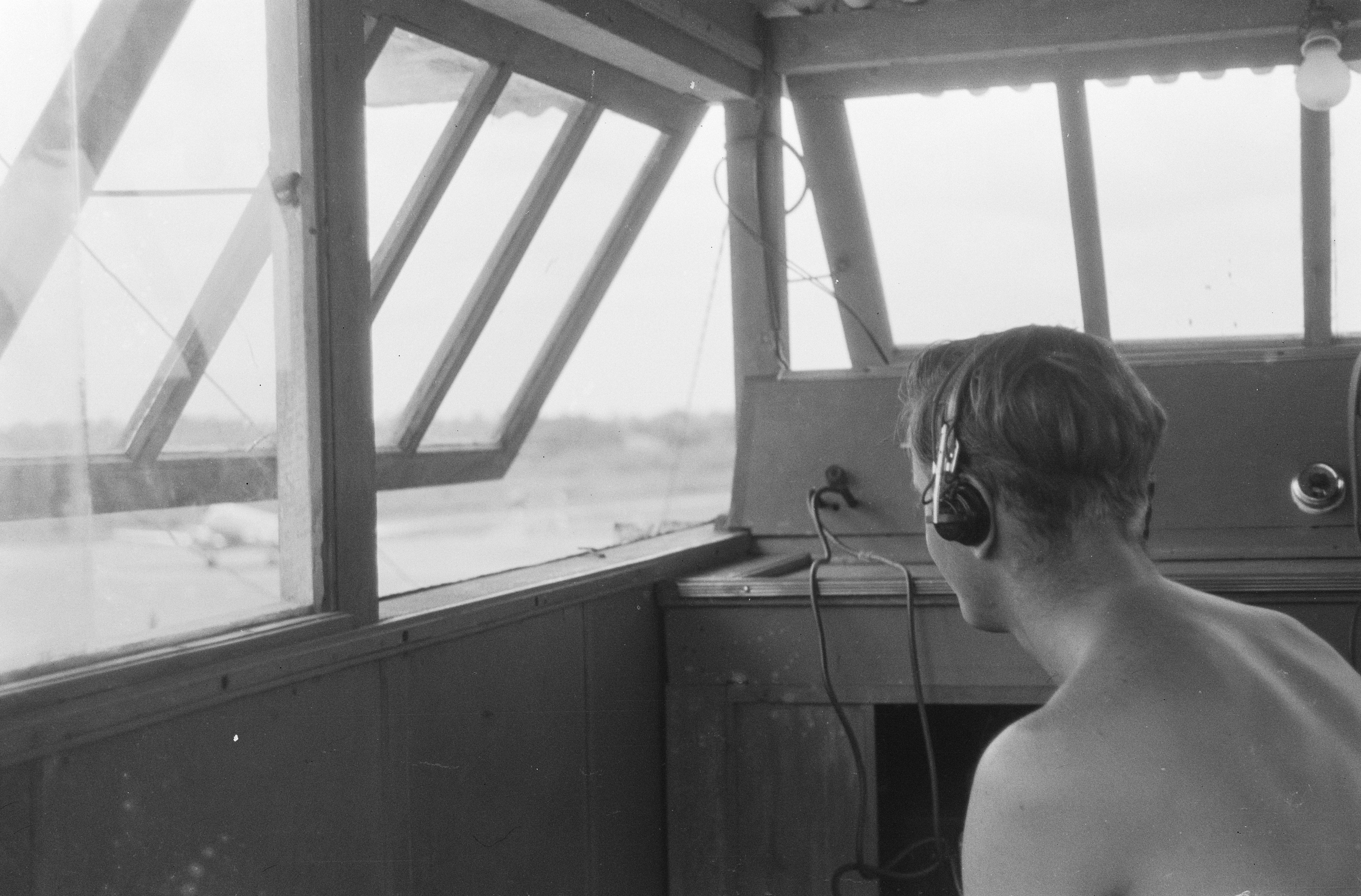
Dutch East Indies ATC officer was at the Maospati Air Base tower (Iswahjudi AFB - now), around 19 April 1949.

In 1890, in Batavia and Aceh, flights using "ballonvaarten" balloons were successfully carried out. This is the first experiment conducted by Koninklijk Nederlandsch-Indische Leger (KNIL) in aerospace. and then the Dutch East Indies government began to develop it. In February 1913, a test flight was conducted in Surabaya with an airplane transported from the Netherlands by ship. And when World War I broke out, it became increasingly necessary to build up the strength of the Air Force.

On May 30, 1914, the Royal Netherlands Air Force embryo was established under the name Proefvliegafdeling (PVA) or the Flight Test Department. Then on March 31, 1939, the Royal Netherlands East Indies Army Air Force or better known as Militaire Luchtvaart (ML) was established in Kalijati, Subang, West Java. And also established Marine Luchtvaart Dienst (MLD) in Surabaya. Both of them only prioritized training Dutch soldiers.

Around 1939, the Dutch began to build the Maospati Air Base (PAU Maospati), with a size of 1,586 X 53 meters, and is located at an altitude of 120 meters above sea level. This base was built as part of the preparation of the Dutch Van Ooorlog department (Ministry of War - Netherlands) to deal with Japanese air attacks, so that it could immediately accommodate Militaire Luchtvaart aircraft.

The construction of this air base required a large area of land, so there was a forced displacement of the population from the following villages:

1. Ngujung Village, Maospati, Magetan, completely relocated
2. Setren Village, some of the rice fields have been moved
3. Kleco Village, some of the rice fields have been moved
4. Lemahbang Village, completely relocated
5. Kinandang Village, completely relocated
6. Kincang Kulon Village, completely relocated
7. Pandeyan village, residents of the village in the southern part were moved, and moved to the area that is now the village of Bogorejo, West, Magetan
8. Mranggen Village, the villagers in the southern part were moved

Residents who have received compensation money have moved voluntarily, and there are several villages that have moved entirely (bedol desa). Like the residents of Pandeyan village, they moved to the north of the main road and occupied the village of Bogorejo and village of Ronowijayan to become the village of Sukolilo. After the residents moved, the construction of the air base began in 1939. The runway was the first thing built. Then proceed with the construction of three hangars in the Klecorejo, Setren and Ngujung areas. Then, they built a workshop building (now the 042 Engineering Squadron hangar), a montage building near the workshop, four warehouses, a workshop and others. The development was continued by building offices, military dormitories (campement) for Dutch soldiers and their families.

=== World War II ===
The Dutch East Indies entered World War II on 10 May 1940, after the Netherlands was invaded by German forces.

Construction of Maospati airfield was completed at the end of May 1940. The base was officially opened with the deployment of 36 aircraft, divided into three squadrons:

- One fighter squadron, 13 Curtiss 75A-7 Hawks, since 1 February 1941
- Two squadrons of fighter, 17 Curtiss Wright 21B Interceptor aircraft, since late 1941
- One training squadron, with a capacity of 6 Brewster F2A Buffalo aircraft

When the Pacific War broke out, in 1941, Maospati became an important base for the Allies.

Following the Japanese invasion of the Dutch East Indies, pilots from the base were involved in intense air combat and suffered many casualties, including the base commander, Captain H.J. Van De Pool, who was killed in action.

After the Dutch high command surrendered to the Japanese, on 8 March 1942, the Imperial Japanese Navy (Kaigun Kokusho) took control of the air base. Imperial Japanese Army (Rikugun) units were stationed in the area to defend to base.

Unlike other airfields on Java, Maospati was not often used for air operations by Japanese units. It was used mostly to store spare parts for Japanese aircraft.

=== Post-Independence ===
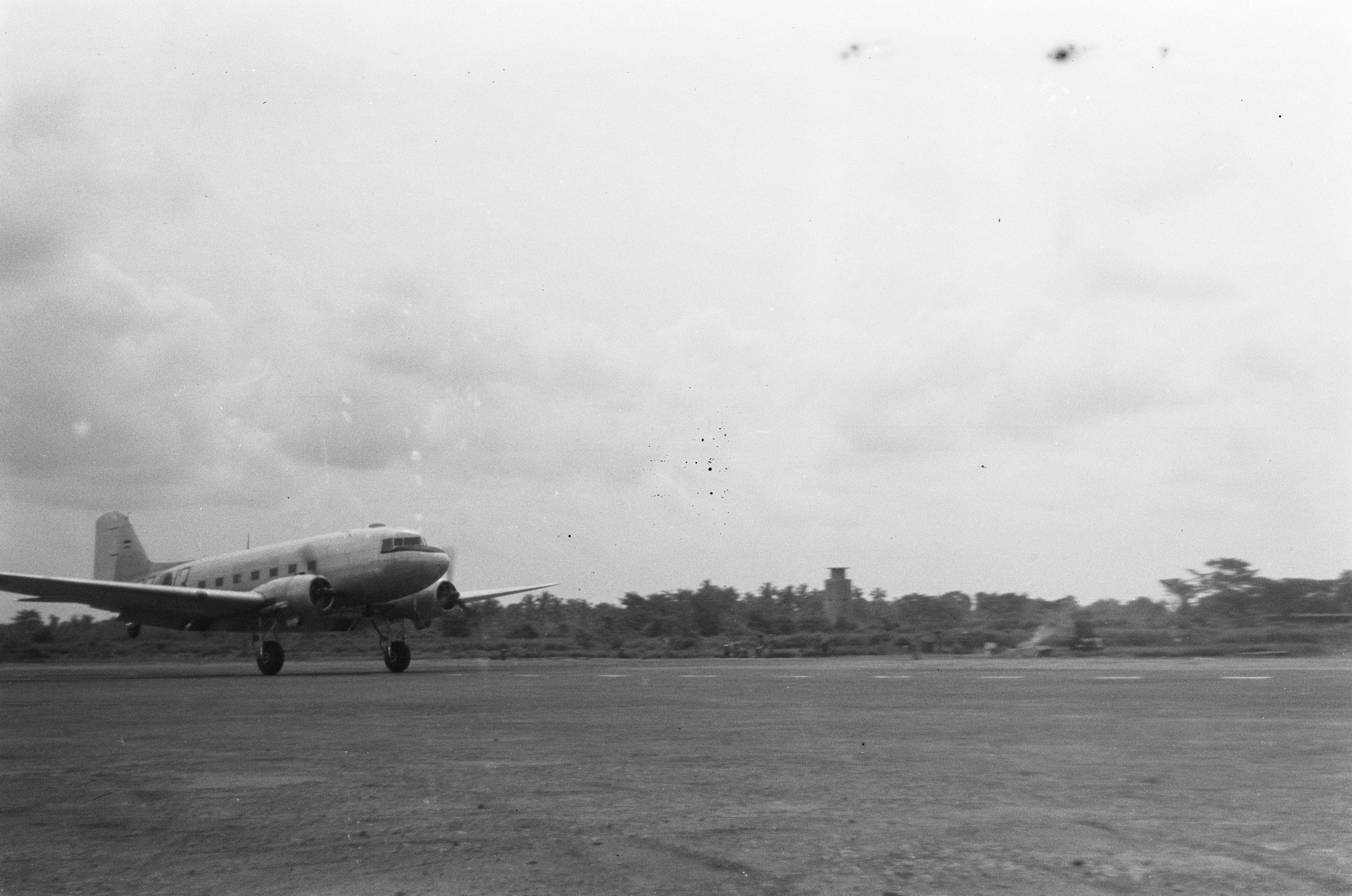
A Dakota-type transport plane landed at Maospati Airbase around 19 April 1949

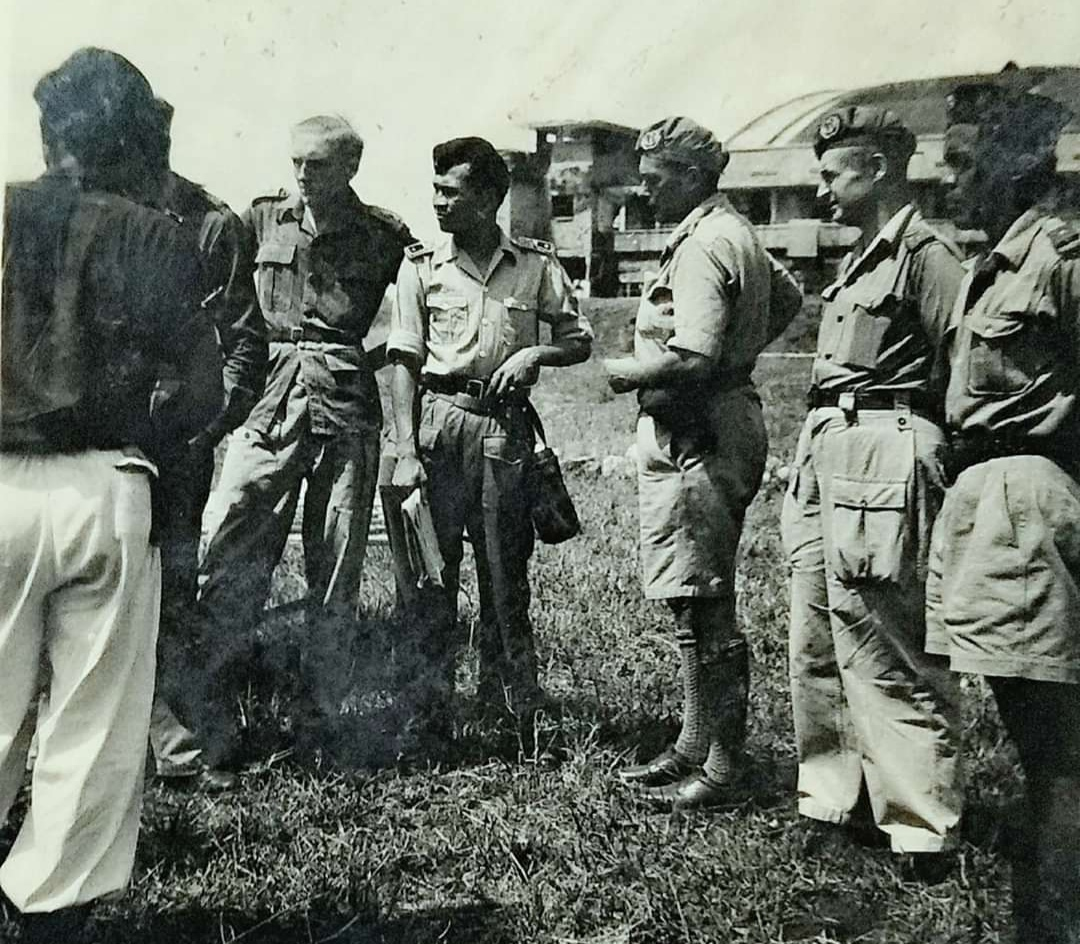
November 9, 1949, Major Sabirin Mochtar, Commander of the Sikatan Battalion, was accepting the handover of Maospati airbase from the Dutch after the completion of the Second Dutch Aggression. Previously they were still attacking each other in battles in Kediri and Madiun.

After Indonesia's independence, the Maospati Air Base was controlled by the soldiers of the struggle at that time. On 27 August 1945, this airbase was handed over by the commander of Dai Nippon in Maospati to Wedono Maospati. The BKO TKR (People's Security Army Aircraft Workshop) Maospati was handed over from the Madiun TKR Regiment Commander to MB AURI (Air Force Headquarters) on May 5, 1946, and since then officially belongs to the Air Force and is referred to as the National Air Base. Prof. Dr. Abdul Rahman Saleh was appointed as the base commander as well as the commander of the Bugis base, Malang. His representative is H. Soejono who also comes from the same base.

During this period, this airbase was badly damaged by attacks by Dutch warplanes and almost all other airbases in Java except for the Maguwo Air Base and the MB AURI in Yogyakarta because it was protected by bad weather.

Based on the Decree of the Minister/Commander of the Air Force Number 564 dated November 4, 1960, the "Maospati Air Base" changed its name to "Iswahjudi Air Force Base". With the development of the role of Iswahjudi Air Base in the struggle for Irian Jaya, it became the Main Air Base (Lanuma). Currently, the Indonesian Air Force Base Iswahjudi is a Type A air base and is under the Air Operations Command II.

The Australian RAAF Sabre Advisory Unit was deployed to Iswahjudi between October 1972 and February 1975. It oversaw the transfer of CAC Sabre aircraft to Indonesia and trained Indonesian air and ground crew to operate the type.

== Based units ==
The units within the Iswahjudi Airbase include:

- 3rd Group
  - 32nd Air Wing
    - 3rd Air Squadron
    - 14th Air Squadron
    - 15th Air Squadron
- 042nd Engineering Squadron
- 476th Air Defense Detachment

- 463rd Commando Battalion

- Iswahjudi Air Force Base Military Police Unit

=== Other site ===
- Pulung Air Weapon Range, Ponorogo
- Dr. Efram Harsana Air Force Hospital
- Pacitan Detachment, Pacitan

== Sources ==
- Rahardjo, Drajat (2003). Elang Tanah Air Di Kaki Lawu. Madiun: Iswahyudi Air Force Base.
- Soewito, Dra. Irna H.N. Hadi; Suyono, Dr. Nana Nurliana; Suhartono, Dra. Soedarini (2008). Awal Kedirgantaraan Di Indonesia : Perjuangan AURI 1945 - 1950. Yayasan Pustaka Obor Indonesia. ISBN 978-602-433-016-3.
- Sudarmanto, Y.B. (1996). Jejak-Jejak Pahlawan dari Sultan Agung hingga Syekh Yusuf [The Footsteps of Heroes from Sultan Agung to Syekh Yusuf] (in Indonesian). Jakarta: Grasindo. ISBN 978-979-553-111-1.
