= RAAF Sabre Advisory Unit =

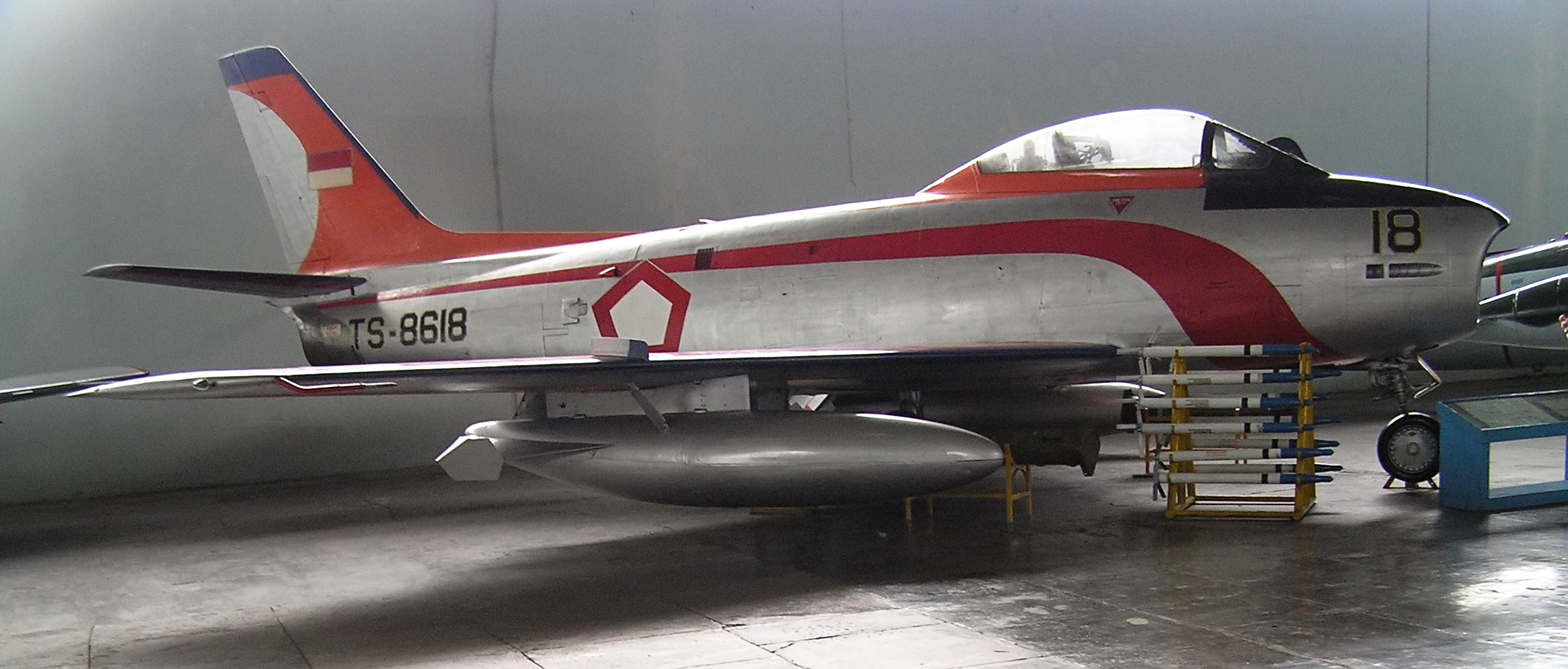
- A retired Indonesian CAC Sabre in the Dirgantara Mandala Museum
- Active: 6 October 1972 - 14 February 1975
- Branch: Royal Australian Air Force
- Role: Administration and training
- Location: Iswahjudi Air Force Base

The RAAF Sabre Advisory Unit comprised Royal Australian Air Force (RAAF) personnel who were posted to Indonesia between October 1972 and February 1975 to transfer and provide instruction on sixteen CAC Sabre aircraft which Australia had donated to the Indonesian Air Force.

== History ==
In January 1972 the Australian government agreed to a request from the Indonesian government to donate some of the RAAF's CAC Sabre fighter aircraft to improve the Indonesian Air Force's air defence capabilities. This formed part of a wider agenda to improve Australia–Indonesia relations, which had previously been tense. At the time the RAAF had 33 Sabres in service, where they were being used for training purposes, as well as others in storage. The Australian government was concerned over the ability of the Indonesian Air Force to operate the aircraft and it was agreed that Indonesian instructors would be trained in Australia. The Sabre donation formed part of a package of military assistance for Indonesia which was formally announced by Australian prime minister William McMahon during a June 1972 state visit by Indonesian president Suharto. Australia had previously donated 16 Sabres to the Royal Malaysian Air Force in 1969, with the RAAF's Sabre Advisory Flight supporting the aircraft between 1969 and 1972.

The RAAF Sabre Advisory Unit was established to oversee the transfer of the Sabres and provide training. It was formed on 6 October 1972 at RAAF Base Williamtown and travelled to Iswahjudi Air Force Base in Indonesia ten days later. Indonesian personnel were trained at Williamtown, with 150 air and ground crew completing training by February 1973.

The 16 Sabres which had been agreed to be donated were flown to Indonesia in February 1973 by RAAF pilots. A 17th aircraft was sent to Indonesia shortly afterwards to replace a Sabre that had been written off in a crash. They were officially transferred to Indonesia on 9 April that year. Australia also donated equipment needed to support the Sabres, including spare parts, radios and a flight simulator.

The 14th Air Squadron located at Iswahjudi Air Force Base operated the donated Australian Sabres. Sabre Advisory Unit personnel trained Indonesian air and ground crew at Iswahjudi. They also provided advice on modifications to the air base needed to support the Sabres, including improved navigation equipment. As of October 1973, the Sabre Advisory Unit comprised 24 RAAF personnel. They lived in a holiday resort at Sarangan and travelled as a group each day to Iswahjudi.

The RAAF Sabre Advisory Unit was disbanded on 14 February 1975 and its personnel returned to Australia. A small number of RAAF personnel remained in Indonesia to provide advice on maintaining the Sabres.

In July 1976 Australia re-acquired five CAC Sabres from Malaysia and donated them to Indonesia to replace aircraft that had been written off. The Indonesian Air Force retired the type in 1982.
