= 14th Air Squadron =

- Skadron Udara 14
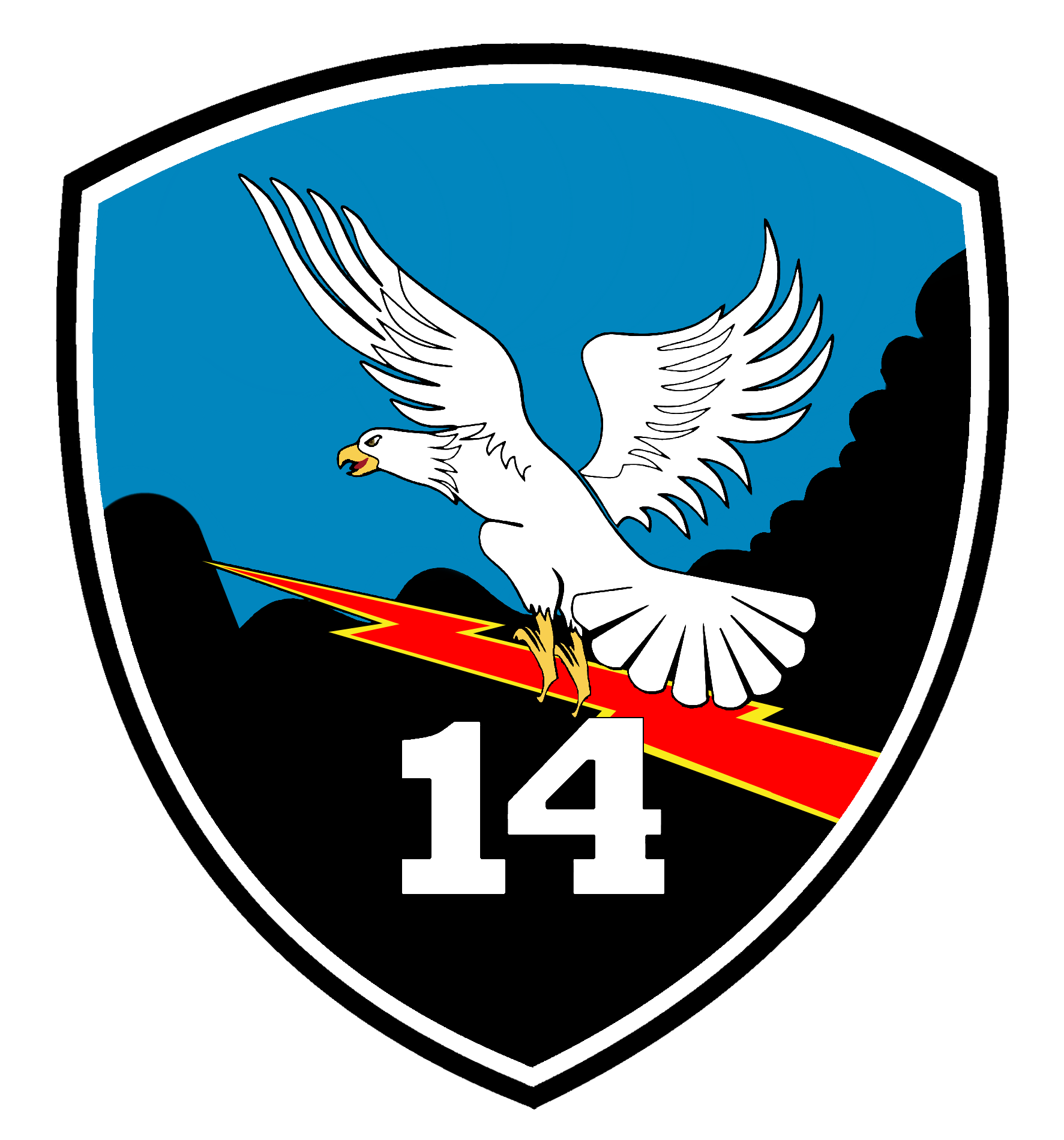
- 14th Air Squadron Badge
- Active: 1 July 1962–present
- Country: Indonesia
- Branch: Indonesian Air Force
- Type: Fighter
- Part of: 32nd Air Wing
- Garrison/HQ: Iswahjudi Air Force Base
- Nicknames: Tigers; Eagles (Flight callsign)
- Mottos: "Akasha Parakrama" (Powerful in the sky)
- Anniversaries: 1 July
- Website: https://www.instagram.com/skadronudara14/

Commanders
- Current commander: Maj. Ferry Rachman

Insignia
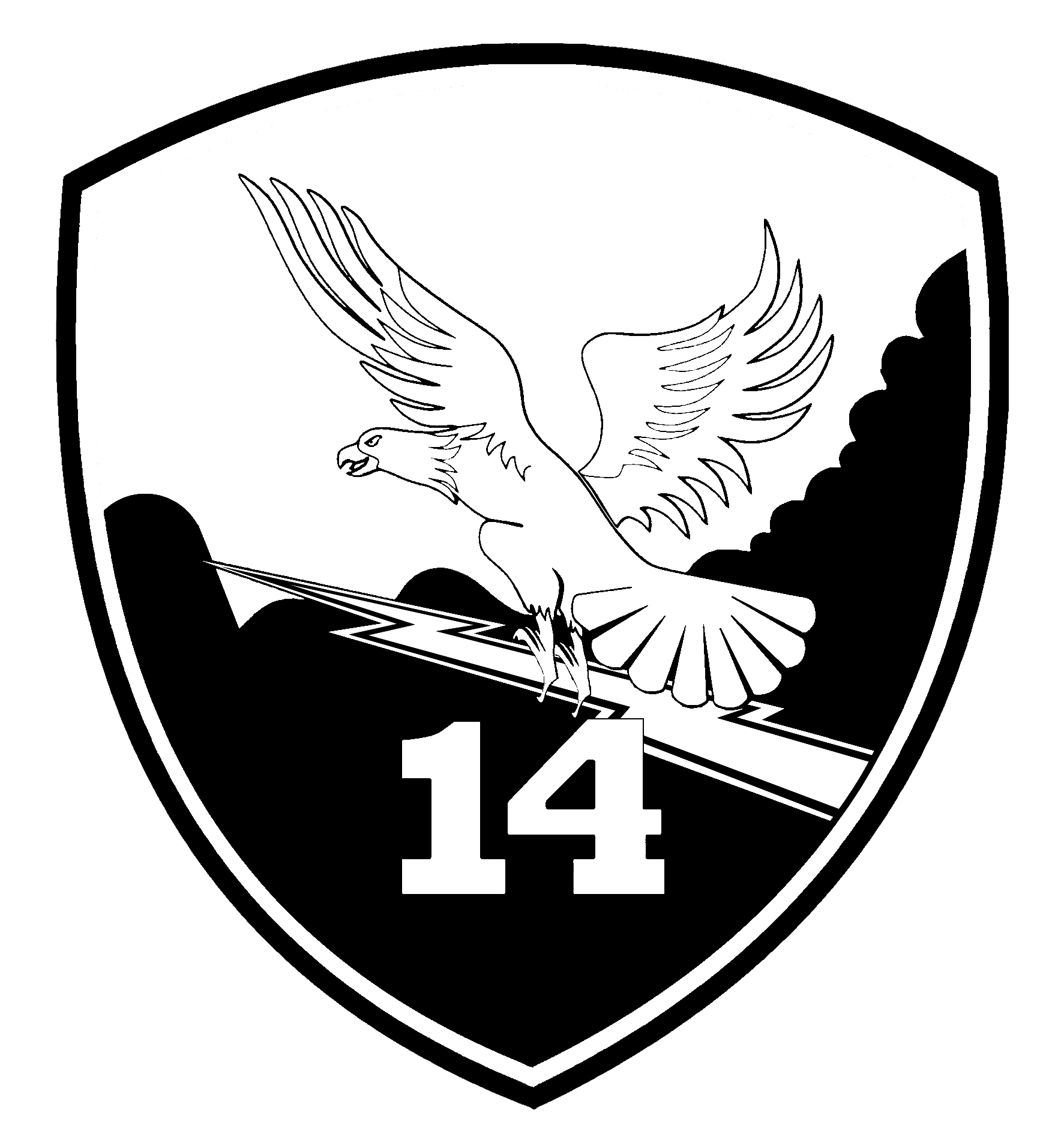
- 14th Air Squadron low visibility Badge

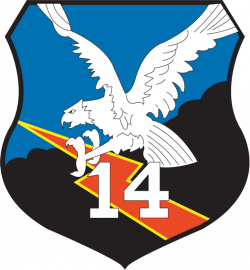
- 14th Air Squadron Patch

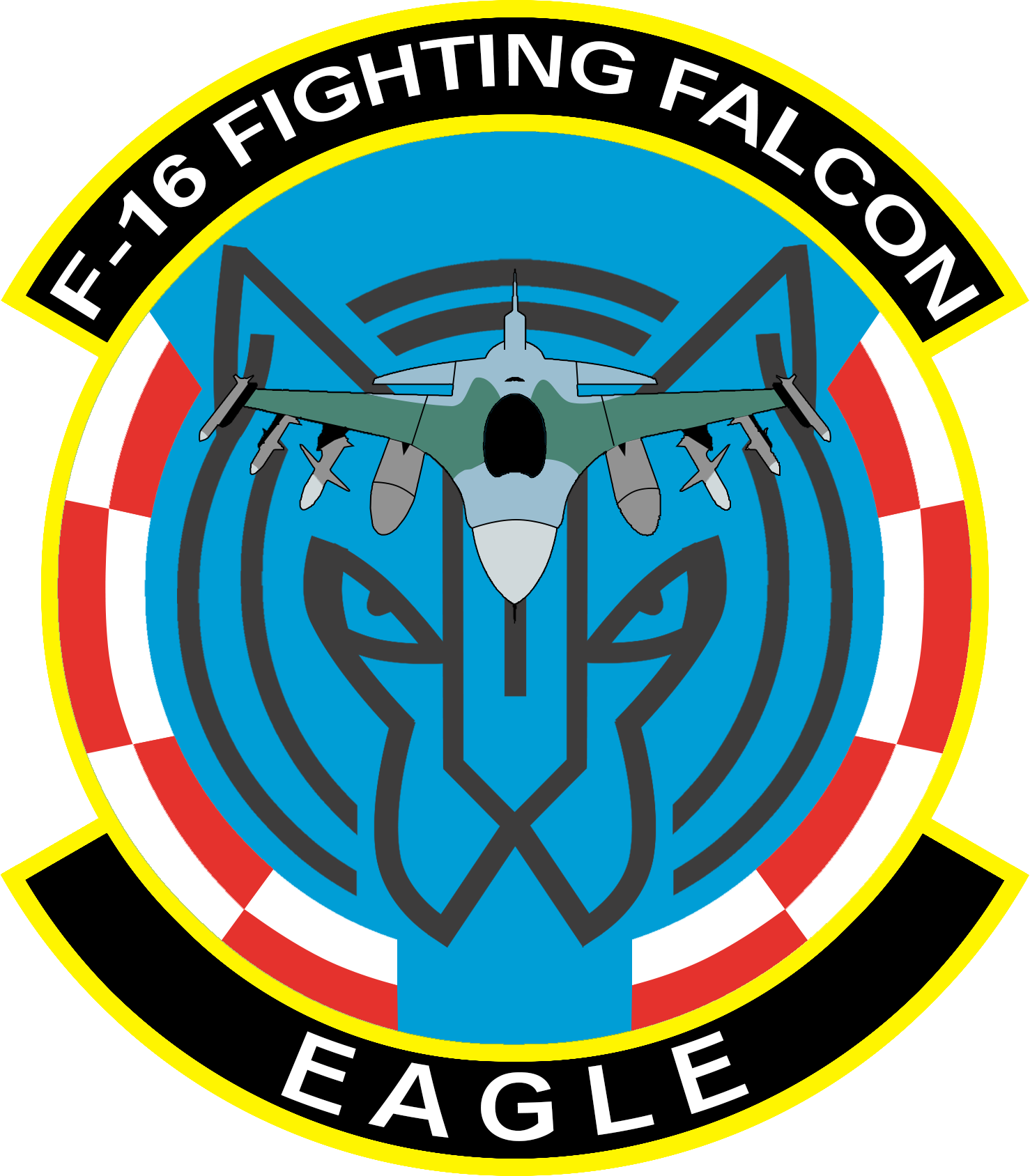
- 14th Air Squadron Patch

Aircraft flown
- Fighter: General Dynamics F-16C/D Fighting Falcon

The 14th Air Squadron (Indonesian: Skadron Udara 14) is a Fighter Squadron of the Indonesian Air Force (TNI-AU) under the command of the 32nd Air Wing, headquartered in Iswahjudi Air Force Base, Maospati, Magetan Regency, East Java.

The 14th Air Squadron has operated several fighter aircraft throughout its history, including the MiG-21F-13 Fishbed (1962 - 1970), F-86 Avon Sabre (1974 - 1980) and F-5E/F Tiger II (1980 - 2017), Sukhoi Su-27/Su-30 Flanker.

On 13 October 2022, the squadron transitioned to the F-16C/D Fighting Falcon, which has since served as its primary fighter aircraft.

== History ==
=== General ===
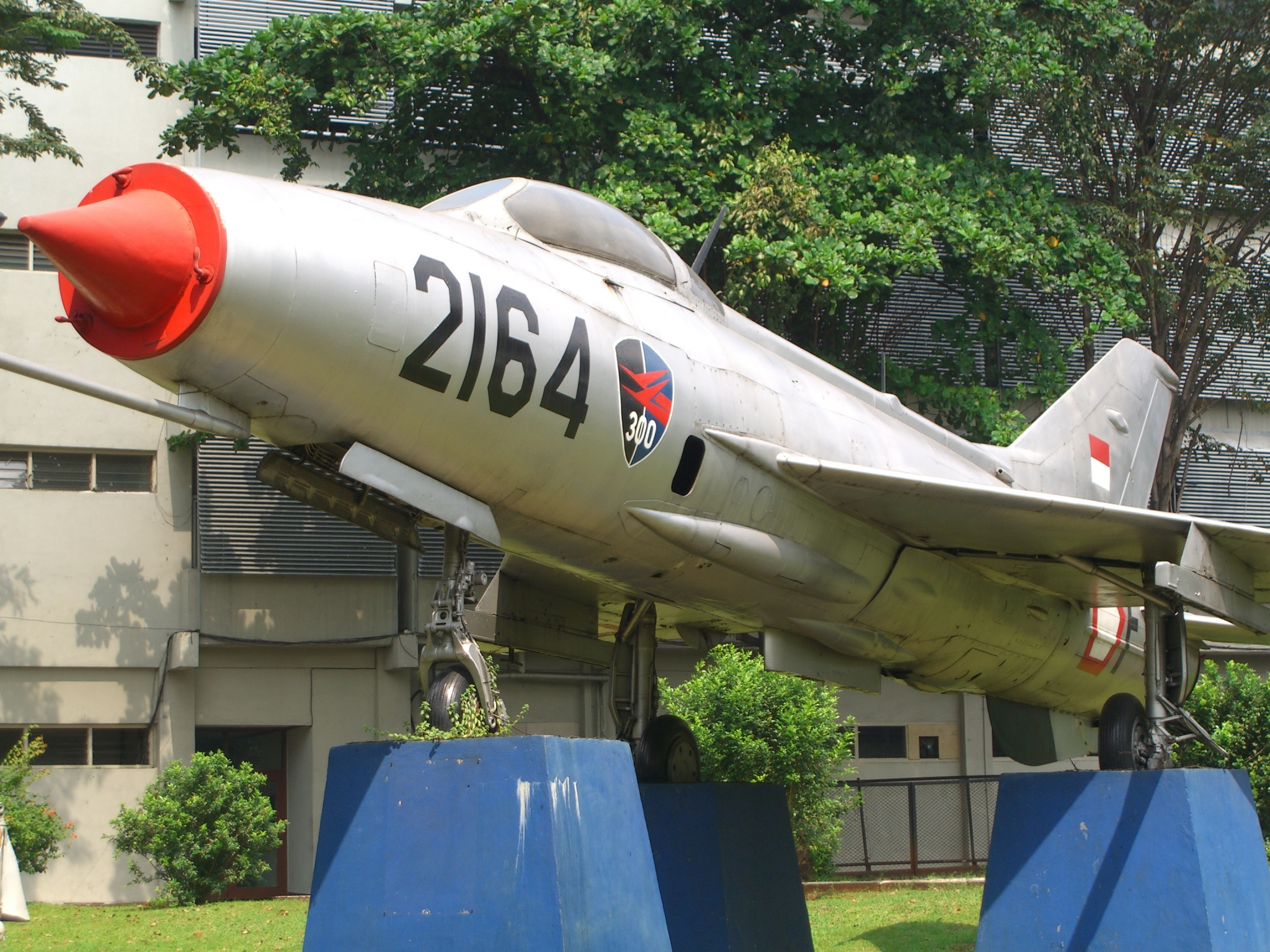
Indonesian MiG-21

The history of this Air Squadron cannot be separated from Iswahjudi Air Force Base which was built during the Dutch East Indies era around 1940 under the name Maospati Air Force Base (PAU Maospati). This airfield was built with dimensions of 1,586 X 53 meters. When the Pacific War broke out, this base was used as a base for Allied forces on the island of Java. When the Allies surrendered to the Japanese army in 1942, this base was controlled by the Japanese Navy (Kaigun Kokusho). After independence, this base was controlled by Indonesian troops. Since 4 November 1960, and based on the Decree of the Minister/Commander of the Air Force Number 564, this air base has changed to the Iswahjudi Air Force Base (Indonesian: Pangkalan TNI Angkatan Udara (Lanud) Iswahjudi).

In 1950 - 1960, Maospati Air Force Base did not experience many changes. This airfield had the same condition when it was abandoned by Japan in 1945. Flight operations were only carried out by other aircraft that stopped there. The condition of the runway was also bad and not maintained. The size of the runway is still the same as when it was first built by the Dutch. Starting in September 1957, the Air Force carried out a program to build a new runway related to preparations for Operation Trikora. Where the AURI will place Tu-16, Tu-16KS and MiG-21 aircraft at this base. The construction was carried out by John Building Company (JBC), a national company based in Jakarta. The work experienced many obstacles so that the construction process was frozen by the AURI. Furthermore, the work was carried out by the Air Force in collaboration with local contractors in Madiun and was completed in 1960.

The construction that was successfully carried out was the extension of the runway to 2,350 X 60 meters, where both ends of the runway were made of concrete with dimensions of 60 X 60 meters. Other developments include a taxiway measuring 3,300 X 23 meters and the construction of a platform measuring 200 X 100 meters. In this development, a 12 km long water channel was also built.

The event related to the formation of this squadron was Operation Trikora. In this operation, Indonesia attempted to reclaim West Irian from the hands of the Dutch colonialists. This was based on the fact that West Irian was a Dutch colony and since Indonesian independence was proclaimed, all Dutch colonies had to be handed over to Indonesia, including West Irian. However, the Dutch ignored this, instead declaring the area part of Dutch territory. This made Indonesian President Sukarno launch Operation Trikora to seize West Irian after various diplomatic efforts through the United Nations and the Non-Aligned Movement failed.

Meanwhile, in mid-1958, Indonesia brought in 30 MiG-15UTI jet aircraft which arrived at Kemayoran Air Force Base (PAU Kemayoran). These planes arrived in Indonesia on 14 August 1958 and entered the 11th Air Squadron. Indonesia also brought in 22 Ilyushin Il-28 bombers which arrived on 4 October 1958 from Russia, and were assigned to the 21st Air Squadron, and 22nd Air Squadron PAU Kemayoran. Apart from that, in early 1949, 49 MiG-17 aircraft arrived from Czechoslovakia and were assigned to Air Squadron 11. When the confrontation peaked in the early 1960s, the government brought in 10 MiG-19 aircraft to be assigned to Air Squadron 12 at PAU Kemayoran. Apart from that, Indonesia also purchased 20 MiG-21 aircraft in 1962 and placed them in Air Squadron 14. This was done to increase the Air Force's air power so that it could deter opponents.

=== Birth of the 14th Air Squadron ===
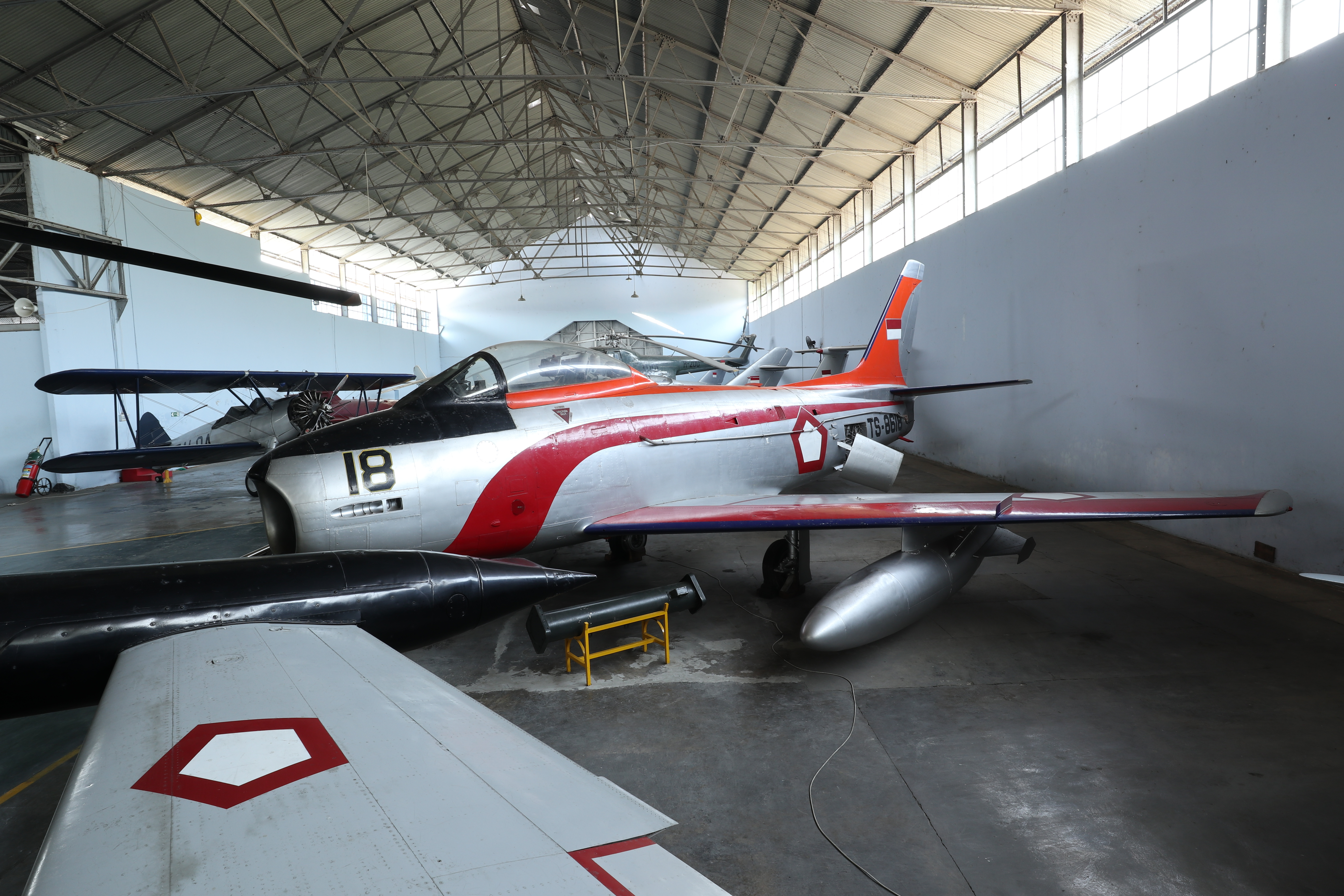
Indonesian CA-27 CAC Sabre

Based on the Decree of the Minister/Chief of Staff of the Air Force, Number: Skep/135/VII/1962 dated 1 July 1962 concerning the formation of the 14th Air Squadron with the main headquarters at PAU Iswahjudi, Maospati, Magetan, East Java. This squadron initially had 20 MiG-21F aircraft made by Eastern Bloc countries, with its first commander, Air Major Roesman. In fact, Roesman had previously served as Commander of the 11th Air Squadron, but he was trusted to lead the 14th Air Squadron. The inauguration of this Squadron was carried out on 8 August 1962 at PAU Kemayoran. With the establishment of this squadron with MiG-21F, Indonesia was the first country outside the Warsaw Pact to operate it. The decree dated 1 July 1962 was finally commemorated as the anniversary of Air Squadron 14. Apart from that, this squadron became the first fighter squadron to be located at PAU Iswahjudi, before being followed by other squadrons.

In order to prepare the squadron's pilots, two types of training programs were held, at home and abroad. The overseas program was carried out by sending 4 pilots to Russia to learn to operate the MiG-21F as fighter pilots. This program started in 1961. The pilots sent were Air Captain Sukardi, First Air Lieutenant Jahman, First Air Lieutenant Sobirin Misbach and First Air Lieutenant Saputro. Two pilots, First Air Lieutenant Sobirin Misbach and First Air Lieutenant Saputro were sent by the Air Force to replace Second Air Lieutenant Mundung (grounded) after arriving in Russia for health reasons and Second Air Lieutenant Suganda who had to go home due to the lack of a pressure suit (flying suit) that fit his size. This flight suit is an anti-gravity suit worn by fighter pilots, and is now known as the G-suit. These pilots were trained at Lugowaya Air Base, which is located close to India.

From the start, this squadron has had the title of Fighter Intercept squadron in the 300th Operational Wing (Wing Ops) under the National Air Defense Command (Kohanudnas). The latest aircraft used at that time was the MiG-21 Fishbed which took part in Operation Trikora, Operation Dwikora and Operation Tumpas. The grounding of the MIG-21 Fishbed following a spare parts shortage in the late 1970s forced the Department of Defense and Security to look west to reactivate this air defense element. Australia donated 18 CAC Sabre aircraft, which were delivered in February 1973 and assigned to the 14th Air squadron at Iswahjudi Air Base. Six more Sabres were donated by Australia in 1976. The RAAF Sabre Advisory Unit was stationed at Iswahjudi between October 1972 and February 1975 to provide training to Indonesian air and ground personnel.

On 10 May 1974 the 14th Air Squadron became an organic element of the Fighter Intercept Unit Command (Kosatsergap) which was called the F-86 Saber Fighter Intercept Unit (Satsergap-86).

On 21 April 1980, the Indonesian Air Force received several F-5E/F Tiger II aircraft made by Northrop, USA which were transported by C-5A Galaxy aircraft in assembly form. The aircraft assembly was then rebuilt by Indonesian Air Force technicians under the supervision of Northrop. The F-5E/F Tiger II aircraft were then assigned to 14th Air Squadron on 5 May 1980 as fighter jet aircraft to replace the F-86 Saber aircraft which had declared their flying hours expired. With the arrival of the F-5E/F Tiger II aircraft, which are capable of flying at Mach 1.6 (speed of sound), the Indonesian Air Force has returned to the supersonic era like during the MiG-21 Fishbed era. Air operations that are often carried out are air defense operations. The joint training that has been participated in is Elang Malindo with Malaysia, Elang Indopura with Singapore, Elang Thainesia with Thailand, Elang Ausindo with Australia, and Cope West with the United States. The Indonesian Air Force's F-5E/F Tiger II has also made friendly visits to Thailand, Malaysia and Australia. In order to improve the performance and capabilities of the F-5E/F Tiger II aircraft, the Indonesian Air Force conducted a Modernization of Avionic Capability for Armament and Navigation (MACAN) program by sending one F-5E/F Tiger II aircraft to SABCA, Belgium to be upgraded. Avionics capabilities for its weapons and navigation. The successful modification of these two aircraft was continued in the form of mass production of other F-5E/F Tiger II aircraft of the 14th Air Squadron.

== Operations ==
=== 35 Years of Protecting the Republic of Indonesia, Tiger in Museum ===
Since its arrival on 21 April 1980, the first wave of the Indonesian Air Force's F-5 E/F Tiger II fighter fleet arrived at Iswahjudi Air Force Base, totaling eight units transported using the USAF Airlift Command's C-5 Galaxy. Two months later, on 5 July 1980 the C-5 Galaxy landed again carrying an F-5 E/F Tiger II to supplement its deficiencies. After 35 years of serving to guard and escort the Republic of Indonesia, the F-5 E/F Tiger II or what is known as the Macan (Tiger in Indonesian) was finally put into the museum collection of the Indonesian Air Force Central Museum Dirgantara Mandala Adisutjipto Air Force Base. Yogyakarta, which was inaugurated by Air Chief Marshal TNI Hadi Tjahjanto, S.IP., on Tuesday, April 25, 2017. Present on this occasion were members of the "Eagle Family" including Marshal TNI (Ret.) Djoko Suyanto, Marshal TNI (Ret.) Imam Sufaat, TNI Marshal (Ret.) Agus Supriatna, former F-5 E/F Tiger II pilots, former technicians, and those who still fly in civil aviation.
