= Sarangan, Indonesia =

Sarangan
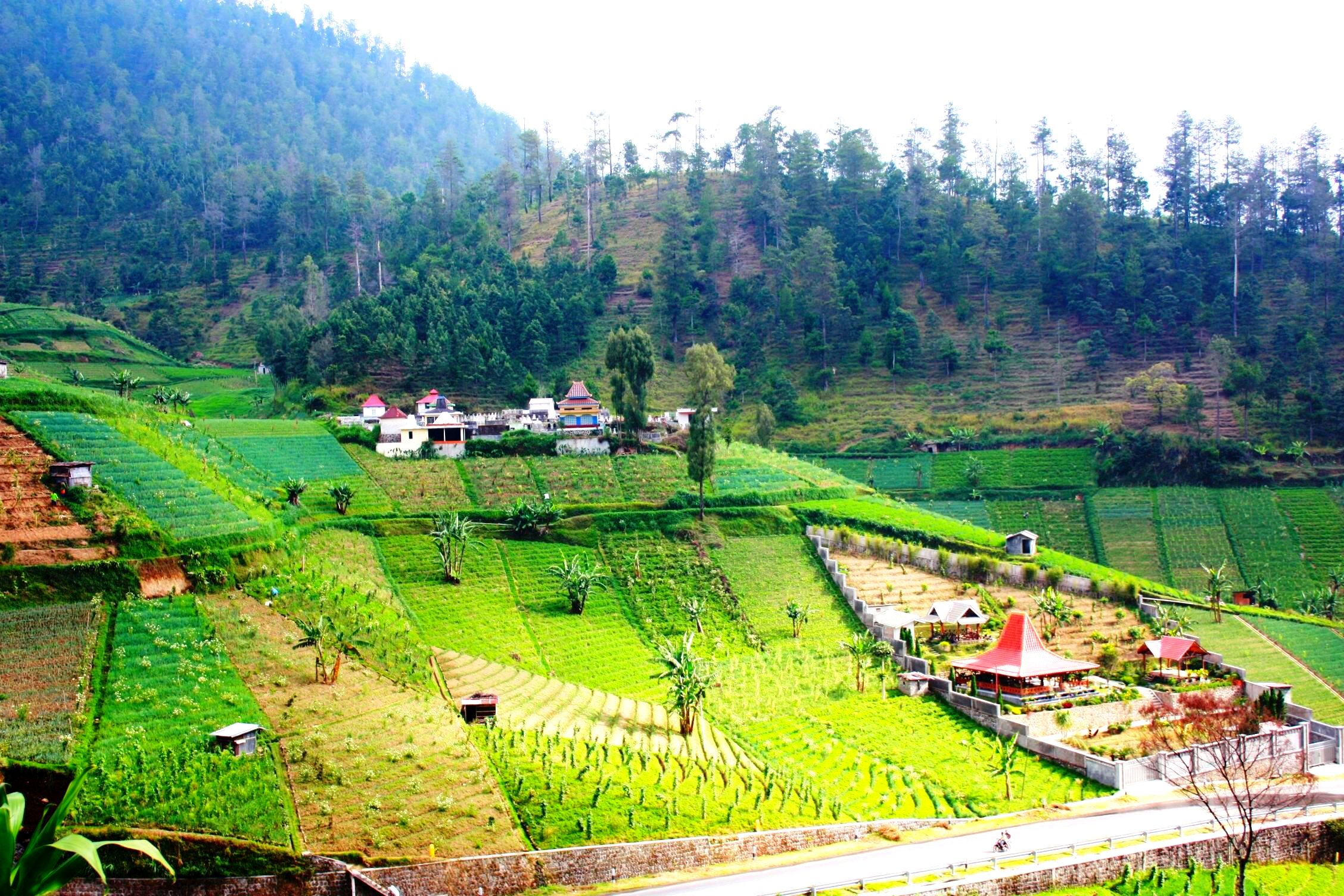
- Open greenspace in Sarangan

- Location in East Java and Indonesia Sarangan (Indonesia)
- Coordinates: 7°40′9.4512″S 111°13′9.0336″E
- Country: Indonesia
- Province: East Java
- Regency: Magetan Regency
- District: Plaosan District
- Elevation: 4,639 ft (1,414 m)

Population (2010)
  - Total: 3,391
- Time zone: UTC+7 (Western Indonesia Time)

Sarangan (Indonesian pronunciation: [saˈraŋan]) is an urban village in Plaosan District, Magetan Regency in East Java Province. Its population is 3391.

== Climate ==
Sarangan has a subtropical highland climate (Cfb). It has moderate rainfall from June to September and heavy to very heavy rainfall from October to May.

Climate data for Sarangan
Month	Jan	Feb	Mar	Apr	May	Jun	Jul	Aug	Sep	Oct	Nov	Dec	Year
Mean daily maximum °C (°F)	17.0 (62.6)	17.2 (63.0)	17.4 (63.3)	17.2 (63.0)	17.3 (63.1)	16.7 (62.1)	16.1 (61.0)	16.4 (61.5)	16.9 (62.4)	17.5 (63.5)	17.3 (63.1)	17.2 (63.0)	17.0 (62.6)
Daily mean °C (°F)	13.3 (55.9)	13.4 (56.1)	13.7 (56.7)	13.3 (55.9)	13.2 (55.8)	12.5 (54.5)	11.6 (52.9)	11.9 (53.4)	12.3 (54.1)	13.1 (55.6)	13.7 (56.7)	13.5 (56.3)	13.0 (55.3)
Mean daily minimum °C (°F)	9.7 (49.5)	9.6 (49.3)	10.1 (50.2)	9.5 (49.1)	9.1 (48.4)	8.4 (47.1)	7.2 (45.0)	7.4 (45.3)	7.8 (46.0)	8.8 (47.8)	10.1 (50.2)	9.8 (49.6)	9.0 (48.1)
Average precipitation mm (inches)	529 (20.8)	453 (17.8)	492 (19.4)	312 (12.3)	208 (8.2)	88 (3.5)	80 (3.1)	56 (2.2)	65 (2.6)	156 (6.1)	365 (14.4)	428 (16.9)	3,232 (127.3)
Source: Climate-Data.org
