= Maospati =

Coordinates: 7°36′S 111°26′E

Maospati's location within Java

Maospati is small city (district level) located along National Highway Route 30 in East Java, Indonesia.

== Geography ==
The northwesternern part of Maospati is mostly dominated by lowlands and hills, with an elevation of 74-185 meters above sea level.

=== Boundaries ===
The boundaries of the Maospati district are as follows:

North	Barat District, Karangjero District, and Karas District
East	Jiwan District, Madiun District
South	Bendo District
West	Karas District, Sukomoro District

== Administrative Division ==
The Maospati district consists of 3 sub-districts and 12 villages, which are:

=== Villages ===
1. Sumberejo
2. Suratmajan
3. Klagen Gambiran
4. Ronowijayan
5. Pandeyan
6. Ngunjuung
7. Sugihwaras
8. Tanjungsepreh
9. Gulun
10. Malang
11. Sempol
12. Pesu

=== Sub-districts ===
1. Kraton
2. Maospati
3. Mranggen

== Demographics ==
Maospati is a densely populated district in the Magetan regency with a population of 46.763 and an area of 25,26 km^{2}, with the density of the population itself being approximately 1,851 people per km^{2}. The densely populated areas in this sub-district includes the Maospati, Kraton, and Mranggen areas, as well as along National Highway Route 30 towards Madiun.

The majority of the workforce in this district works earns a living as Civil Servants, Military personnel, law enforcers, traders, entrepreneurs, and farmers. The diversity of professions are due to the district's strategic location; the presence of the Iswahjudi Air Force Base contributes to the significant amount of military personnel. Additionally, the district that's strategically located along South Java makes trading a popular profession. Despite that, the farming sector remains the main profession especially in the northern area of this sub-district.

== Transportation ==
Maospati has a Maospati Terminal for intercity bus transportation.

== Potential ==
The mainstay potential of Maospati District includes:

1. Roof Tile Craft Center in Winong Village
2. Tofu Factory Business Center in Suratmajan Village
3. Brick Craft Center in Klagen Gambiran Village

As a trading center, the Maospati District is served by two large-scale fruit markets and other supporting markets such as:

1. Maospati Market 1
2. Maospati Market 2 and Superior Products Market (PPU)
3. Maospati Animal Market
4. Winong Market
5. Sumberejo Market
6. Pahing Market (Only open during Pahing market day)

Modern markets:

1. Via Swalayan (Jl. Raya Maospati - Barat) Maospati subdistrict
2. MM Maospati (Jl. Raya Maospati - Madiun) Kraton subdistrict
3. Ada Swalayan (Jl. Raya Maospati - Barat) Maospati subdistrict
4. Yudi Mart (Jl. Kaswari 1 Lanud Iswahjudi) Maospati subdistrict
5. Embahe Murah Maospati (Jl. Raya Maospati - Barat) Maospati subdistrict
6. Sumber Murah Fashion (Jl. Agung) Maospati subdistrict
7. MM Fashion (Jl. Raya Maospati - Madiun) Maospati subdistrict
8. Indomaret Maospati (Jl. Raya Maospati - Madiun) Maospati subdistrict
9. Indomaret Sugihwaras (Jl. Raya Maospati - Magetan) Sugihwaras village
10. Indomaret Gambiran (Jl. Raya Maospati - Madiun) Klagen Gambiran Village
11. Alfamart Mranggen (Jl. Raya Maospati - Barat) Mranggen subdistrict
12. Alfamart Terminal Maospati (Jl. Raya Maospati - Ngawi) Malang Village

== Education ==
The Maospati district is a district with a very good quality of education in the Magetan Regency.

The junior high schools in Maospati are:

1. State Junior High School 1 Maospati (SMP Negeri 1 Maospati)
2. State Junior High School 2 Maospati (SMP Negeri 2 Maospati)
3. State Junior High School 3 Maospati (SMP Negeri 3 Maospati)
4. Maospati Pomosda Middle School (SMP Pomosda Maospati)
5. Darul Abab Maospati Middle School (SMP Darul Abab Maospati)
6. Angkasa Maospati Middle School (SMP Angkasa Maospati)
7. Persatuan Maospati Middle School (SMP Persatuan Maospati)

High schools/vocational schools in Maospati includes:

1. State High School 1 Maospati (SMA Negeri 1 Maospati)
2. PGRI 1 High School Maospati (SMA PGRI 1 Maospati)
3. Maospati Aviation Vocational School (SMK Penerbangan Angkasa Maospati)
4. Bakti Indonesia Medika Maospati Health Vocational School (SMK Kesehatan Bakti Indonesia Medika Maospati)
5. Adi Dharma PGRI Maospati Vocational School (SMK Adi Dharma PGRI Maospati)
6. Maaopati Persatuan Vocational School (SMK Pesatuan Maospati)
7. Dr. Nugroho Vocational School Maospati (SMK Dr. Nugroho Maospati)

There is a university in the region, namely:

1. College of Teacher Training and Education Sciences Dr. Nugroho (STKIP Dr. Nugroho)

== Hermitage ==
The Sendang Kamal Inscription is located in the Maospati district, believed to date from the Majapahit era. Located in Kraton Village, the inscription consists of three inscriptions written in Javanese script that are only faintly legible. Near the inscription, there is also a spring called Sendang Nirwana.
