= CAC Sabre =

Australian variant of the North American F-86F Sabre jet using Rolls-Royce engines

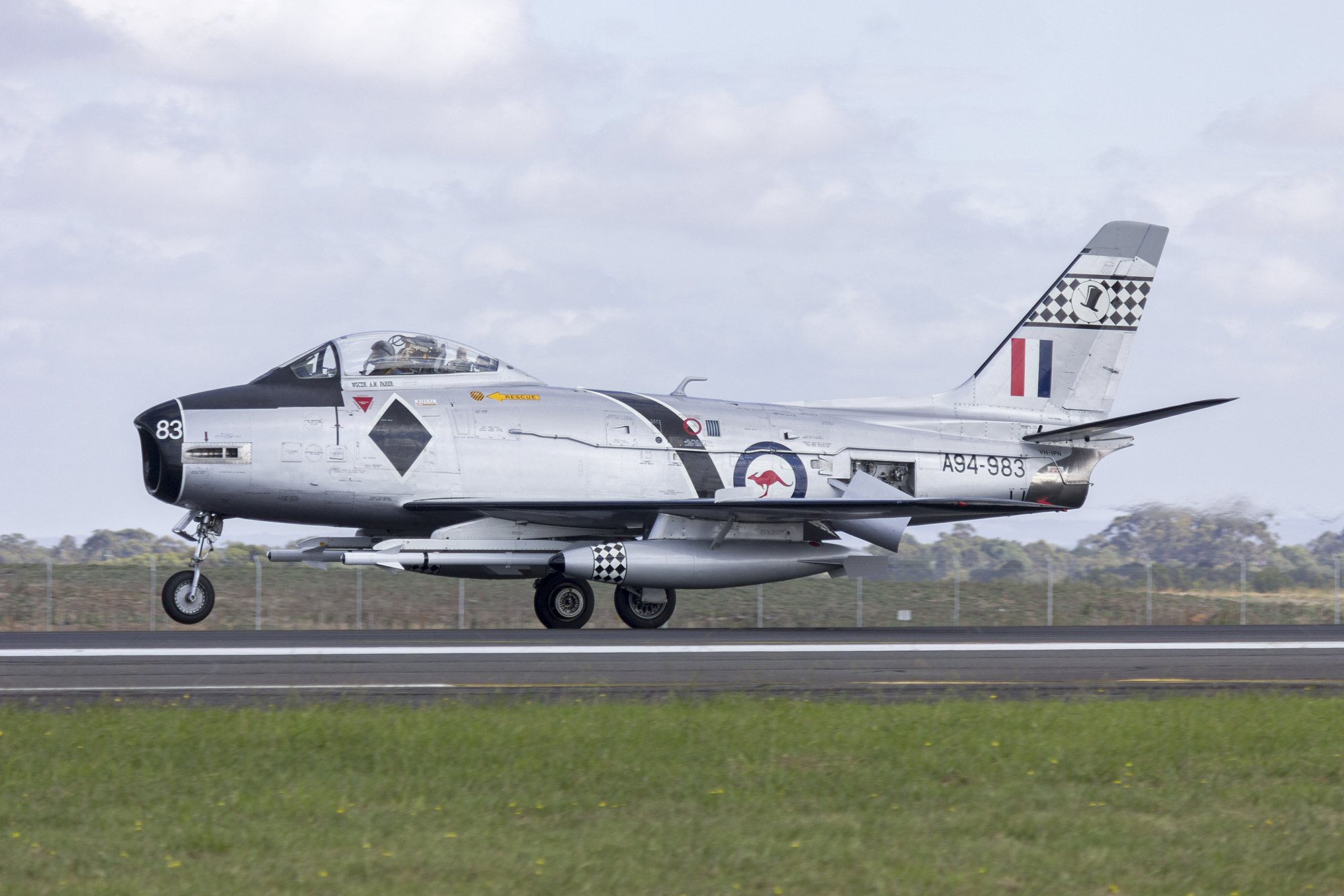
- CAC Sabre

General information
- Type: Fighter aircraft
- National origin: Australia / United States
- Manufacturer: Commonwealth Aircraft Corporation
- Primary users: Royal Australian Air Force Indonesian Air Force; Royal Malaysian Air Force
- Number built: 112

History
- Manufactured: 1953–1961
- Introduction date: 1954
- First flight: 3 August 1953
- Retired: 1971 (Royal Australian Air Force); 1982 (Indonesian Air Force)
- Developed from: North American F-86 Sabre

The CAC Sabre, sometimes known as the Avon Sabre or CA-27, is an Australian variant of the North American Aviation F-86F Sabre fighter aircraft. The F-86F was redesigned and built by the Commonwealth Aircraft Corporation (CAC). Equipping five Royal Australian Air Force (RAAF) squadrons, the type saw action in the Malayan Emergency in the late 1950s and was employed for air defence in Malaysia and Thailand in the 1960s. Ex-RAAF models also saw service with the Royal Malaysian Air Force and the Indonesian Air Force.

== Development ==
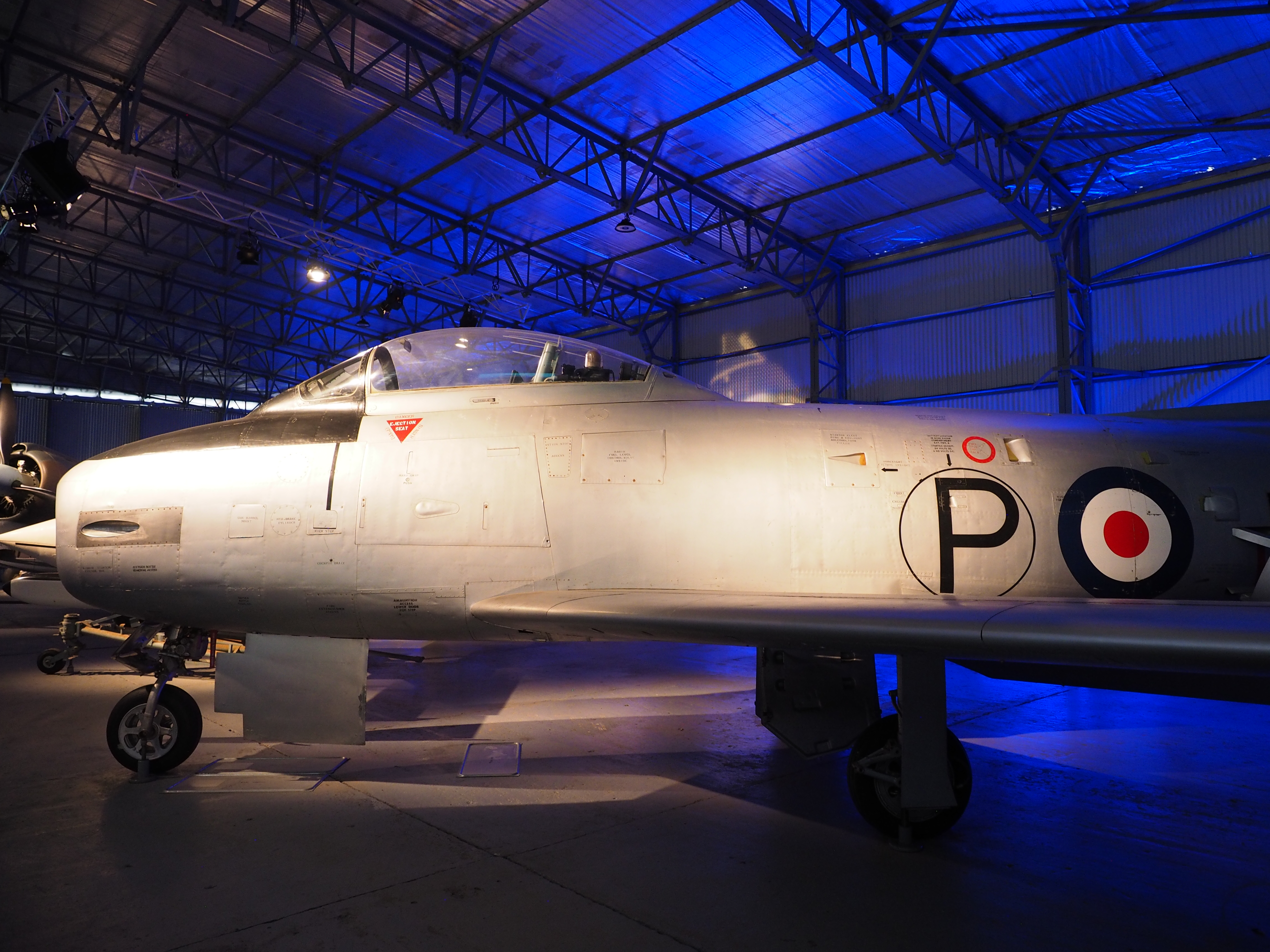
The first prototype CAC Sabre, preserved at the RAAF Museum

In 1951, CAC obtained a licence agreement to build the F-86F Sabre, in response to the cancelled CAC CA-23 project. In a major departure from the North American blueprint, it was decided that the CA-27 would be powered by a licence-built version of the Rolls-Royce Avon R.A.7, which was planned to be also used in the CAC CA-23 previously, rather than the General Electric J47. In theory, the Avon was capable of more than double the maximum thrust and double the thrust-to-weight ratio of the US engine. This necessitated a re-design of the fuselage, as the Avon was shorter, wider and lighter than the J47. Because of the engine change the type is sometimes referred to as the Avon Sabre. To accommodate the Avon, over 60 percent of the fuselage was altered and there was a 25 percent increase in the size of the air intake. Another major revision was in replacing the F-86F's six machine guns with two 30mm ADEN cannon, while other changes were also made to the cockpit and to provide an increased fuel capacity.

The prototype aircraft (designated CA-26 Sabre) first flew on 3 August 1953. The production aircraft were designated the CA-27 Sabre and first deliveries to the Royal Australian Air Force began in 1954. The first batch of aircraft were powered by the Avon 20 engine and were designated the Sabre Mk 30. Between 1957 and 1958 this batch had the wing slats removed and were redesignated Sabre Mk 31. These Sabres were supplemented by 20 new-build aircraft. The last batch of aircraft were designated Sabre Mk 32 and used the Avon 26 engine, of which 69 were built up to 1961.

== Operational history ==
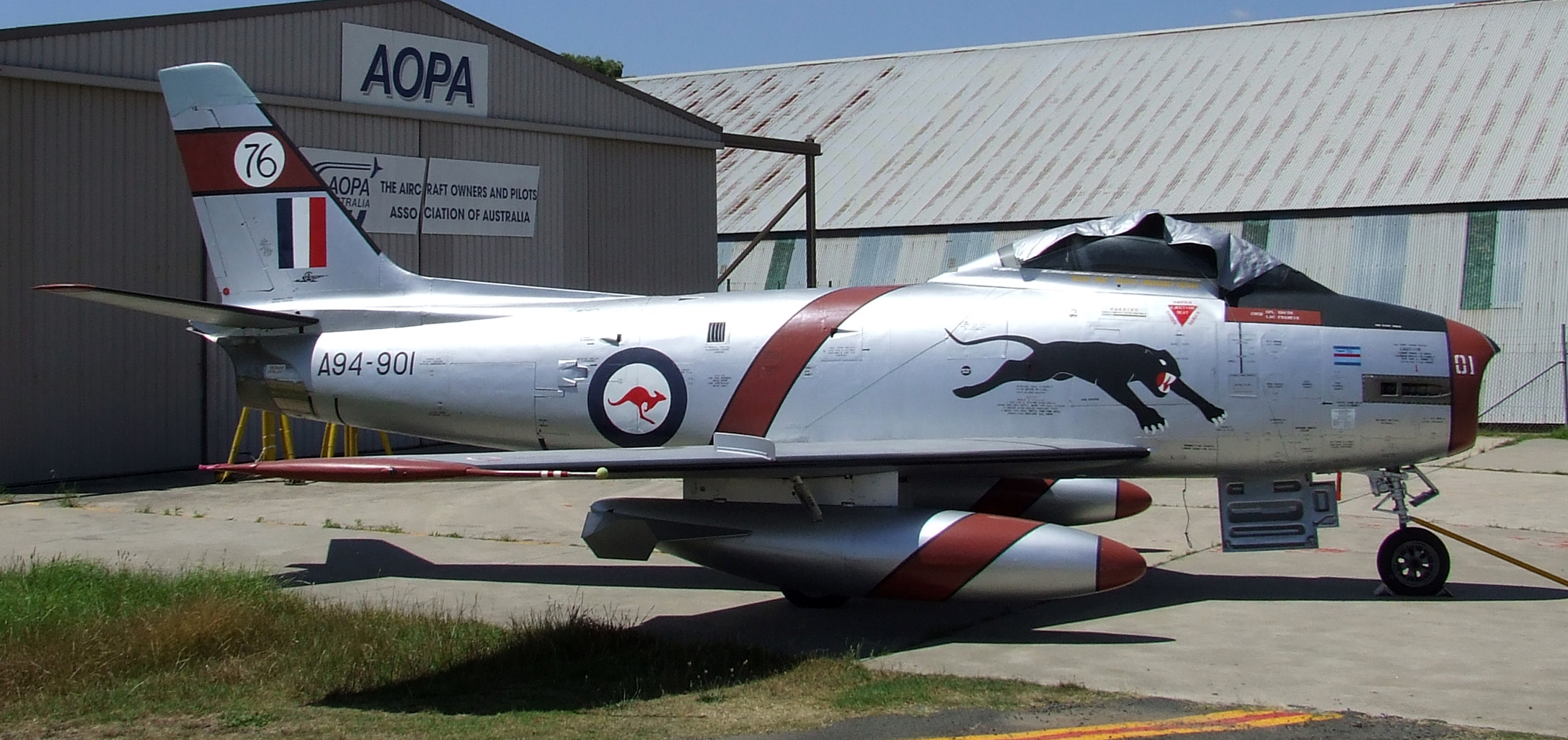
A94-901 (Mk 30), the first production CAC Sabre, in the colours of the "Black Panthers" aerobatics team of No. 76 Squadron

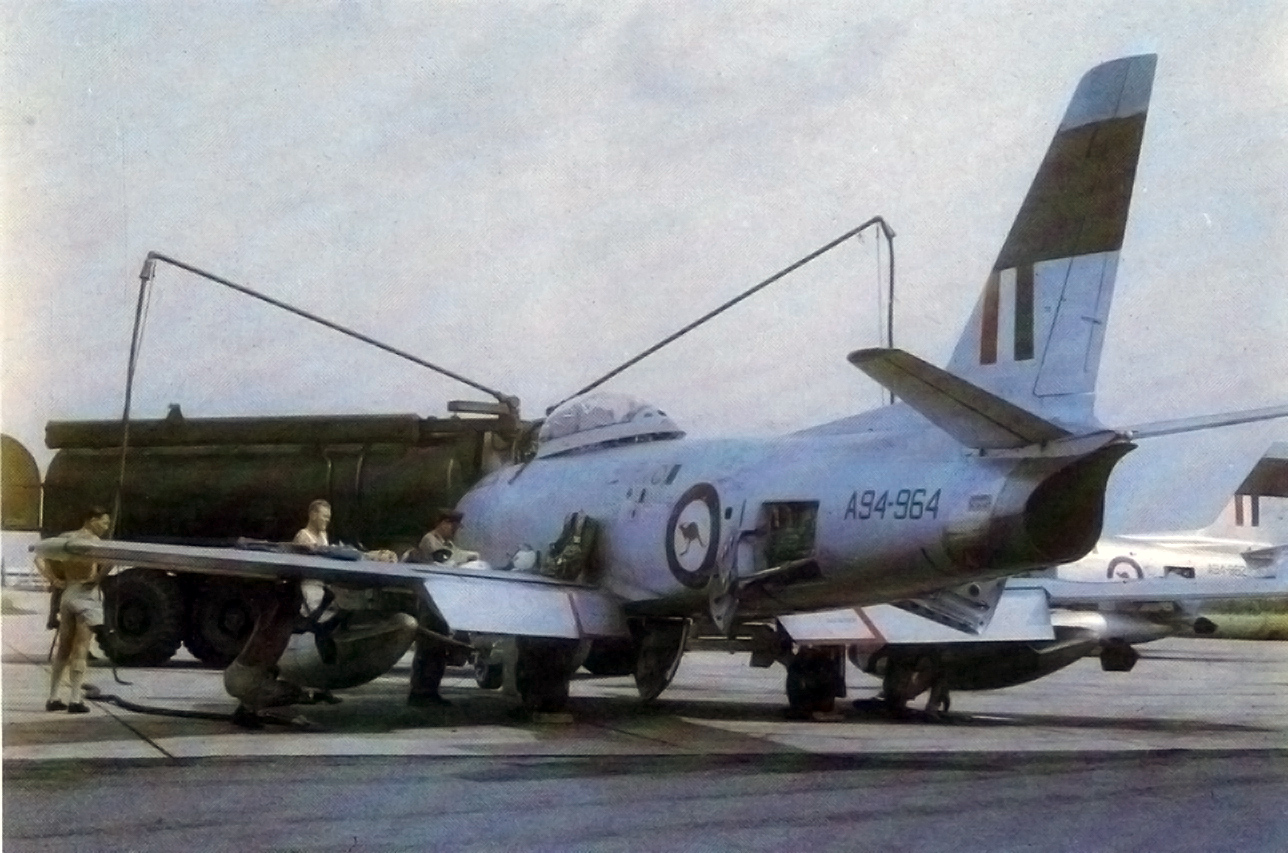
A94-964 and A94-982 (Mk 32), Thailand, c. 1962

The RAAF operated the CA-27 from 1954 to 1971. The Aircraft Research and Development Unit (ARDU) received the first example in August 1954; re-delivered to No. 2 (Fighter) Operational Training Unit (2 OTU) in November. Over the next six years the Sabres progressively equipped No. 75 Squadron RAAF (75 Sqn), No. 3 Squadron RAAF (3 Sqn), No. 77 Squadron RAAF (77 Sqn) and No. 76 Squadron RAAF (76Sqn).

From 1958 to 1960, CAC Sabres of No. 78 Wing RAAF (78 Wing), comprising 3 Sqn and 77 Sqn, undertook several ground attack sorties against communist insurgents in the Federation of Malaya, during the Malayan Emergency. Following the Emergency, they remained in Malaysia at RMAF Butterworth (RAAF Butterworth). Armed with Sidewinder missiles, the Sabres were responsible for regional air defence during the Konfrontasi between Indonesia and Malaysia from 1963 until 1966, though no combat took place. Between October and December 1965, a detachment of six Sabres, initially from 77 Sqn and later from 3 Sqn, was based at Labuan to conduct combat patrols over the Indonesian–Malaysian border on Borneo.

In 1962, a detachment of eight CAC Sabres, which was later expanded and designated No. 79 Squadron RAAF (79 Sqn), was sent from RMAF Butterworth to Ubon Royal Thai Air Force Base (RAAF Ubon), Thailand, to assist the Thai and Laotian governments in actions against communist insurgents. Australia and Thailand were allies of South Vietnam and the United States during the Vietnam War; 79 Sqn was responsible for local air defence at Ubon, where United States Air Force attack and bomber aircraft were based. The squadron never engaged North Vietnamese aircraft or ground forces. Two Sabres were lost to engine failure in Thailand, in September 1964 and January 1968. 79 Sqn ceased operations and was deactivated in July 1968.

The RAAF began re-equipping with the Dassault Mirage III in 1964. The last Sabres in Australian service, operated by No. 5 Operational Training Unit RAAF (5 OTU), were retired in July 1971.

Former RAAF CAC Sabres were operated by 11 Squadron Royal Malaysian Air Force (11 Sqn RMAF) between 1969 and 1972. Following the establishment of better relations with Indonesia, 23 CAC Sabres were donated to the Indonesian Air Force (TNI-AU) between 1973 and 1975, and operated by 14th Air Squadron TNI-AU; five of these were former Malaysian aircraft. The RAAF Sabre Advisory Unit was stationed in Indonesia between October 1972 and February 1975 to provide training to Indonesian air and ground crew.

== Variants ==
CA-26 Sabre
Prototype, one built.
CA-27 Sabre Mk 30
Production version powered by the Avon 20 engine and fitted with leading-edge slats; 22 built.
CA-27 Sabre Mk 31
Version similar to Mk 30 but with an extended leading edge; 20 built and surviving Mk 30s converted to this standard.
CA-27 Sabre Mk 32
Final production batch with underwing pylons and Avon 26 engine; 69 built.

== Operators ==
Australia

- Royal Australian Air Force
  - No. 3 Squadron
  - No. 75 Squadron
  - No. 76 Squadron
  - No. 77 Squadron
  - No. 79 Squadron
  - No. 2 Operational Conversion Unit
  - No. 5 Operational Training Unit

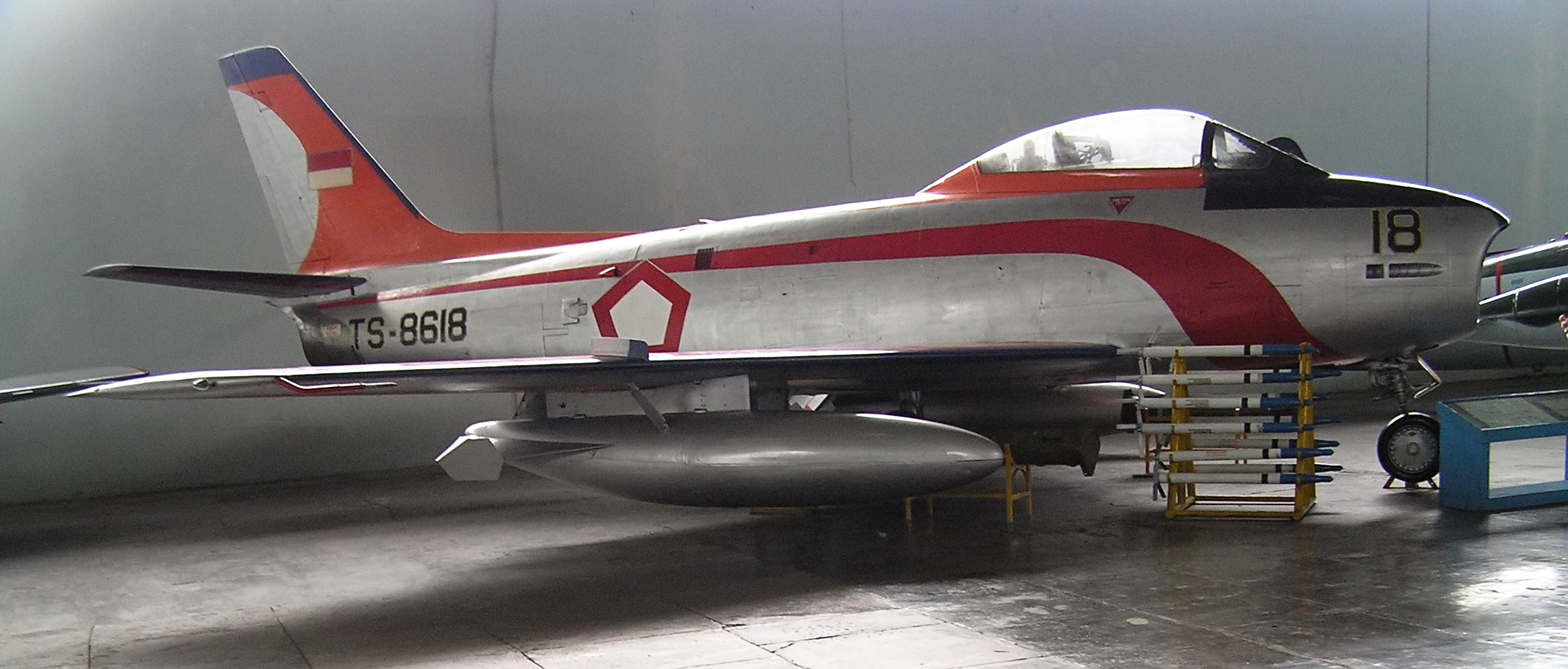
Mk 32 (TS-8603, RAAF A94-368) in Indonesian markings at the Indonesian Air Force Museum

Indonesia

- Indonesian Air Force

Acquired 18 CAC Sabres from Australia and 5 from Malaysia.

  - 14th Air Squadron

Malaysia

- Royal Malaysian Air Force

Acquired 18 CAC Sabres from Australia.

  - No. 11 Squadron

== Preserved aircraft ==
=== Airworthy CAC Sabres ===
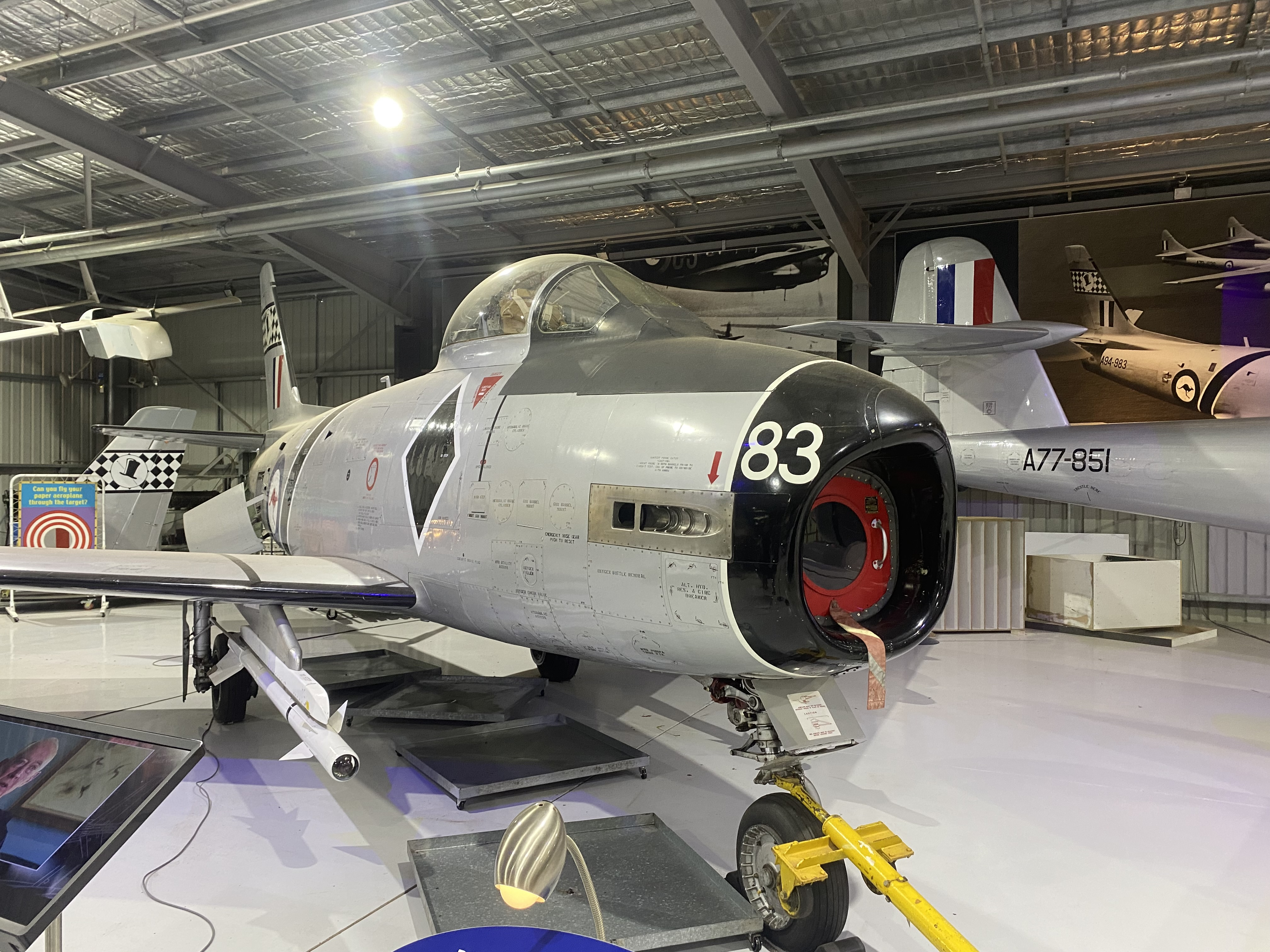
RAAF CA-27 Sabre, A94-983 seen in 2024

In Australia, there are only two former RAAF-owned Sabres (A94-983 and A94-352) that have been restored to flying condition, A94-983 is at the Temora Aviation Museum, New South Wales – ownership was transferred to the RAAF in July 2019 and it is operated by the Air Force Heritage Squadron (Temora Historic Flight). A94-352 is currently owned privately by Sqn Ldr Jeff Trappett (RAAF retired) and is stored at Latrobe Regional Airport. (A94-907 is also at Latrobe Valley being used as a source of parts in the restoration of A94-352.)

In 1973 A94-352 crashed on takeoff at Ngurah Rai International Airport, Bali, on its delivery flight to the Indonesian Air Force. The engine was removed and returned to CAC for assessment. On 18 February 1974 a submission was made and approval given on 14 March 1975 for free transfer of some spare parts to the Warbirds Aviation Museum.

== Specifications (Mk 32) ==
Data from Meteor, Sabre and Mirage in Australian Service

General characteristics

- Length: 37 ft 6 in (11.43 m)
- Wingspan: 37 ft 1 in (11.30 m)
- Height: 14 ft (4.3 m)
- Wing area: 302.3 sq ft (28.08 m^{2})
- Airfoil: root: NACA 0009-64 mod; tip: NACA 0009-64 mod
- Empty weight: 12,000 lb (5,443 kg)
- Gross weight: 16,000 lb (7,257 kg)
- Max takeoff weight: 21,210 lb (9,621 kg)
- Powerplant: 1 × Rolls-Royce Avon RA.26 turbojet engine, 7,500 lbf (33 kN) thrust

Performance

- Maximum speed: 700 mph (1,100 km/h, 610 kn)
- Range: 1,153 mi (1,856 km, 1,002 nmi)
- Service ceiling: 52,000 ft (16,000 m)
- Rate of climb: 12,000 ft/min (61 m/s) at sea level

Armament

- Guns: 2× 30 mm ADEN cannons with 162 rounds per gun
- Rockets: 24× Hispano SURA R80 80mm rockets
- Missiles: 2× AIM-9 Sidewinder Air-to-air missiles
- Bombs: 5,300 lb (2,400 kg) of payload on four external hardpoints; bombs were usually only mounted on the inner two pylons, as the outer pair of pylons were wet-plumbed for 2× 200 imperial gallons (910 L) drop tanks to give the CAC Sabre a useful range. A wide variety of bombs could be carried with maximum standard loadout being 2 x 1,000 lb (450 kg) bombs plus 2 drop tanks. As an air superiority fighter, however, the air-to-ground mission loadout was not typically employed.

== See also ==
Related development

- North American F-86 Sabre
- Canadair Sabre

Aircraft of comparable role, configuration, and era

- CAC CA-23
- Dassault Mystère IV
- de Havilland Venom
- Hawker Hunter
- Mikoyan-Gurevich MiG-17
- Republic F-84F Thunderstreak
- Saab 32 Lansen
- Sukhoi Su-9
- Supermarine Swift
