= Magetan Regency =

Regency in East Java, Indonesia

Magetan Regency Kabupaten Magetan
- Regency

Other transcription(s)
  - Javanese: Magêtan (Gêdrig) ماڮۤتان (Pégon) ꦩꦒꦼꦠꦤ꧀ (Hånåcåråkå)
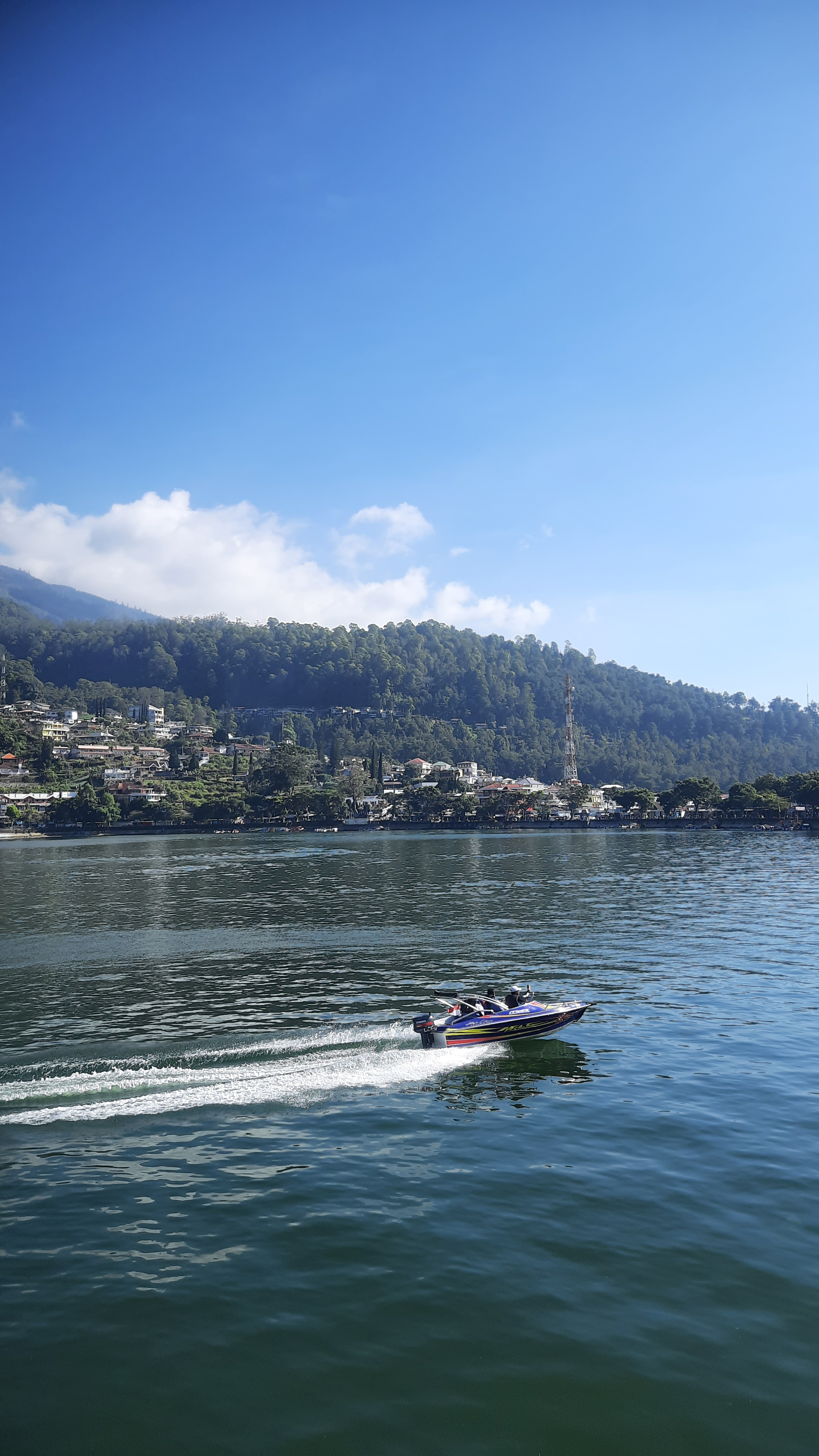
- Sarangan Lake

- Coat of arms
- Motto(s): Memayu Hayuning Bawana Suka Ambangun (Embellish the beauty of the world by fondness in development)
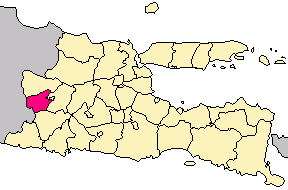
- Location within East Java

- Location in Java and Indonesia Magetan Regency (Indonesia)
- Coordinates: 7°39′S 111°22′E
- Country: Indonesia
- Province: East Java
- Anniversary: 12 October 1675
- Capital: Magetan

Government
  - Regent: Nanik Endang Rusminarti (Gerindra Party)
  - Vice Regent: Suyatni Priasmoro

Area
  - Total: 688.84 km^{2} (265.96 sq mi)
  - Land: 688.84 km^{2} (265.96 sq mi)
- Highest elevation: 1,300 m (4,300 ft)
- Lowest elevation: 500 m (1,600 ft)

Population (mid 2025 estimate)
  - Total: 694,841
  - Density: 1,008.7/km^{2} (2,612.6/sq mi)
- Time zone: UTC+7 (IWST)
- Postal code: 633xx - 633xx
- Area code: (+62) 351
- Website: magetan.go.id

Magetan Regency is a regency (kabupaten) of East Java Province, Indonesia. It is an inland regency, and lies in the west of the province, adjoining Central Java Province. It covered an area of 688.84 km^{2} and had a population of 620,442 at the 2010 Census and 670,812 at the 2020 Census; the official estimate as at mid 2025 was 694,841 (comprising 341,109 males and 353,732 females). The administrative headquarters is in the town of Magetan.

The poet Iman Budhi Santosa and L. J. A. Schoonheyt, the camp doctor at Boven-Digoel concentration camp in the 1930s, were born there.

== Administrative districts ==
Magetan Regency consists of eighteen districts (kecamatan), tabulated below with their areas and population totals from the 2010 Census and the 2020 Census, together with the official estimates as of mid 2025. The table also includes the locations of the district administrative centres, the number of administrative villages in each district (totaling 207 rural desa and 28 urban kelurahan), and their postal codes.

Kode Wilayah	Name of District (kecamatan)	Area in km^{2}	Pop'n Census 2010	Pop'n Census 2020	Pop'n Estimate mid 2025	Admin centre	No. of villages	Post codes
35.20.01	Poncol	51.31	28,778	31,062	32,274	Alastuwo	8 ^{(a)}	63362
35.20.02	Parang	71.64	38,663	43,273	46,515	Parang	13 ^{(a)}	64471
35.20.03	Lembeyan	54.85	36,685	41,369	43,341	Lembeyan Kulon	10 ^{(a)}	63372
35.20.04	Takeran	25.46	35,738	38,488	39,281	Takeran	12 ^{(a)}	63381
35.20.17	Nguntoronadi	16.72	19,231	20,903	21,807	Nguntoronadi	9	63383
35.20.05	Kawedanan	39.45	38,998	40,939	42,484	Kawedanan	20 ^{(b)}	63382
35.20.06	Magetan (town)	21.41	43,008	45,235	45,240	Ringinagung	14 ^{(c)}	63311: 63319
35.20.16	Ngariboyo	39.13	34,317	38,373	39,747	Ngariboyo	12	63351 ^{(d)}
35.20.07	Plaosan	66.09	47,848	50,735	53,133	Plaosan	15 ^{(e)}	63361
35.20.18	Sidorejo	39.15	25,019	27,218	28,999	Sidorejo	10	63361
35.20.08	Panekan	64.23	49,116	56,599	59,041	Panekan	17 ^{(a)}	63319; 63352; 63361
35.20.09	Sukomoro	33.05	28,884	31,715	33,319	Tinap	14 ^{(a)}	63391
35.20.10	Bendo	42.90	37,923	40,409	41,857	Bendo	16 ^{(a)}	63384
35.20.11	Maospati	25.26	44,316	45,400	46,492	Maospati	15 ^{(f)}	63392
35.20.13	Karangrejo	15.15	22,762	24,089	24,681	Prampelan	13 ^{(g)}	63395
35.20.14	Karas	35.29	37,059	39,868	40,211	Karas	11	63393
35.20.12	Barat	22.72	28,575	30,081	30,647	Mangge	14 ^{(h)}	63395 ^{(i)}
35.20.15	Kartoharjo	25.03	23,522	25,056	25,772	Kartoharjo	12	63394
	Totals	688.84	620,442	670,812	694,841	Magetan	235	

Notes: (a) including one kelurahan, the district admin centre. (b) including 3 kelurahan (Kawedanan, Rejosari and Sampung).
(c) comprising 9 kelurahan (Bulukerto, Kepolorejo, Kebonagung, Magetan, Mangkujayan, Selosari, Sukowinangun, Tawanganom and Tambran) and 5 desa.
(d) except for the village of Mojopurno, which has a postcode of 63361. (e) including 2 kelurahan (Plaosan and Sarangan).
(f) including 3 kelurahan (Kraton, Maospati and Mranggen). (g) including 2 kelurahan (Karangrejo and Manisrejo).
(h) including 2 kelurahan (Mangge and Tebon). (i) except the village of Banjarejo, which has a postcode of 63137.

== Climate ==
Magetan has a tropical climate. Significant rainfall in most of the months of the year, and the short dry season have little effect. This location is classified as Am by Köppen and Geiger. The average annual temperature is 25^{o} C. Within a year the average rainfall is 2045 mm.

=== Climate ===
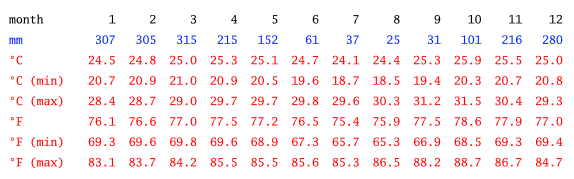
Climate Data for Magetan in a year

Climate Data for Magetan

=== Wind speed ===
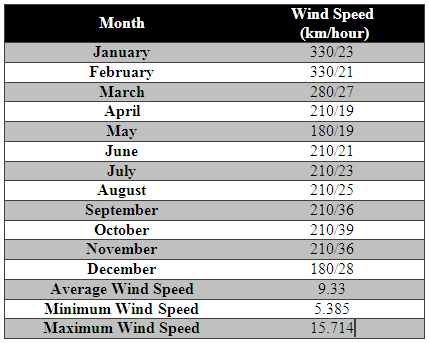
Wind Speed Data for Magetan

=== Humidity ===
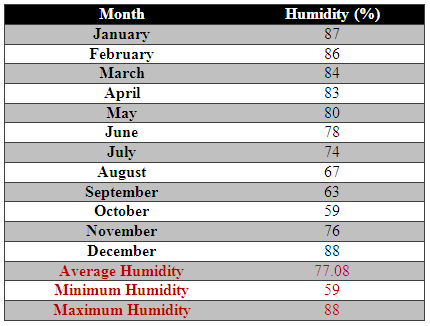
Humidity Data for Magetan

== Notable places ==
- Mount Lawu
- Cetho Temple
