= John Farley (pilot) =

British fighter pilot (1933–2018)

John Frederick Farley
- Born: 17 April 1933; Hastings, East Sussex
- Died: 13 June 2018 (aged 85)
- Military career
- Allegiance: United Kingdom
- Branch: Royal Air Force
- Service years: 1958–1967
- Units: No. 4 Squadron RAF: Central Flying School
- Conflicts
- Awards: Order of the British Empire; Air Force Cross
- Other work: Test pilot Author

John Frederick Farley, OBE, AFC (17 April 1933 – 13 June 2018) was a British fighter pilot and test pilot for the Royal Air Force who was made an Officer of the Order of the British Empire for his work in aviation. As a test pilot, he was heavily involved in the development of the Hawker Siddeley P.1127 and latterly the BAE Harrier. During his aviation career Farley flew over 80 different types of aircraft and was the first British pilot to fly the Mikoyan MiG-29.

== Early life ==
Farley gained his formative education at Hastings Grammar School.

== Career ==
=== Apprenticeship ===
John Farley joined the Royal Aircraft Establishment, Farnborough, as a student apprentice in 1950. This saw him fly as a flight test observer on various programmes, leading to him developing a professional relationship with numerous test pilots. Having been introduced to Group Captain Sammy Wroath, who was aware of Farley's technical ability, he was encouraged to learn to fly. Farley chose to join the Royal Air Force rather than to attend civilian flying college at Cranfield with an aim to becoming a test pilot.

=== Flying career ===
As an aeronautical engineer and exceptional pilot, it came as a disappointment to Farley that following the 1957 Defence White Paper produced by Duncan Sandys, he had to settle for a ground tour.

This was despite having passed out from the Operational Conversion Unit on the Hawker Hunter. Eager to fly, this led to Farley sneaking into the office of the day fighter poster and highlighting his name on some of the posting forms whilst the officer was out playing sport.

His reward was a posting to No. 4 Squadron RAF at RAF Jever, West Germany, for a tour on the Hunter.

This was followed by a posting to the Central Flying School at RAF Cranwell where he became an instructor on the Jet Provost.

=== Test Pilot ===
In 1963 he was rewarded with the slot he most desired, that of a place at the Empire Test Pilots' School at RAE Farnborough, completing the course with a distinguished pass.

He was posted to the Aerodynamics Research Flight at RAE Bedford which saw Farley renew his association with Ralph Maltby, who had been his apprentice master at the beginning of his career. During 1964 Farley was first introduced to the Hawker Siddeley P.1127 (later named the Harrier) which in turn led to 19 years of Harrier test flying.

He then joined Hawker Aviationat BAe Dunsfold, as a company test pilot in 1967 He was appointed Deputy Chief Test Pilot in 1971 and Chief Test Pilot in 1978.

In this capacity he began work on the development of the Sea Harrier, being the first pilot to test fly the aircraft (FRS.1 - XZ450) on August 20, 1978, following which, ten days later, Farley also became the first person to undertake a take off with the aid of the 'ski-jump'.

Farley was then able to demonstrate the Sea Harrier to the general public at the 1978 Farnborough Airshow.

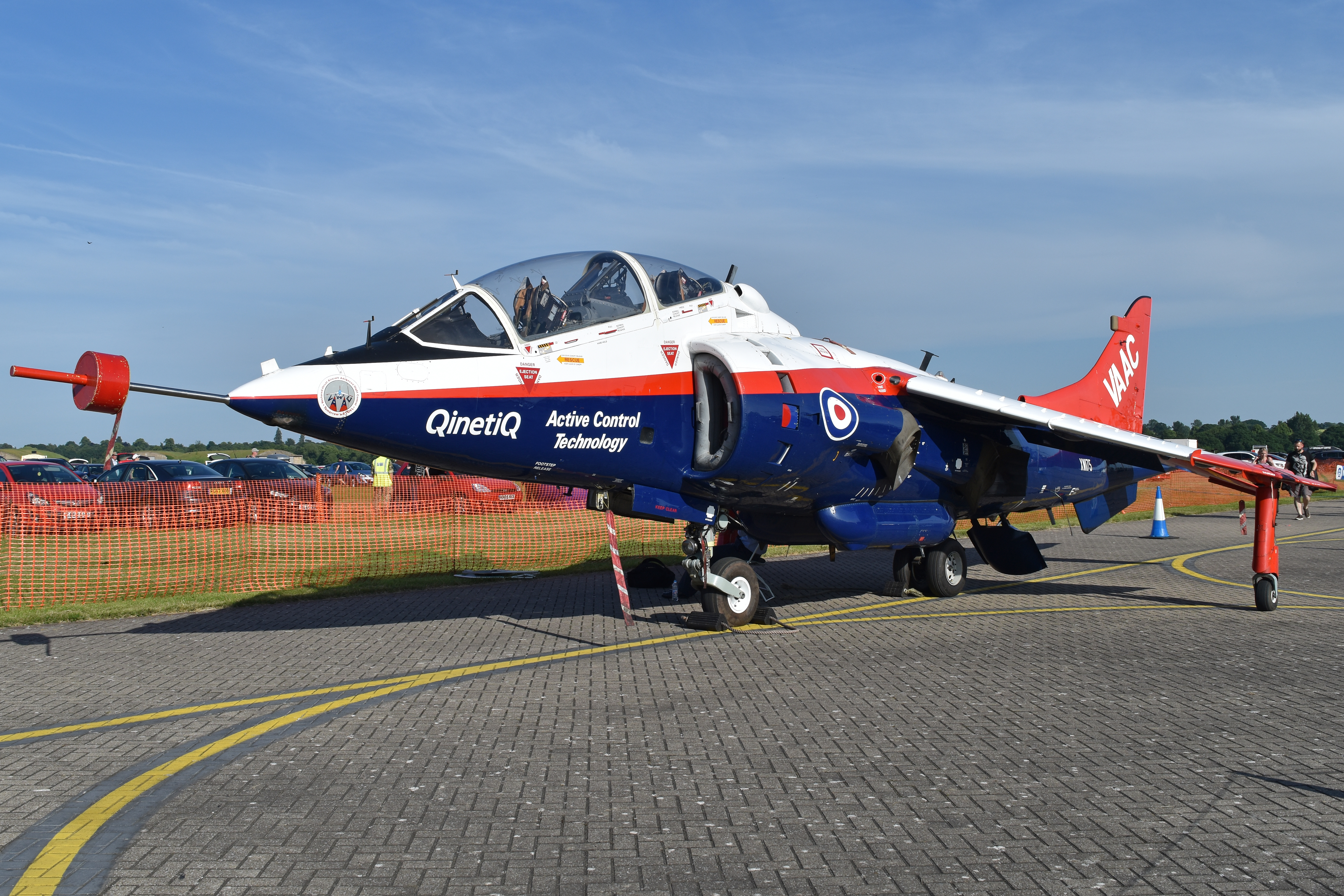
Hawker Siddeley Harrier T.4(mod) XW175

One particularly challenging aspect of the test flying programme on the Harrier revolved around the phenomenon which came to be known as Intake Momentum Drag Yaw. This was an aspect in which the mass of air ingested by the intake of the engine during a crosswind could lead to a state of uncontrolled roll. Farley deliberately flew right into the edge of this condition repeatedly, so that a system to counter it could be developed.

He was involved in the conversion course onto the Harrier of the first two United States Marine Corps pilots in 1967, which at that time consisted of neither a two-seater version of the aircraft nor a simulator being available, and called heavily on all Farley's experience. He was to continue this association with the USMC, utilising his skill on subsequent developments such as the AV-8B.

==== The Farley Take off ====
Renowned as the foremost display pilot of the Harrier, Farley developed what was to become known as the Farley Take off.

This would see the aircraft put into the hover at around 100 ft (30.5 m), then using the Reaction Controls, raise the nose to around 60 degrees, adjusting the main engine nozzles to suit, so the aircraft was still hovering, but with a high nose up attitude. He would then apply maximum power and "rocket climb" away. There were no gauges or instruments to aid this, it was all by seat of the pants judgement. Royal Air Force and Royal Navy pilots were forbidden from trying it.

=== Retirement and subsequent career ===
Farley retired from test flying with British Aerospace (as he was obliged to) in 1983 on reaching his 50th birthday. He subsequently became Manager of Dunsfold Aerodrome being on hand to offer assistance to the smaller companies involved in the development of aviation. Following the death of Deputy Chief Test Pilot Taylor Scott whilst testing the Harrier GR-5, Farley, a man of high principle and the utmost integrity, took issue with the way in which the matter, particularly concerning Scott's widow, was dealt with by British Aerospace, which in turn led to his leaving the company.

He returned to test flying on a freelance basis. In 1990 Farley became the first westerner to fly the MiG 29. This was at the invitation of a Russian pilot, whom Farley had defended from a reprimand at an air show. During this flight Farley performed the MiG's celebrated “tailslide”. Farley retired from test flying in 1999.

Farley had aeronautical knowledge and was visiting as a lecturer at several universities in addition to which he ran courses to encourage young people to join the aerospace business. As a writer, he was also a regular and enthusiastic contributor to Flyer magazine.

Farley's autobiography A View From The Hover is widely regarded as an aviation classic, and essential reading for anyone aspiring to develop a knowledge of test flying.

== Personal life ==
He met his wife, Patricia Fox-Russell at a dance while posted to RAF Valley on Anglesey. She was the niece of Captain John Fox-Russell, VC. He and Patricia had two daughters. In 1981 he married, Adele Sanford (Pattison) and acquired two stepchildren, Alan Sanford and Claire Sanford. John Farley died on Wednesday, 13 June 2018.
