= 31st Wing =

31st Wing may refer to:

- 31st Wing (Italy)
- 31st Air Wing, Indonesia
- 31st Fighter Wing, United States
