= No. 83 Group Support Unit RAF =

No. 83 Group Support Unit (83 GSU)
- Active: March 1944 – October 1945
- Disbanded: October 1945
- Country: United Kingdom
- Branch: Royal Air Force
- Role: Supply pilots and aircraft for operational squadrons
- Part of: No. 83 Group RAF
- Garrison/HQ: RAF Redhill (March-June 1944)
- Engagements: World War Two
- Battle honours: WW2

Aircraft flown
- Fighter: Supermarine Spitfire, Hawker Typhoon, North American Mustang

No. 83 Group Support Unit RAF was a "holding unit" for aircraft and pilots in WW2, supplying them to operational RAF combat squadrons.

== History ==
No 83 SGU was formed in March 1944 at RAF Redhill, and was there until 25 June 1944 () later moving to RAF Bognor, RAF Thorney Island, RAF Westhampnett and RAF Dunsfold in Surrey.

No 83 GSU maintained a substantial number of combat aircraft of all types, ready to replace losses in combat squadrons in the field. Pilots were often "rotated out" to combat squadrons within a few days of arrival. The instructors were usually pilots who were "resting" between operational tours. 83 GSU also operated "conversion flights" to train pilots on new aircraft types and maintain combat readiness of the existing pool of pilots.

In November 1944 83 GSU arrived at RAF Westhampnett in West Sussex, bringing with it Spitfires, Mustangs and Typhoons.

Flying accidents were not uncommon. On 9 February 1945 Flight Officer John Nesbitt Beattie was flying Typhoon 1B Serial MN704 when the aircraft suffered an engine malfunction leading to a crash in which Beattie was killed. On June 26, 1945, Flight Lieutenant Theos Llewellyn Lewis was flying Typhoon 1B EK432 over Dunsfold, Surrey carrying out a practice rocket attack on the aerodrome when his aircraft crashed and he was killed.

83 GSU RAF was disbanded in October 1945.
