= 31st Air Wing =

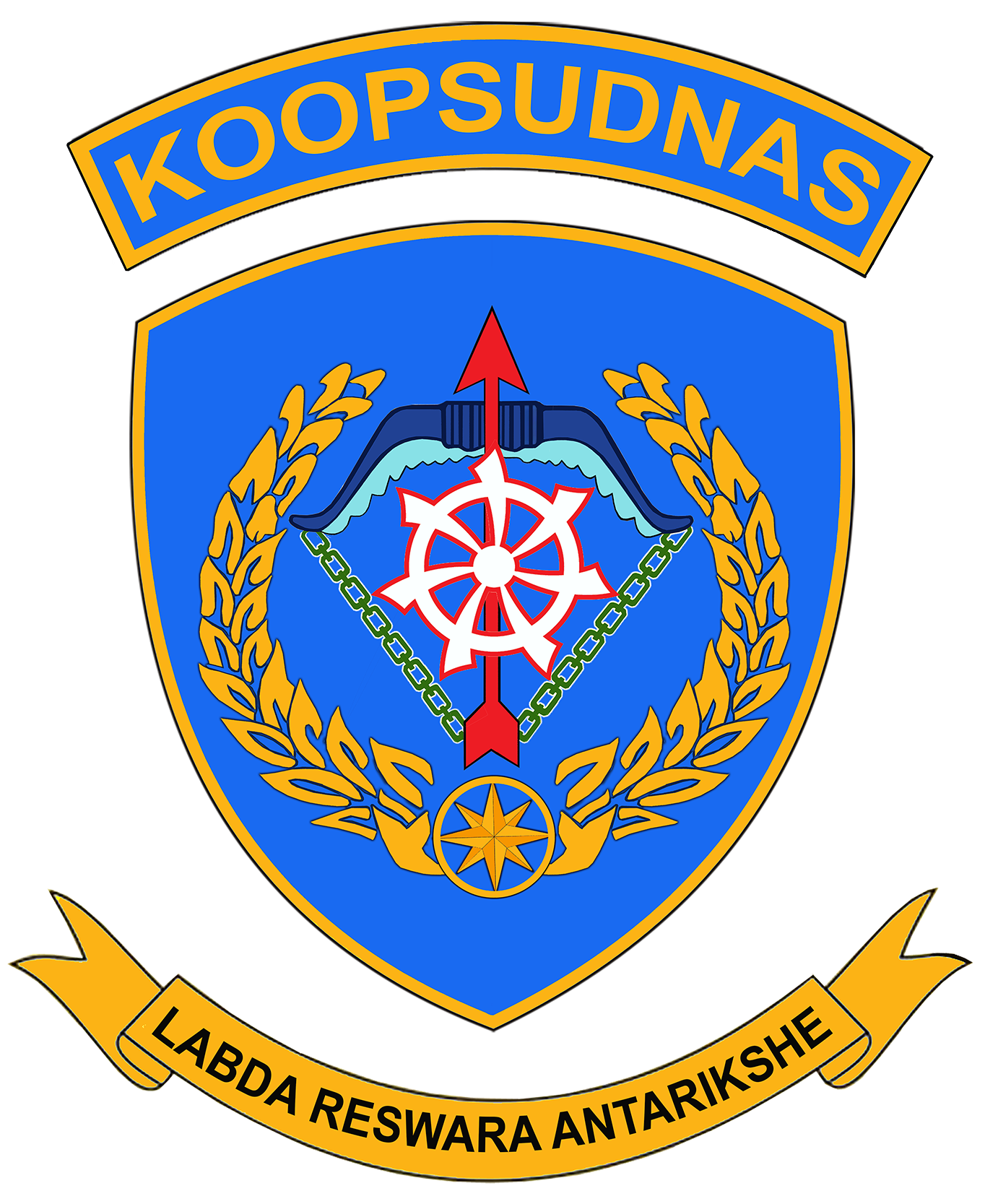
31st Air Wing
- Wing Udara 31
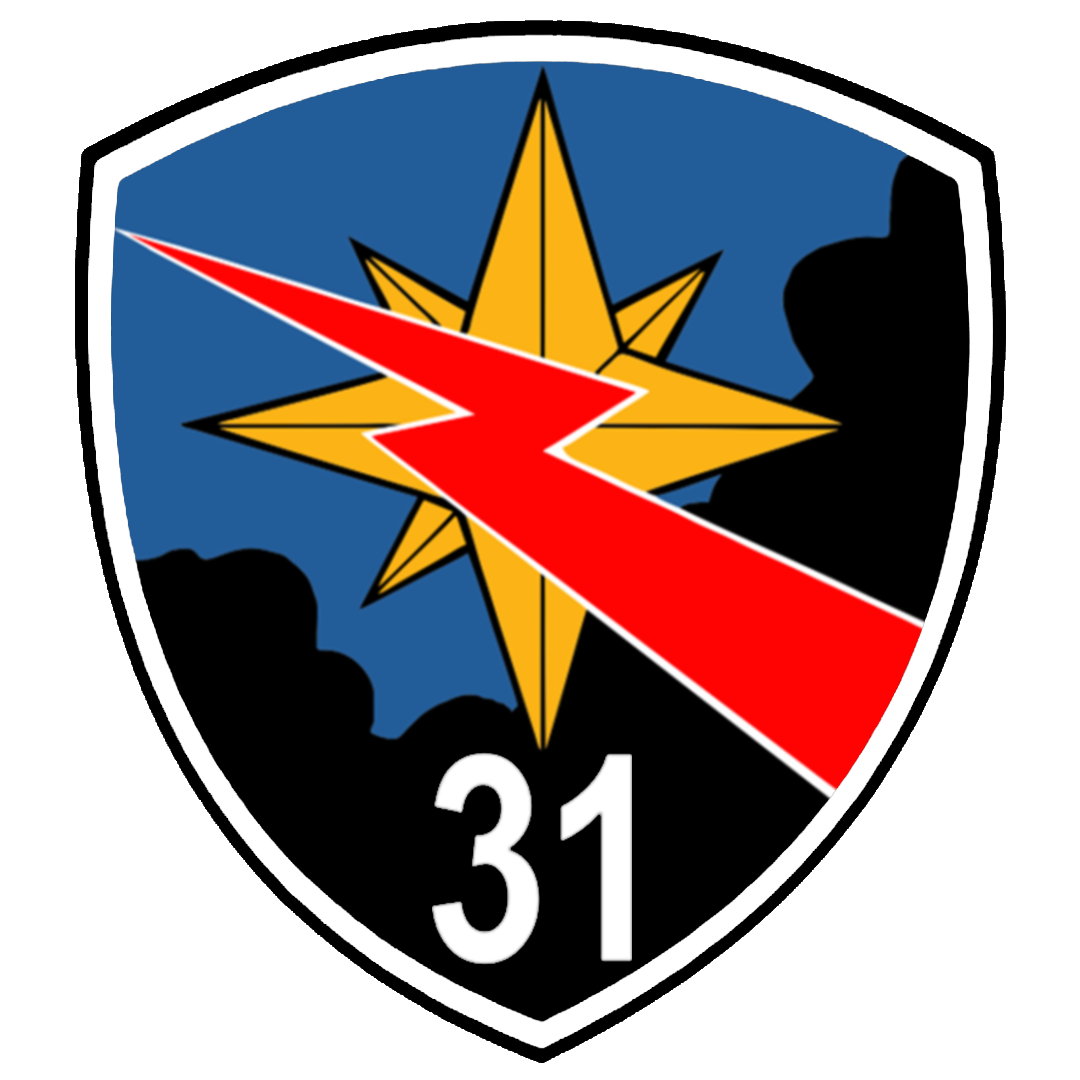
- 31st Air Wing Badge
- Active: 1 September 2016 (as 6th Air Wing); August 2025 (current form)
- Country: Indonesia
- Branch: Indonesian Air Force
- Type: Combat (Tempur)
- Role: Fighter Intercept, Tactical Fighter
- Size: 3 Air Squadrons
- Part of: Air Force Operation Command; 3rd Group (Combat Group)
- Garrison/HQ: Roesmin Nurjadin Air Force Base
- Mottos: Marta Mukti Samata (Sanskrit)
- Website: roesminnurjadin.tni-au.mil.id

Insignia
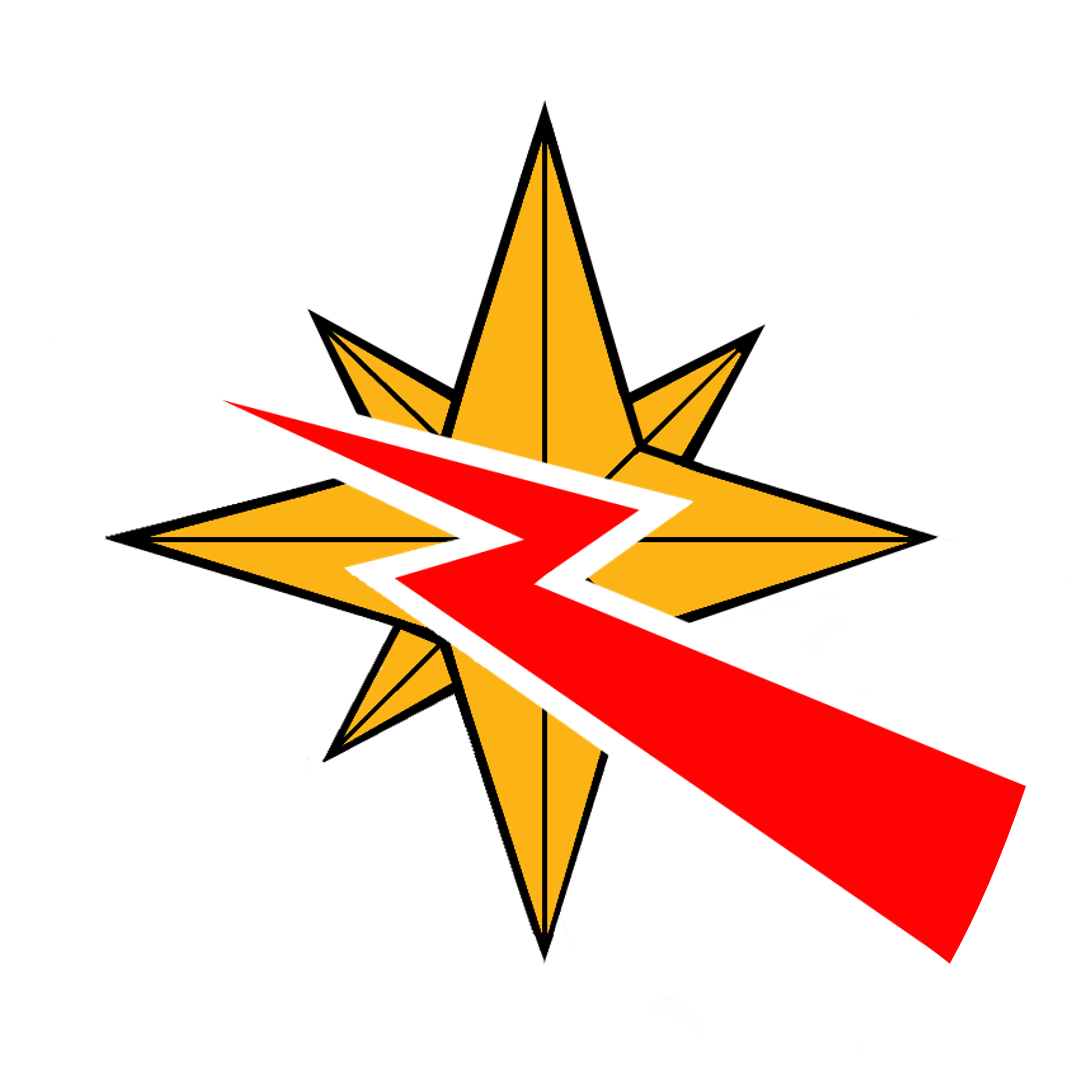
- Tail marking

Aircraft flown
- Attack: BAE Hawk 209 Fighter Attack (Tempur Tembak)
- Fighter: Rafale Fighter (Tempur); F-16 Fighting Falcon Fighter Intercept (Tempur Sergap)
- Trainer: BAE Hawk 109 Fighter Trainer (Tempur Latih)

The 31st Air Wing (Indonesian: Wing Udara 31, sometimes referred to as Wing Udara 3.1) is a unit of the Indonesian Air Force tasked with providing technical assistance in the framework of the operational readiness of the air squadron flight crew at the Roesmin Nurjadin Air Force Base. The 31st Air Wing is under the control of 3rd Group, Air Force Operation Command, based in Pekanbaru, Riau.

The 31st Air Wing has the responsibility to always maintain and improve the operational readiness of the three air squadrons under its command, especially the level of professionalism of the units in their ranks.

== Units ==
- 1st Air Squadron "Elang" (Eagle), equipped with Hawk 109/209
- 12th Air Squadron "Black Panther", equipped with Rafale EI/DI F4.1
- 16th Air Squadron "Rydder", equipped with F-16C/D Block 52ID
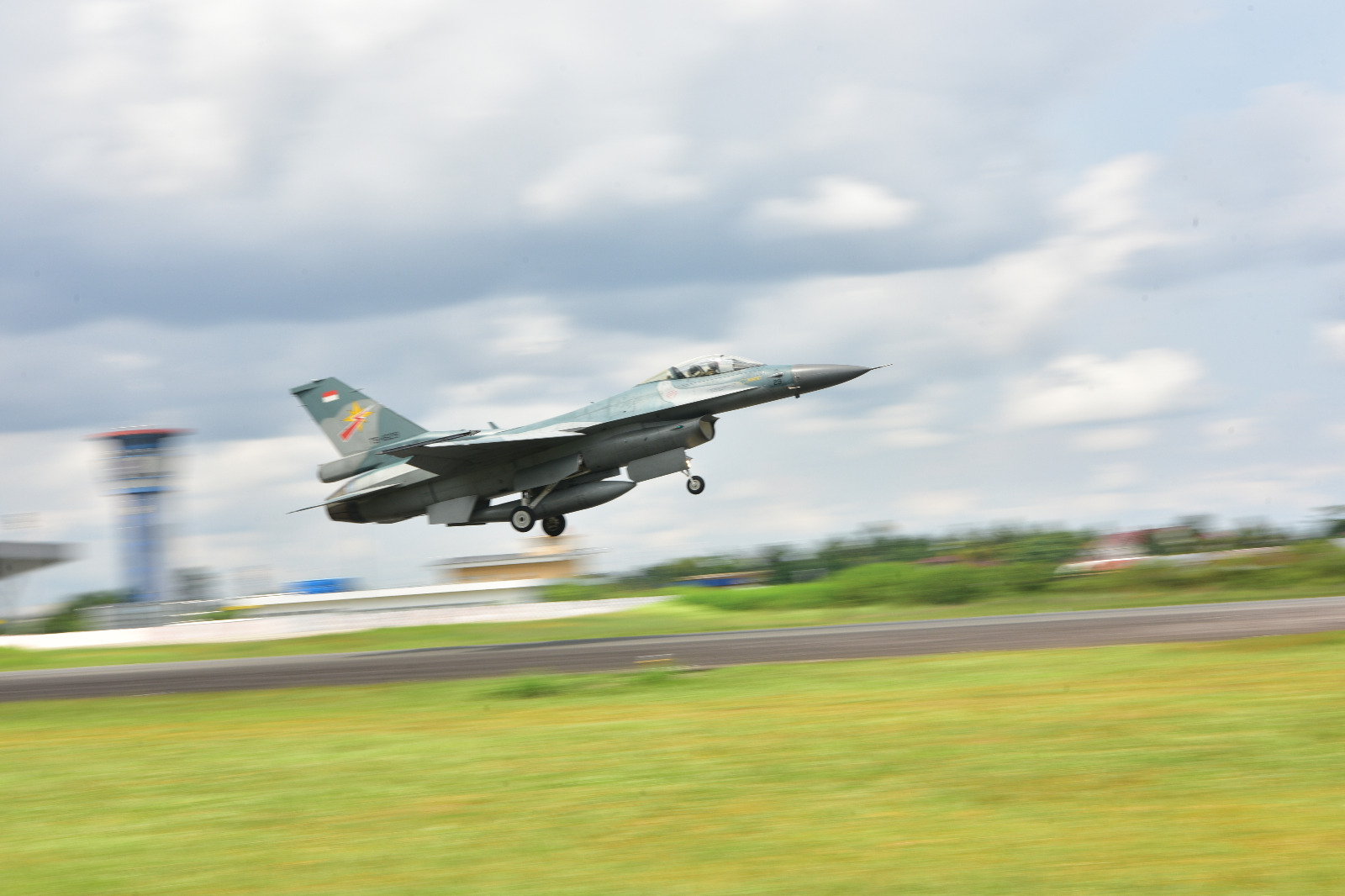
  F-16C from the 16th Air Squadron
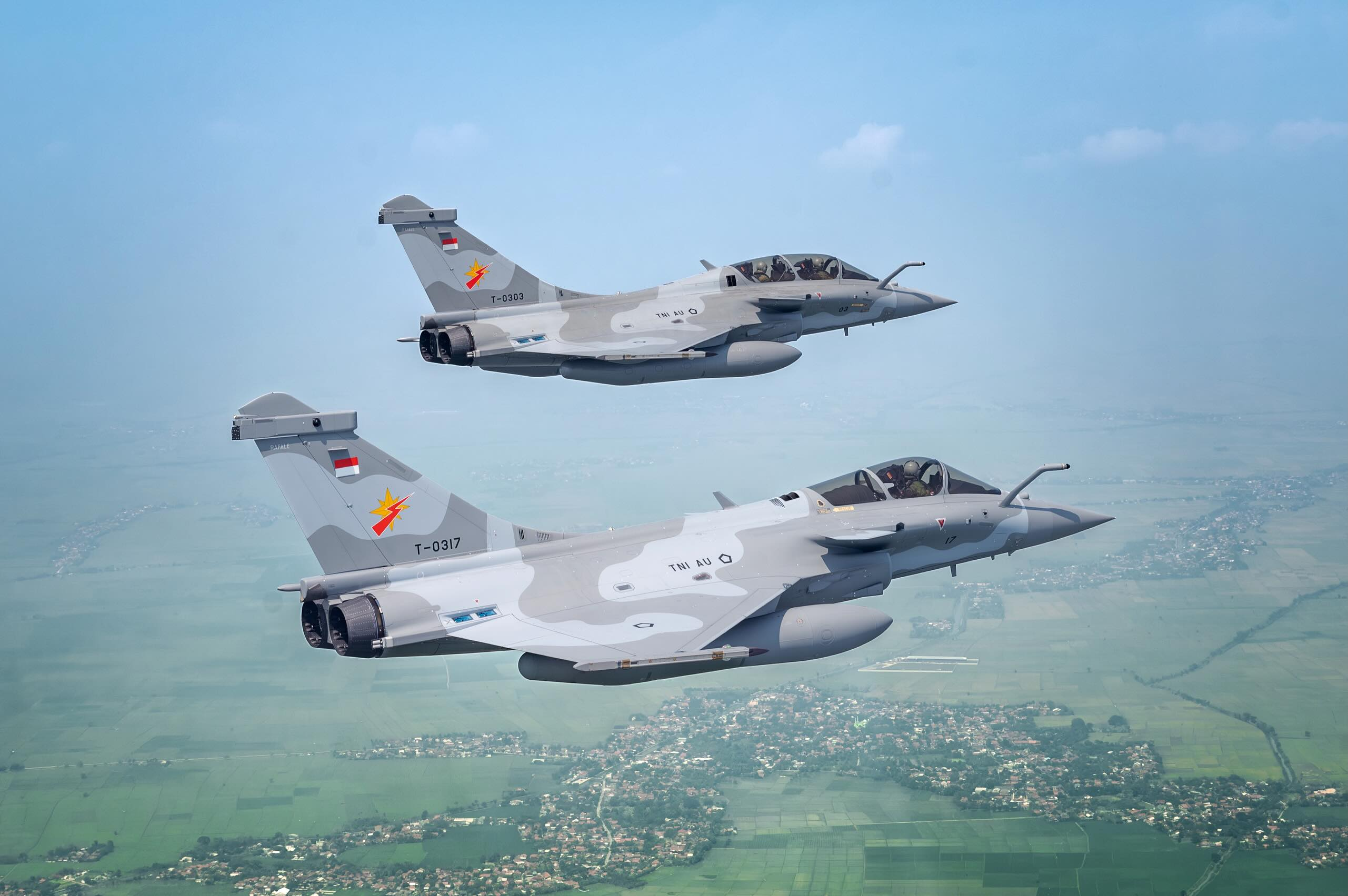
  Rafale EI/DI F4.1 of the 12th Air Squadron
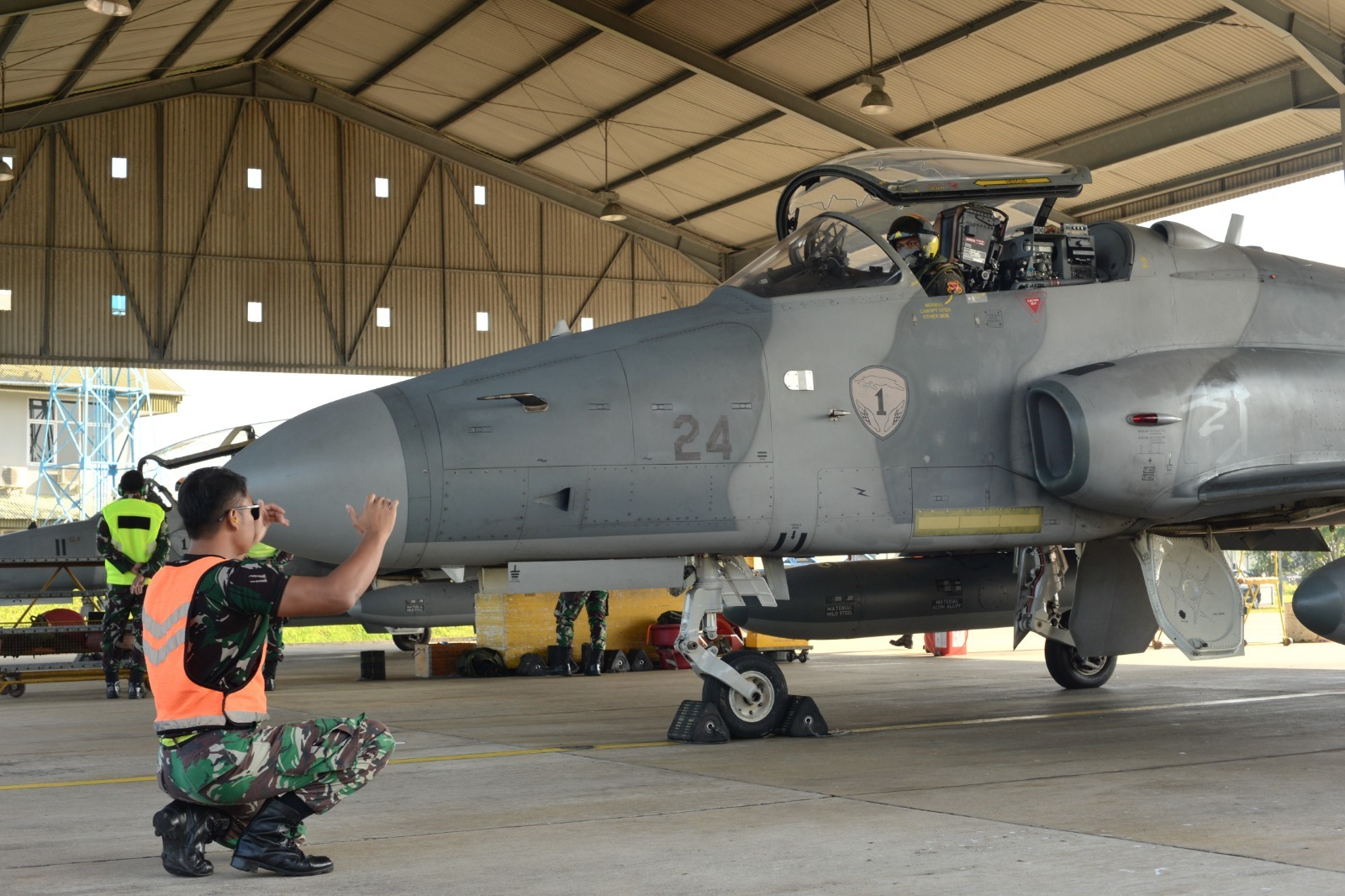
  Hawk 209 of the 1st Air Squadron
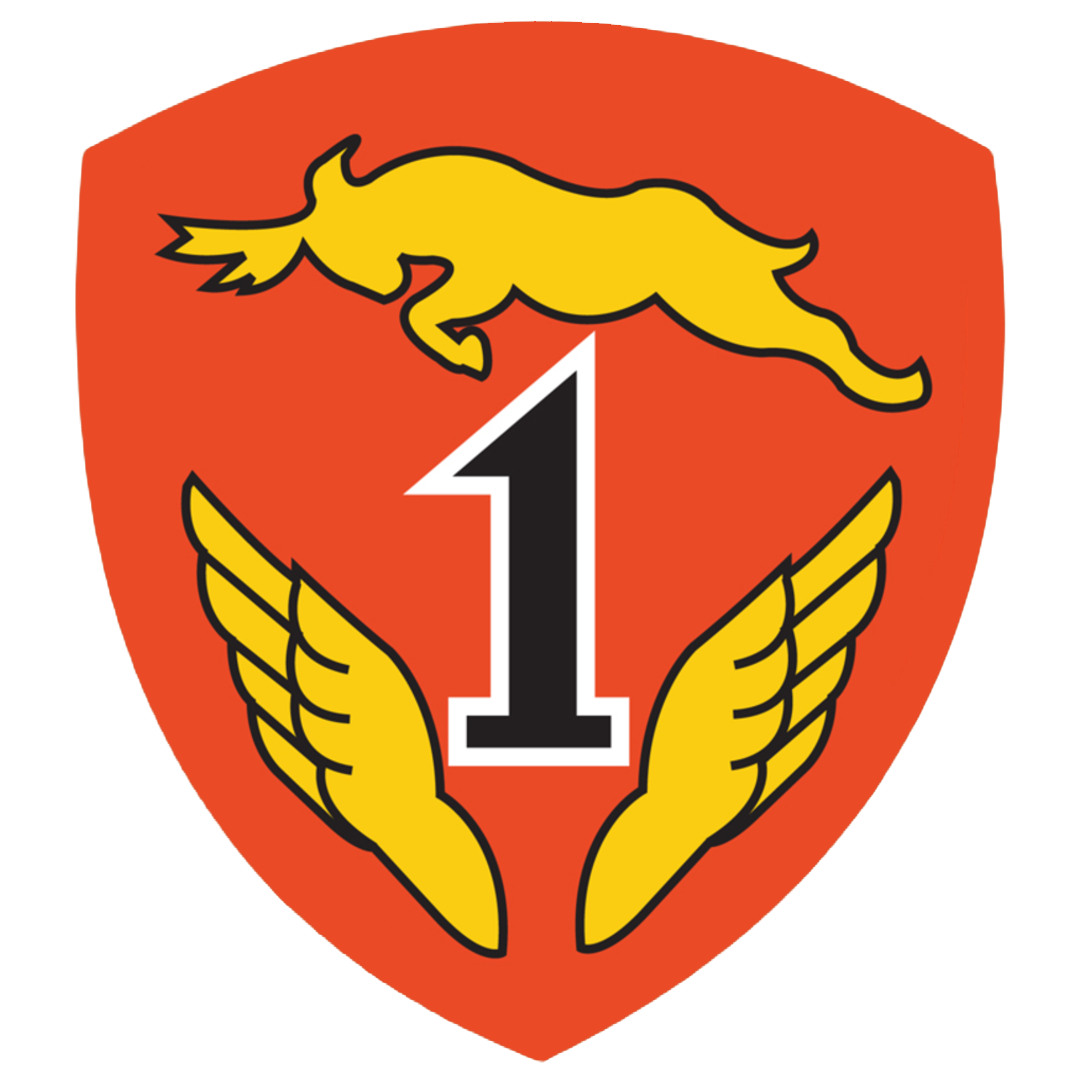
1st Air Squadron

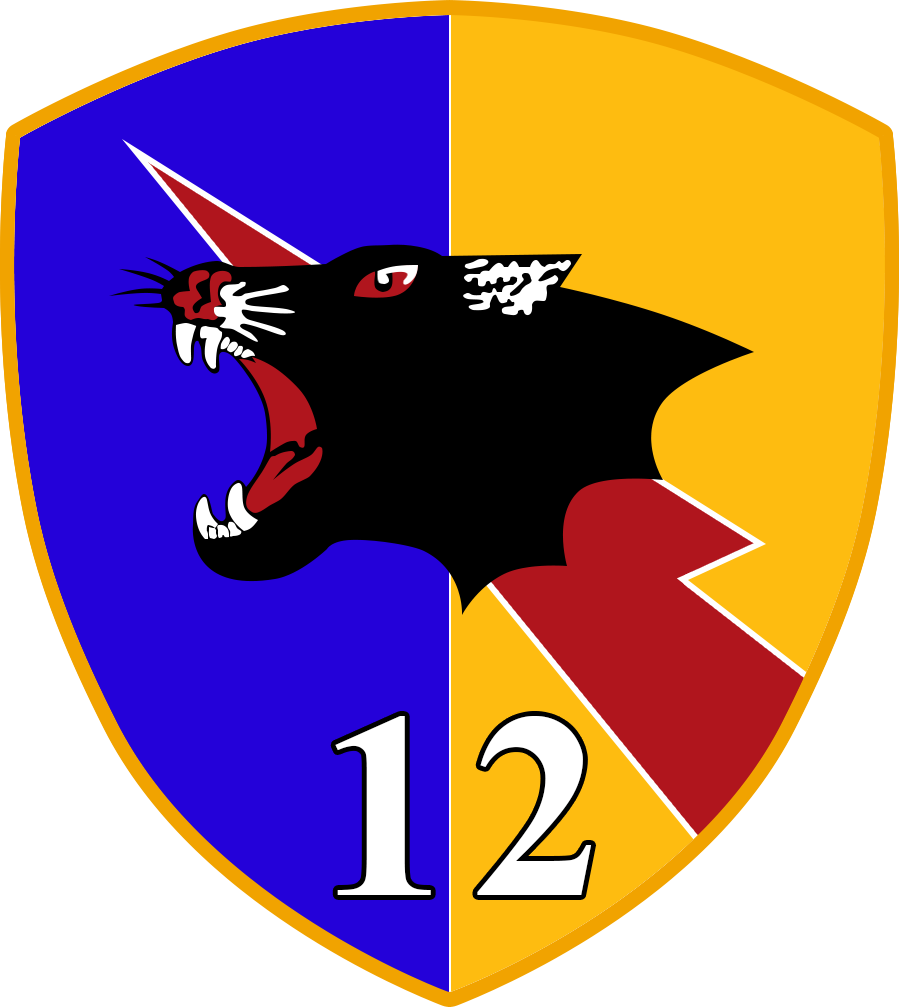
12th Air Squadron

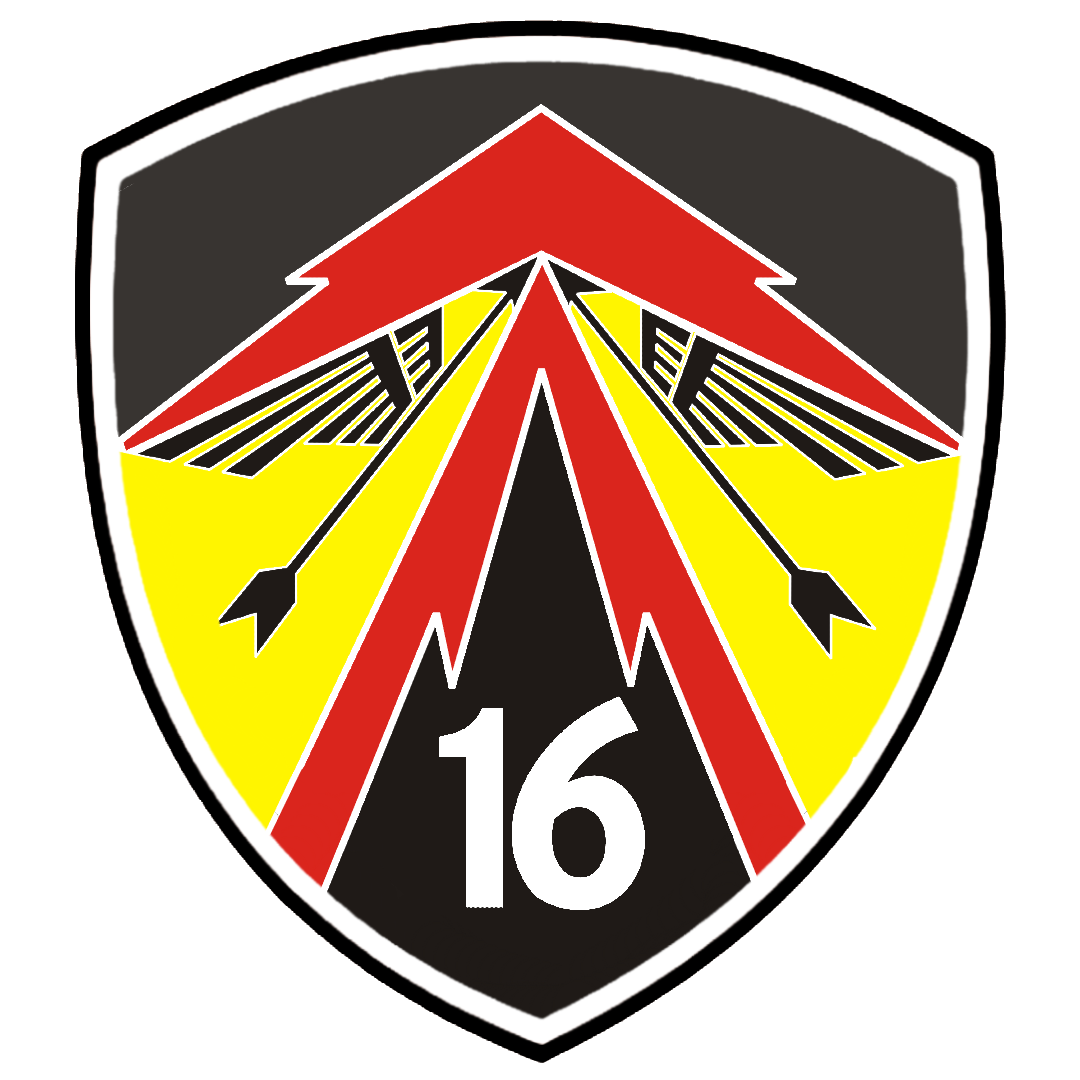
16th Air Squadron

== See also ==
- 32nd Air Wing
- National Air Operations Command
