= Taylor Scott =

British pilot

- Born: 5 December 1946; Newcastle upon Tyne, Northumberland, England
- Died: 22 October 1987 (aged 40) Salisbury Plain, Wiltshire, England
- Allegiance: United Kingdom
- Branch: Royal Navy
- Rank: Lieutenant commander
- Other work: Test pilot

Lieutenant Commander Taylor Humphrey Scott (5 December 1946 – 22 October 1987) was an English Fleet Air Arm pilot and a test pilot for British Aerospace.

== Early life ==
Scott was born in Newcastle in 1946. He joined the Royal Navy in 1964 and after training flew Sea Vixens. This was followed by tour with the US Navy, including the Top Gun course at the Fighter Weapons School at NAS Miramar. Consequently he was posted to HMS Ark Royal in 1974 as an Air Weapons Instructor, flying F-4K Phantoms.

== Navy test pilot ==
During the development of the Sea Harrier, John Farley, (Hawker Siddeley's deputy chief test pilot) asked Fleet Air Arm for "one of your best youngsters off Ark Royal" (Note: At this time HMS Ark Royal was just decommissioning) to be the Project Liaison Officer. As a result, Scott was posted to Dunsfold in 1977. There he quickly impressed John Farley, and was made the leader of the Sea Harrier cockpit development programme. In this programme, the Sea Harrier avionics were flight tested in a modified two seat Hunter.

== Civilian test pilot ==
In 1979 he left the Royal Navy to join British Aerospace (BAe) as a Sea Harrier test pilot. In this role he was responsible for rationalising the Sea Harrier cockpit displays. At the start of the Falklands War Scott was instrumental in clearing the AIM-9L Sidewinder for use from the Sea Harrier. He also volunteered for active service; however, this was refused. Instead he was placed on temporary recall and tasked with helping to re-form and train 809 NAS. He returned to BAe and in 1983 was appointed Sea Harrier Project Test Pilot. In October 1987 Scott was promoted to Deputy Chief Test Pilot.

On 22 October 1987 Scott was carrying out the final pre-delivery test flight of Harrier GR. 5 ZD325, before handover to the Royal Air Force. A malfunction of the Martin-Baker Mk. 12 ejection seat ejected him from the aircraft at 30,000 feet (9,100 m). His parachute was damaged, and he was killed. The explanation put forward by the inquest was that when Scott lowered his seat to reduce glare on the instrument panel, the manual override (MOR) handle had been activated by a loose object under the MOR rocket operating rod. In March 1990 a BAe memorandum relating to the cause of this incident was briefly discussed in the House of Commons by Alan Clark.

== Personal life ==
Scott married Margaret A. Hayes in 1972 and together they had two children.

== Quotations ==
If there was one person that deserves a medal for the way the Sea Harrier was operated in the Falklands .. it's Taylor, because he made sure that what was in that cockpit was what the naval pilots needed to do their job

— John Farley
