= Dunsfold =

Village and parish in Surrey, England

Coordinates: 51.1161°N 0.5638°W

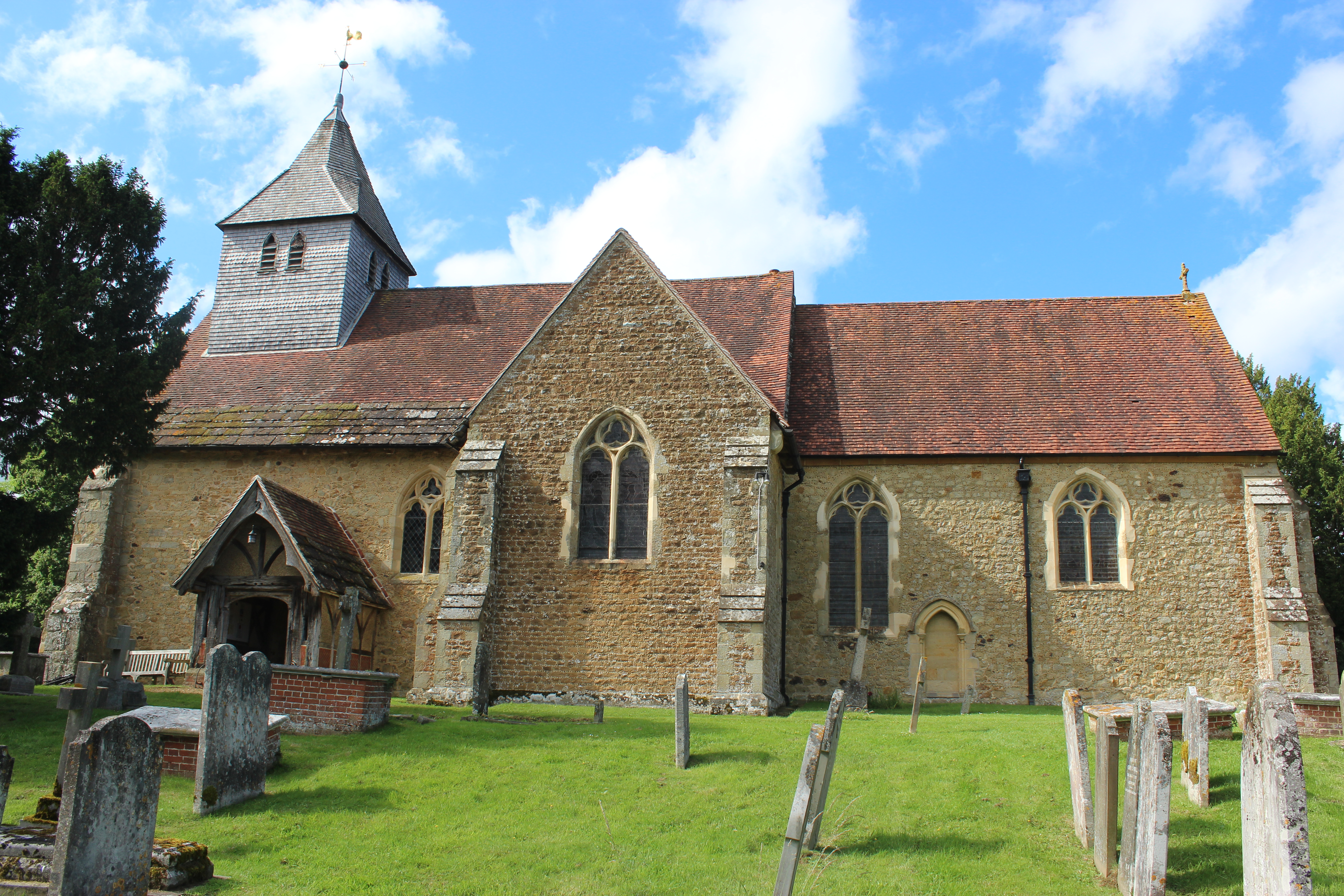
- Church of St. Mary and All Saints

- Location within Surrey
- Area: 16.06 km^{2} (6.20 sq mi)
- Population: 989 (Civil Parish 2011)
  - Density: 62/km^{2} (160/sq mi)
- OS grid reference: TQ006361
- Civil parish: Dunsfold
- District: Waverley
- Shire county: Surrey
- Region: South East
- Country: England
- Sovereign state: United Kingdom
- Post town: Godalming
- Postcode district: GU8
- Dialling code: 01483
- Police: Surrey
- Fire: Surrey
- Ambulance: South East Coast
- UK Parliament: Godalming and Ash

Dunsfold is a village and civil parish in the borough of Waverley, Surrey, England, 8.7 miles (14.0 kilometres) south of Guildford. It lies in the Weald and reaches in the north the southern escarpment of the Greensand Ridge. It includes the Wey and Arun Canal, and just under half of Dunsfold Aerodrome, which is shared with Alfold.

== History ==
=== Norman English (Middle Ages) building and records ===
The village's name was recorded as Duntesfaude in 1259, Duntesfaud in 1272 and Duntesfalde in 1291, apparently meaning Dunt's fold. Alternatively it may be derived from the Old English (and Celtic) dun (hill i.e. down) and fold (enclosure). Either way folding means enclosing with fences, a way of moving sheep around the land to graze off the remains of previously harvested crops. It still emulated in modern sheep farming with and without pens around the village. There are some prize-winning Aberdeen Angus cattle farmed here but the last dairy herd has now closed.

St Mary & All Saints' Church is a Norman building, containing the oldest pews in England. The nearby Holy Well was a site of pilgrimage – its waters were thought to cure diseases of the eye. It would be consistent with the topography of the site that the well be a pre-Christian site and the church itself be constructed on a man-made hill of pre-Christian origin.

=== Manors ===
Three manors were here, all had more cultivated fields, in order of size: Burningfold, Field Place and Graffham Grange.

Burningfold

Anthony Browne, 6th Viscount Montagu (d. 1767) held this largest estate from a purchase from a Mr Tanner in 1751 until 1756 and his son sold it to Edmund Woods jun. in 1790. Owner Charlotte Woods built and endowed the first school, on the Green in 1850.

Field Place

Held by Emery Cranley, it briefly split by moiety title between Quenell and Stoughton sisters (both born Cranley), was reunited by Peter Quenell then sold 1651 (to William Yalden) and 1677 (to William Sadler). In 1850 of James Sadler of Chiddingfold held it, by which time its main economy legacy was Field Place, a small manor house, with "a most delightful collection" of roofs of many of pitches and dispositions.

Graffham Grange

In the early 13th century Walter Giffard, Abbot of Waverley, (1236–51), granted all the rights of the abbey in Graffham to Walter de Graffham for a rent of 16s. a year, rent paid to Markwick, a former possession of Waverley Abbey as late as 1808. Mr. J. C. McAndrew was an owner of what was left of it towards the end of 19th century followed by Mr. F. A. Shepherd.

=== Other buildings and industries ===
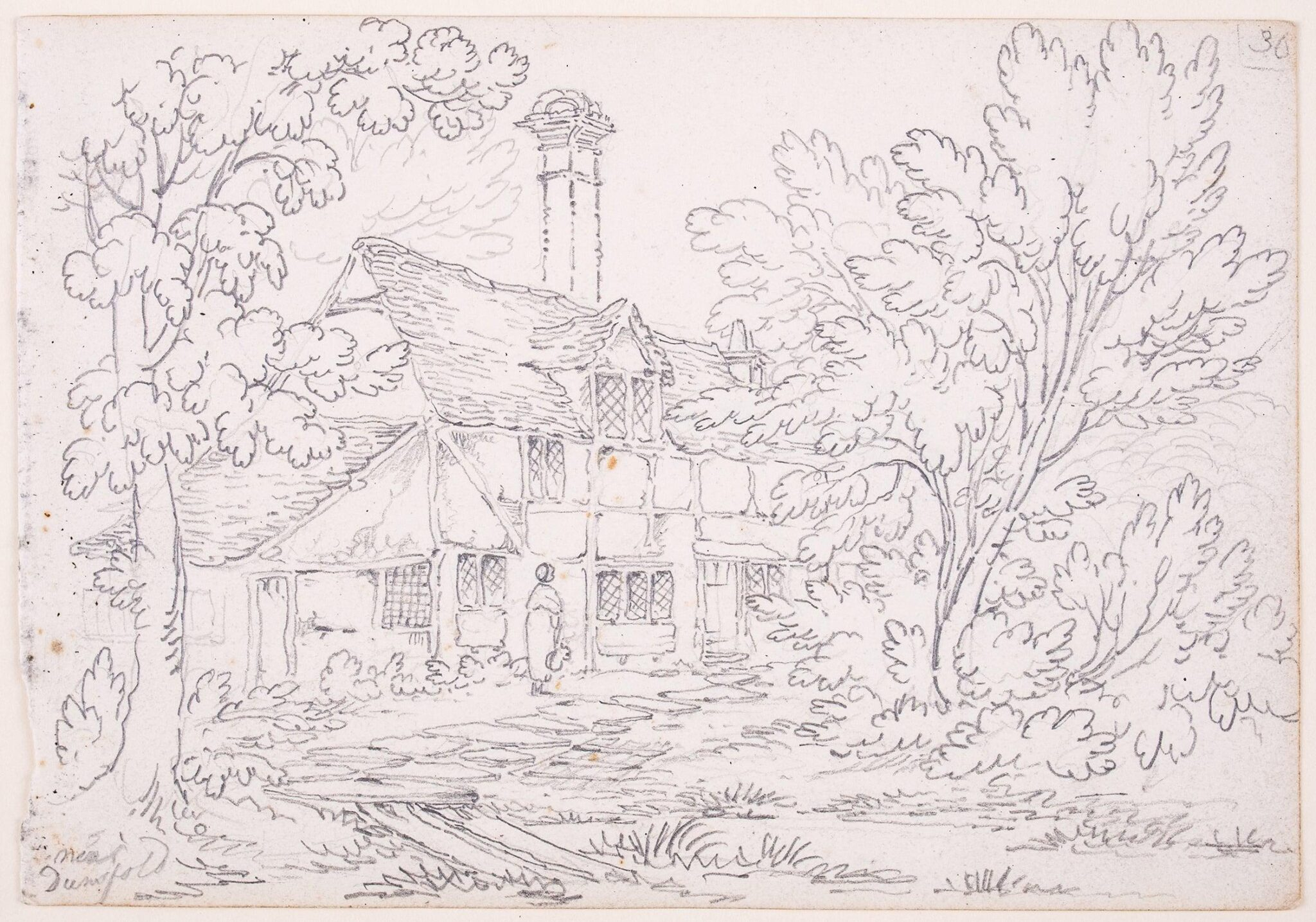
Sketch of Dunsfold by James Bourne, circa 1820

Common House is a late medieval hall which dates from circa 1500, a Grade II listed building. The village has many other houses of architectural interest e.g. Lark's Rise, Yonder Lye and The Sun Inn public house, set back from the common, parts of which are clearly ancient particularly the rear bar.

The village was a site of iron smelting from local ironstone (see Bargate stone) and iron-smithery in the Middle Ages. Later, Dunsfold hosted the construction of the Wey and Arun Canal which is being gradually reopened, and Dunsfold Aerodrome which is used primarily in connection with automobiles of all periods, hosting a major television programme on the subject.

== Amenities ==
The village has a cricket club with matches usually on Sunday afternoons.

Dunsfold has a small Post Office and shop in the middle of the village.

== Dunsfold Park ==
The airstrip was built by the Canadian Army during World War II. After the war it was used to repatriate prisoners of war. Dunsfold was declared inactive in 1946 but was used again in 1948 and 1949 as part of the Berlin Airlift. In 1950 The Hawker Aircraft Company acquired the lease of the site.

In October 1960 the then Hawker Siddeley flight tested its Hawker P. 1127 prototype, the development aircraft that led to the Hawker Siddeley Harrier, the first VTOL jet fighter bomber. Final assembly of the Harrier and the Hawk trainer aircraft was at Dunsfold. Hawker Siddeley became part of British Aerospace in 1977. On 2 July 1986 British Aerospace's deputy chief test pilot Jim Hawkins was killed at Dunsfold when his developmental Hawk 200 crashed. On 24 June 1999 British Aerospace announced the closure of Dunsfold as part of a restructuring; Hawk final assembly had been transferred to Warton in 1988 and Harrier production finished in 1998.

=== Post-British Aerospace ===
In 2002, BAE Systems (British Aerospace's successor) sold Dunsfold Park to The Rutland Group and The Royal Bank of Scotland forming Dunsfold Park Ltd with the intention of developing the site as Britain' s most sustainable village with 2500 homes.

Dunsfold Park was the home to Wings and Wheels, an air and motor show that ran from 2005 until 2019, when it closed. Since 2002, the BBC motoring show Top Gear has been recorded at the park using the former paint shop as a studio and parts of the runways and taxiways of the aerodrome as a test track.

=== The Young Drivers Track ===
Some of the track (The Young Drivers Track) is now used by many driving schools and instructors to enable under seventeen-year-olds to learn to drive.

== Demography and housing ==
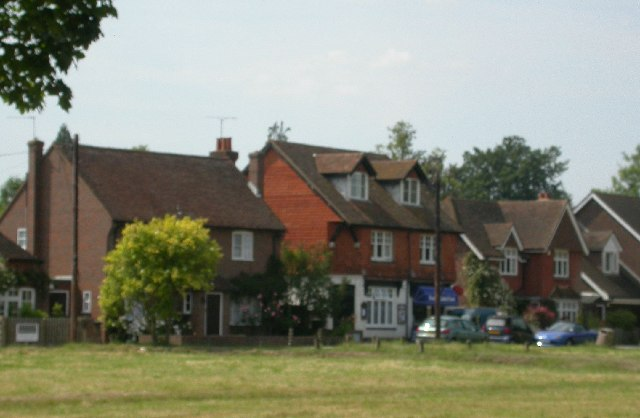
Central housing and shop

2011 Census Homes
Output area	Detached	Semi-detached	Terraced	Flats and apartments	Caravans/temporary/mobile homes	shared between households
(Civil Parish)	214	150	38	38	1	0

The average level of accommodation in the region composed of detached houses was 28%, the average that was apartments was 22.6%.

2011 Census Key Statistics
Output area	Population	Households	% Owned outright	% Owned with a loan	hectares
(Civil Parish)	989	441	38.5%	31.5%	1,606

The proportion of households in the civil parish who owned their home outright compares to the regional average of 35.1%. The proportion who owned their home with a loan compares to the regional average of 32.5%. The remaining % is made up of rented dwellings (plus a negligible % of households living rent-free).

=== Garden village expansion plan ===
In 2006, the owners of Dunsfold Park proposed the construction of a new town with 2,600 homes on the site, a school, health services, public transport and road links to the A281, and an expanded business district. One of the largest construction projects in Surrey, it would result in the closure and replacement of the aerodrome. The project resulted in the formation of the STOP Dunsfold Park New Town campaign.

In late 2007, Dunsfold Park Ltd. applied to have their plans for the new town selected as one of the Brown Ministry's proposed "eco-towns". On 3 April 2008 Dunsfold Park was denied Eco-town status by Housing Minister, Caroline Flint. According to the Government's press release over 40 applications including Dunsfold Park were rejected "for being undeliverable or not ambitious enough to meet the high environmental and affordability standards set by Government."

An appeal in 2009 was rejected by the then Secretary of State John Denham. His conclusions included remarks on the sustainability of the site that "The Secretary of State has concluded that the development would generate a considerable amount of additional road traffic and he considers that this would have a severe and unacceptable impact on an overstretched local road network, and that the scheme would be unsustainable in transport terms."

In March 2018, the Secretary of State granted planning permission for 1,800 homes and a school on the site, the first phase in a plan to provide around 2,600 new homes.

== Notable residents ==
- Peter Curry, barrister and athlete
- Reynold Higgins, classical archaeologist
- John King, Baron King of Wartnaby, businessman and Conservative peer
- Albert Nelson, 6th Earl Nelson, hereditary peer
- Richard Nugent, Baron Nugent of Guildford, Conservative politician
- Joseph Warton, academic and literary critic
