= Dunsfold Aerodrome =

Unlicensed airfield in Surrey, England

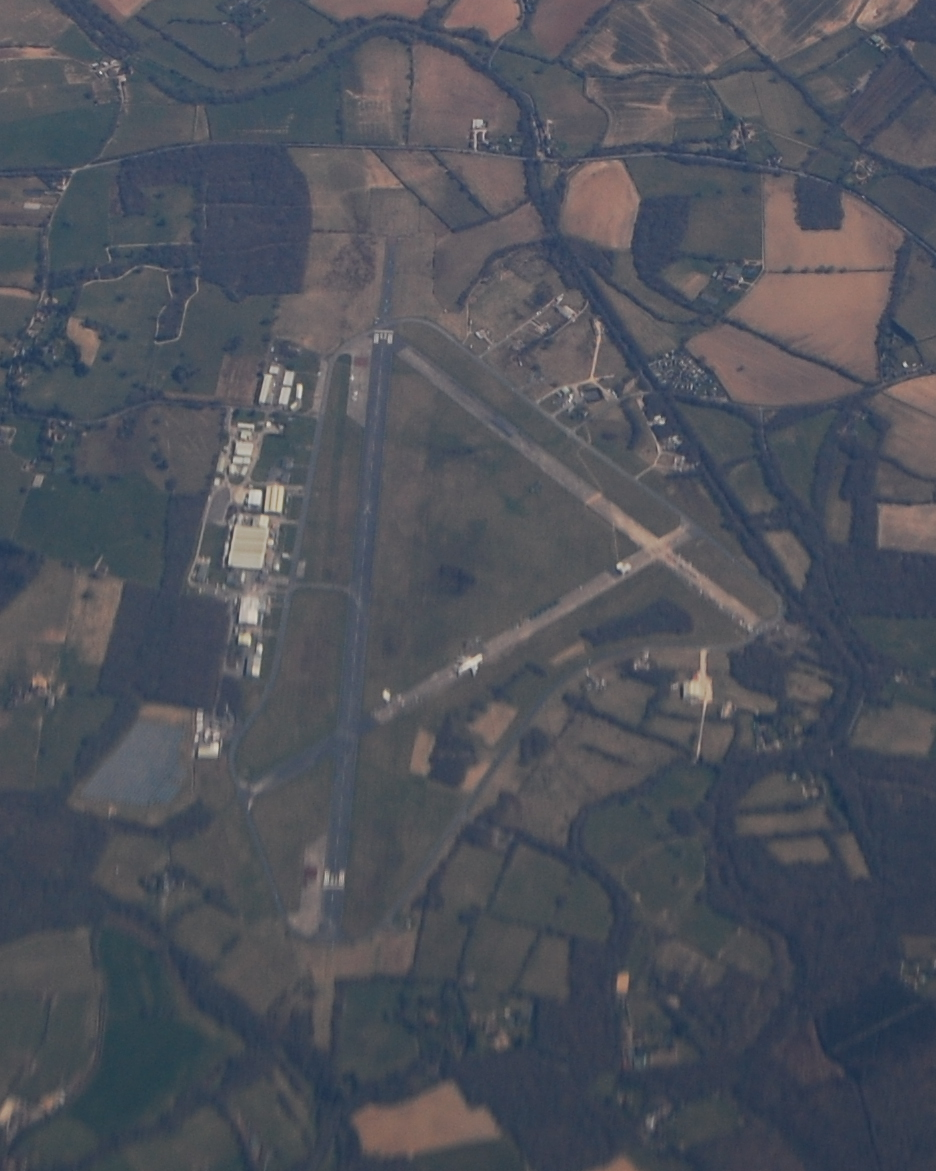
- Dunsfold Aerodrome from the air, in April 2013
- IATA: none; ICAO: EGTD

Summary
- Location: Dunsfold
- Elevation AMSL: 170 ft (52 m)
- Coordinates: 51°06′54″N 000°31′57″W

Map
- Location in Surrey

Runways
Direction	Length		Surface
Direction	ft	m	Surface
07/25	5,496	1,675	Concrete
15/33 (Closed)	0	0	Concrete
02/20 (Closed)	0	0	Concrete

Dunsfold Aerodrome (former ICAO code EGTD) is an unlicensed airfield in Surrey, England, near the village of Cranleigh. It extends across land in the villages of Dunsfold and Alfold.

It was built by the Canadian Army and civilian contractors as a Class A bomber airfield for Army Co-operation Command. It was commanded by the Royal Canadian Air Force from 1942 to 1944 and was known as Royal Canadian Air Force Station Dunsfold. Under RAF control it was RAF Dunsfold.

Post-war it was used by Hawker Siddeley and then its successor British Aerospace. From 2002 to 2020, it was used as the main site of the BBC show Top Gear.

In December 2016, planning permission was granted for 1,800 homes to be built on the site, with the track and associated aerodrome infrastructure, such as the runway drag strip, being demolished.

== History ==
=== Construction and military use ===
Dunsfold Aerodrome was constructed in 1942 by the 2nd Battalion, Royal Canadian Engineers, supported by personnel from the Canadian Forestry Corps. The airfield site covered around 200 acres of woodland which had to be cleared before construction could begin. The Canadian sappers, drawing on equipment provided under the Lend-Lease programme, used heavy earth-moving machinery from North America and employed methods such as pipe-pushing charges to place explosives beneath tree roots, allowing for rapid clearance.

Construction was completed in just over six months, considerably faster than comparable wartime airfield projects which often took up to a year. The completed airfield had three concrete runways arranged in the standard triangular pattern, perimeter tracks and dispersal areas, along with temporary hangars and accommodation huts.

The first units based at Dunsfold were No. 400 Squadron RCAF (from 4 December 1942), No. 414 Squadron RCAF (from 5 December 1942) and No. 430 Squadron RCAF (from 8 January 1943), flying Curtiss Tomahawk and North American Mustang I aircraft on tactical reconnaissance missions.

In late 1943 Dunsfold was transferred to No. 139 Wing RAF, operating Mitchell II medium bombers. The wing was formed from No. 139 Airfield Headquarters RAF and included No. 98 Squadron, No. 180 Squadron and No. 320 (Netherlands) Squadron RAF, the latter manned by personnel from the Netherlands Naval Aviation Service. The wing conducted raids on targets in occupied Europe until October 1944, when it moved to the continent to support the advancing Allied forces.

Following the wing's departure, Dunsfold became home to No. 83 Group Support Unit RAF, which serviced and tested Spitfires, Typhoons and Tempests prior to operational deployment. In February 1945 the unit was redesignated the 83 Group Disbandment Centre, and later assisted with the repatriation of Allied prisoners of war in the closing months of the war.

The aerodrome was declared inactive by the Royal Air Force in 1946 and subsequently leased to Skyways Ltd. for civilian use. Skyways operated and maintained aircraft including the Avro York, Avro Lancastrian, Douglas C-54 Skymaster, de Havilland Dragon Rapide and de Havilland Dove, and played a role in supporting the Berlin Airlift. The company also refurbished surplus RAF Spitfires and Hurricanes for the Portuguese Air Force.

The following units were based at Dunsfold at various times:

- Detachment from No. 21 Squadron RAF (Mosquito VI), 17 April–18 June 1944
- No. 128 Airfield Headquarters RAF, 4–28 July 1943 (231 and 400 Squadrons)
- No. 231 Squadron RAF, 6–11 July and 21–28 July 1943 (Mustang I)
- No. 276 Squadron RAF, 10–14 November 1945 (Supermarine Walrus)
- No. 400 Squadron RCAF
- No. 414 Squadron RCAF
- No. 430 Squadron RCAF
- No. 98 Squadron RAF
- No. 180 Squadron RAF
- No. 320 (Netherlands) Squadron RAF
- No. 402 Air Stores Park
- No. 415 Air Stores Park
- No. 2791 Squadron RAF Regiment
- No. 2826 Squadron RAF Regiment
- No. 2879 Squadron RAF Regiment

=== Post-war use ===
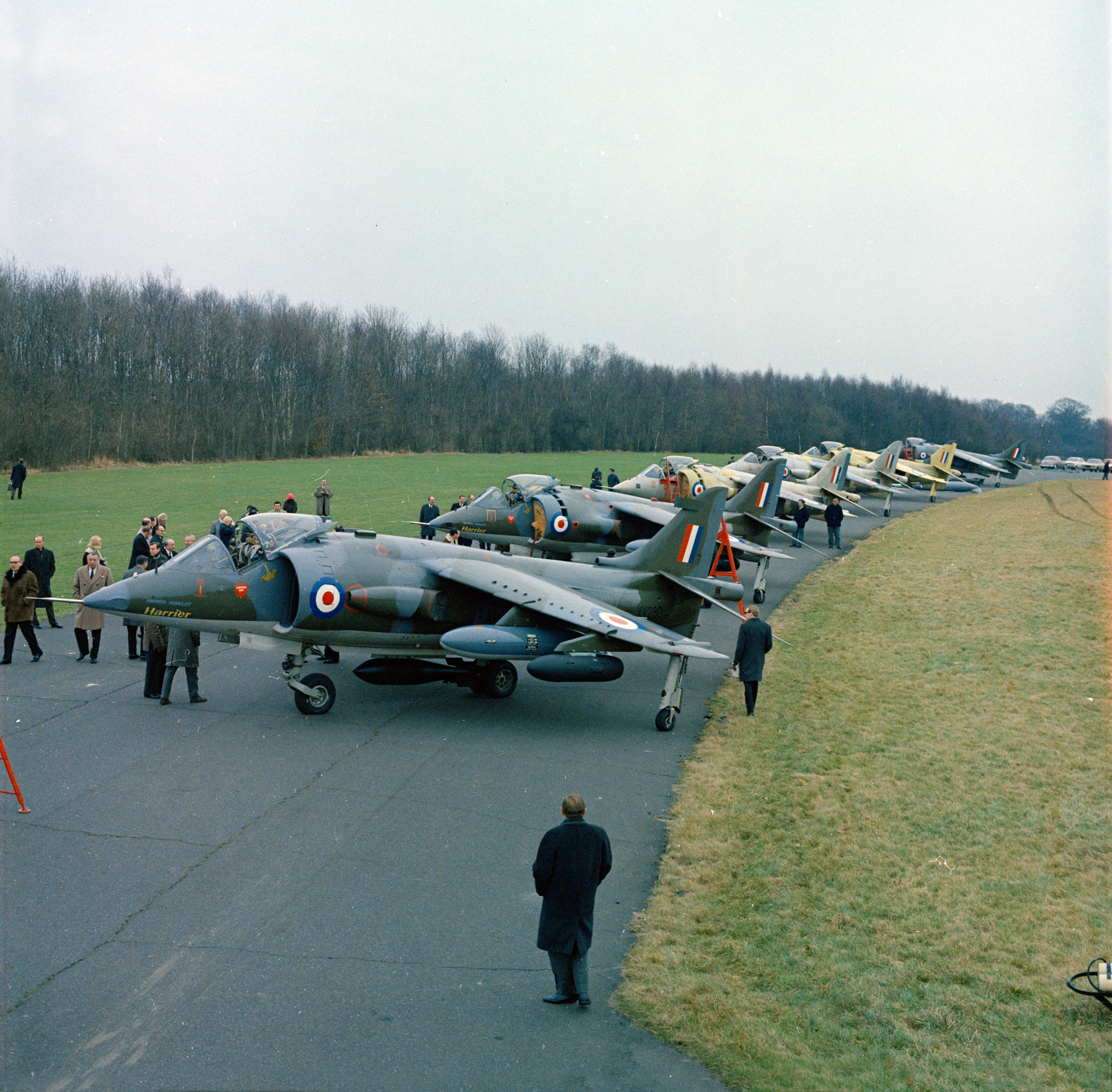
Six pre-production Hawker Siddeley Harrier GR.1s at Dunsfold Aerodrome, 1968.

In 1950, the Hawker Aircraft Company acquired the lease of Dunsfold Aerodrome from the Air Ministry. The airfield subsequently became a major site for jet aircraft development, maintenance and testing. During the 1950s it gained international prominence through the development and production of the Hawker Hunter fighter, while limited numbers of Sea Hawks were also completed and existing Sea Furies refurbished for naval use.

Between 1953 and 1958, Airwork Ltd leased two hangars at the site to overhaul and refurbish North American F-86 Sabre and Supermarine Attacker aircraft for the Royal Navy and export customers.

In October 1960, the newly formed Hawker Siddeley Group conducted the first flight of the experimental Hawker P.1127 at Dunsfold. The P.1127 pioneered vertical take-off and landing (VTOL) technology and directly led to the development of the Hawker Siddeley Harrier, the world's first operational VTOL jet fighter-bomber. Dunsfold remained central to Harrier testing and development throughout the 1960s and 1970s.

In 1961, production and test flying of the Folland Gnat were transferred from Chilbolton, Hampshire, to Dunsfold, which also became the final assembly and flight test centre for both the Harrier and later the Hawk advanced trainer aircraft.

Following a series of mergers, Hawker Siddeley became part of British Aerospace (BAe) in 1977. The site continued to serve as BAe's flight test facility for the BAe Hawk and BAe Harrier families. On 2 July 1986, BAe deputy chief test pilot Jim Hawkins was killed during a test flight when the prototype Hawk 200 crashed near the airfield.

On 24 June 1999, British Aerospace announced the phased closure of Dunsfold as part of a corporate restructuring programme. Hawk final assembly had already been transferred to Warton in 1988, while Sea Harrier production ended in 1998 and Harrier II production was moved to Brough in 2000.

Following closure, the gate guardian aircraft – Hawker P.1127 XP984 – was relocated on long-term loan to the Brooklands Museum in Weybridge, where it remains on display.

=== 21st century ===
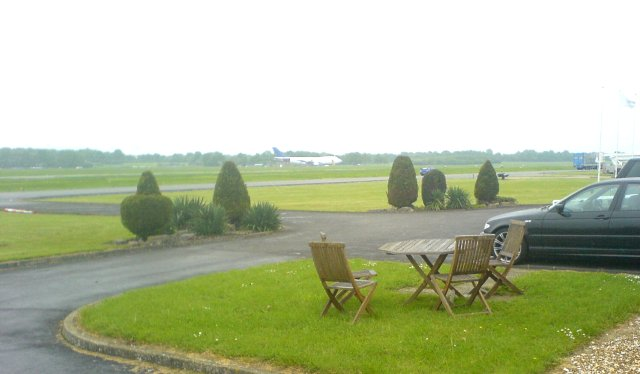
View across the aerodrome

In 2002, BAE Systems (successor to British Aerospace) sold Dunsfold Aerodrome to The Rutland Group, which subsequently established Dunsfold Park Ltd. From mid-2002 until 2020, the BBC motoring programme Top Gear was filmed at the site, using a hangar as its studio and sections of the airfield's runways and taxiways as the test track.

The test track also hosts cycling races during the summer as part of the Surrey Cycle Racing League's closed-circuit series.

From 2005 to 2019, Dunsfold Park hosted the annual air and motor show Wings and Wheels, typically held in late August. The event attracted over 25,000 visitors annually and raised substantial funds for charities, including Help for Heroes and the Surrey & Sussex Air Ambulance.

Dunsfold Park Ltd has also operated entertainment events such as the Dunsfold Drive-In cinema, and the classical concert series Strings & Wings.

In October 2020, a second Boeing 747-400 (registration G-CIVW) arrived at Dunsfold to join G-BDXJ for use as a filming location and for training purposes. The aircraft, formerly operated by British Airways, was flown in from Cardiff Airport. A third aircraft, G-BNLY—one of the three Retrojet 747s painted in the 1980s–1990s Landor Associates livery and named City of Swansea—arrived in December 2020.

==== Aviation use controversy ====
The aerodrome's lawful use as an aviation site has long been the subject of dispute. Operations have been governed by a series of temporary planning consents restricting flight movements and limiting operating hours. In April 2011, Dunsfold Park Ltd claimed that aviation use was unrestricted, arguing that it either predated modern planning controls or was protected by a 1951 consent permitting "erection, repair and flight testing of aircraft". The claim was opposed by local parish councils, environmental groups such as the Campaign to Protect Rural England and Friends of the Earth, and several MPs.

In June 2011, Waverley Borough Council refused the company's application for a certificate of lawful use, and a subsequent appeal was dismissed in April 2012. The planning inspector ruled that the 1951 consent did not equate to unrestricted flying rights and reaffirmed this in a 2014 High Court judgment by Lord Justice Sullivan.

==== Housing development ====
In 2006, Dunsfold Park Ltd proposed a new settlement comprising approximately 2,600 homes, a school, healthcare facilities, and transport links to the A281. The scheme was intended as a model of green and sustainable living.

The proposal was considered under the UK Government's 2007–08 eco-town initiative but rejected for being below the minimum required 5,000 dwellings and for insufficient public transport provision. Despite opposition from local councils and residents, the plan received support from environmental groups such as Friends of the Earth and academics including Professor Roland Clift, who cited its potential as a sustainable redevelopment alternative to expanded aviation use.

The scheme was refused by Waverley Borough Council and rejected on appeal in 2009 by then Secretary of State John Denham. In 2013, The Rutland Group sold the site to Trinity College, Cambridge, forming a development partnership to pursue revised plans.

In December 2016, planning permission was granted for 1,800 homes on the site. Redevelopment plans include the eventual demolition of the test track and remaining aerodrome infrastructure.

== Memorial ==
A memorial, funded by public subscription, was erected outside the nearby Alfold Barn pub (on the A281 road between Guildford and Horsham). The memorial and its unveiling on 20 July 1992, exactly 50 years to the day after the first aircraft (an RCAF Tiger Moth) landed at Dunsfold, was organised by the Dunsfold Society. A Tiger Moth and Lockheed P-3 Orion (of present-day 320 Sqn RDNAS) performed fly-pasts.

== Museum ==
A museum housing a collection of Second World War Dunsfold memorabilia is maintained on site (open on Wednesdays to the public) by volunteers; the museum was started by the late Reg Day who served with 98 Sqn RAF at Dunsfold in 1943–44.

== Incidents and accidents ==
- On 7 January 1944, two RAF bombers collided near Dunsfold and crashed.
- On 20 November 1975, a Hawker Siddeley HS.125 G-BCUX was taking off on a test flight from runway 07. Just as aircraft became airborne, it had a birdstrike. The pilots tried to land back on the airfield but the aircraft overran the runway and struck a passing car on the A281 road. The aircraft stopped in a field and was destroyed by fire. All six people inside the car died, and one crew member out of nine passengers and crew was injured.
- On 2 July 1986, British Aerospace's deputy chief test pilot Jim Hawkins was killed at Dunsfold when the prototype Hawk 200 ZG200 crashed into farmland just beyond the road outside the airfield's southern boundary.
- On Thursday 22 October 1987, Harrier GR5 'ZD325' flew pilotless 800 miles over South West England into the Atlantic Ocean at around 7pm. The Harrier had taken off from Dunsfold at 4.59pm, with pilot Taylor Scott, who was found at 6pm on 23 October 1987, near Winterbourne Stoke in Wiltshire. The aircraft last made contact with ATC over Wiltshire, at 5.06pm. There was a mystery, as the ejection seat was thought to be still with the aircraft. The Harrier was followed by a USAF Lockheed C-5 Galaxy for one and half hours, piloted by Captain Jerry Brunt.
- On 5 June 1998, a Hawker Hunter (G-HHUN) crashed at Dunsfold prior to that weekend's airshow. The pilot, John Davies, was killed.

== Appearances in media ==
A former Boeing 747-200 of British Airways (registration G-BDXJ, named City of Birmingham) was acquired by Aces High Limited, a company specialising in supplying aircraft for television and film work, and transferred to Dunsfold. It was modified and used for filming for the 2006 James Bond film Casino Royale, with several scenes set at Miami International Airport filmed at Dunsfold.

The airfield has since become a popular filming location for both film and television productions, taking advantage of its large runway, hangars and adaptable facilities.

=== Film ===
Notable films partly shot at Dunsfold Aerodrome include:

- Batman Begins (2005)
- The Da Vinci Code (2006)
- Casino Royale (2006)
- Last Chance Harvey (2008)
- Nanny McPhee and the Big Bang (2010)
- World War Z (2013)
- Red 2 (2013)
- The Theory of Everything (2014)
- London Has Fallen (2016)
- War Machine (2017)
- Bohemian Rhapsody (2018)
- The Batman (2022)
- Golda (2023)

=== Television ===
Television series filmed in whole or in part at Dunsfold include:

- Top Gear (BBC) – the airfield served as the programme's test track and studio base for 18 years.
- Fifth Gear (2006) – featured a segment where a Volkswagen Touareg towed the Boeing 747 across the runway.
- Primeval (ITV)
- Spooks (BBC)
- Come Fly with Me (BBC) – filmed on the Boeing 747 set at the airfield.
- The Day of the Triffids (BBC, 2009)
