= 12th Air Squadron =

- Skadron Udara 12
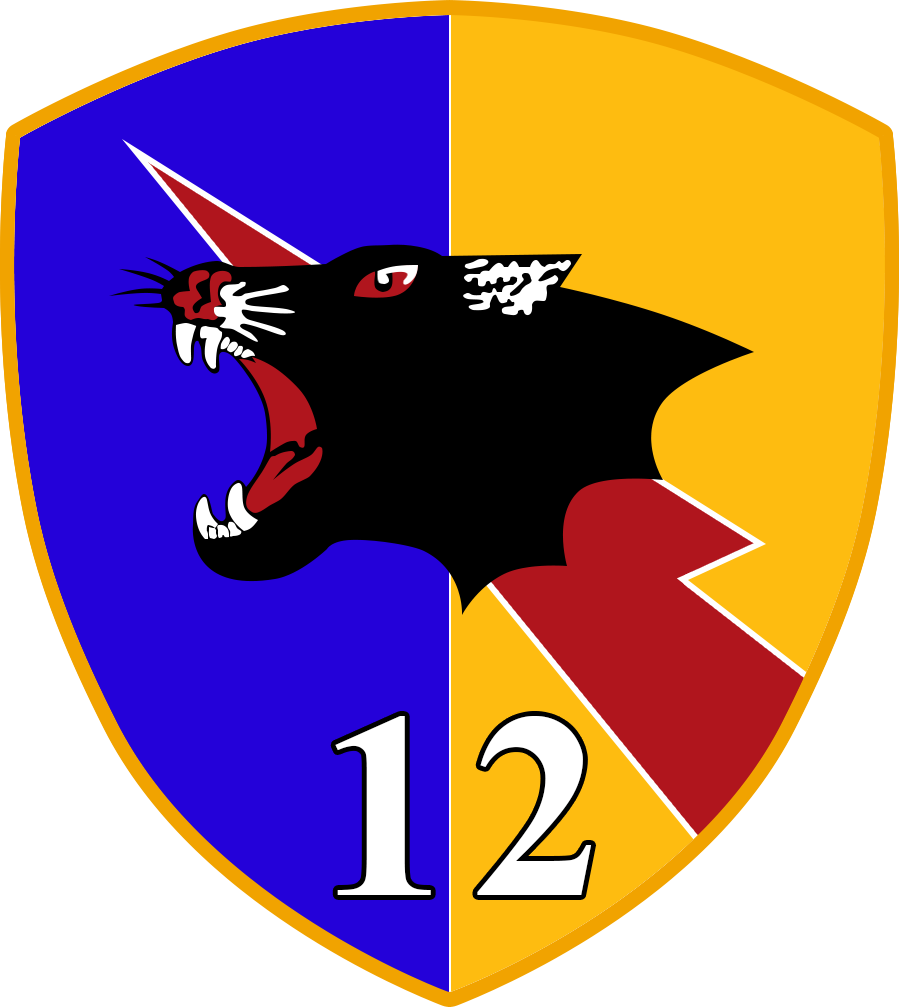
- 12th Air Squadron Badge
- Active: 12 September 1963
- Country: Indonesia
- Branch: Indonesian Air Force
- Type: Fighter
- Part of: 31st Air Wing
- Garrison/HQ: Roesmin Nurjadin Air Force Base
- Nicknames: Black Panther; Macan Hitam
- Motto: Nayaka Gagana Wijaya
- Mascot: Macan Hitam
- Anniversaries: 12 September
- Website: www.instagram.com/macan_hitam12/

Aircraft flown
- Fighter: Rafale EI/DI F4.1

12th Air Squadron (Indonesian: Skadron Udara 12 or Skadud 12 or SkU 12), also known as "Black Panther," is an air squadron of the Indonesian Air Force (TNI AU) based at Roesmin Nurjadin Air Force Base in Pekanbaru. As of May 2026, the squadron is equipped with the Dassault Rafale fighter aircraft.

Previously, this squadron operated the Hawk 109/209 type, which has been transferred to 1st Air Squadron based in Pontianak. 12th Air Squadron has operated various fighter aircraft, including the MiG-19 (1962–1970), MiG-21 Fishbed (1962–1970), A-4 Skyhawk (1980–2004), Hawk 109/209 (1996–2026), and currently operates the Dassault Rafale (2026–Present).

== History ==
12th Air Squadron, previously named Squadron 12, was first formed on 7 August 1962, alongside Squadron 14 and Squadron 41/42. This formation was in accordance with the Minister/Chief of Staff of the Air Force Decree Number 135 concerning the establishment of Fighter Squadron 12 with MiG-19 aircraft, Fighter Squadron 14 with MiG-21 aircraft, and Squadron 41/42 with Tu-16 long-range bomber aircraft.

On 12 September 1963, 12th Air Squadron was officially inaugurated, with Air Major Hashari Hasanuddin serving as its first squadron commander, based at Kemayoran, Central Jakarta. The core of its fleet consisted of MiG-19 and MiG-21 Fishbed aircraft manufactured by Eastern Bloc countries.

These squadrons were formed to prepare for Operation Trikora, the liberation of West Irian from the Dutch government. On 12 September 1963, Squadron 12 began serving under the 300th Wing of the National Air Defense Command (Kohanud) and was based at Kemayoran Air Force Base. Due to the lack of spare parts, 12th Air Squadron was temporarily deactivated as a combat unit of the Indonesian Air Force (TNI AU) in 1970.

The Chief of Staff of the Air Force issued Decree No. Skep/12/V/1983 regarding the reactivation of 12th Air Squadron at Iswahjudi Air Force Base, with the A-4 Skyhawk as its core force. On 12 March 1985, 12th Air Squadron relocated to Pekanbaru Air Force Base, led by the Squadron Commander, Lieutenant Colonel (Pilot) Hanafie Asnan. The relocation called "Ops Boyong" was to address a defensive gap in the Sumatran airspace; consequently, May 2, 1983, is recorded as the anniversary of the squadron's base in Pekanbaru.

In 2012 the Indonesian Hawks were repainted from their original brown-green camo to a two-tone grey. While one aircraft TT-0213 was painted in an experimental three-tone grey-blue camo. This was also later changed to the two-tone grey camo.

== Transition to Rafale ==
On 7 January 2026, 12th Air Squadron finally transferred a number of Hawk 109/209 fighter aircraft to the 1st Air Squadron, which is based at Supadio Air Force Base, Pontianak. The aircraft transfer procession was led directly by the Commander of the Air Force Operation Command (Pangkoopsau), Air Vice Marshal TNI Djoko Hadipurwanto. Replacing the Hawk 109/209s are the Dassault Rafale EI/DI F4.1 standard.

== Gallery ==
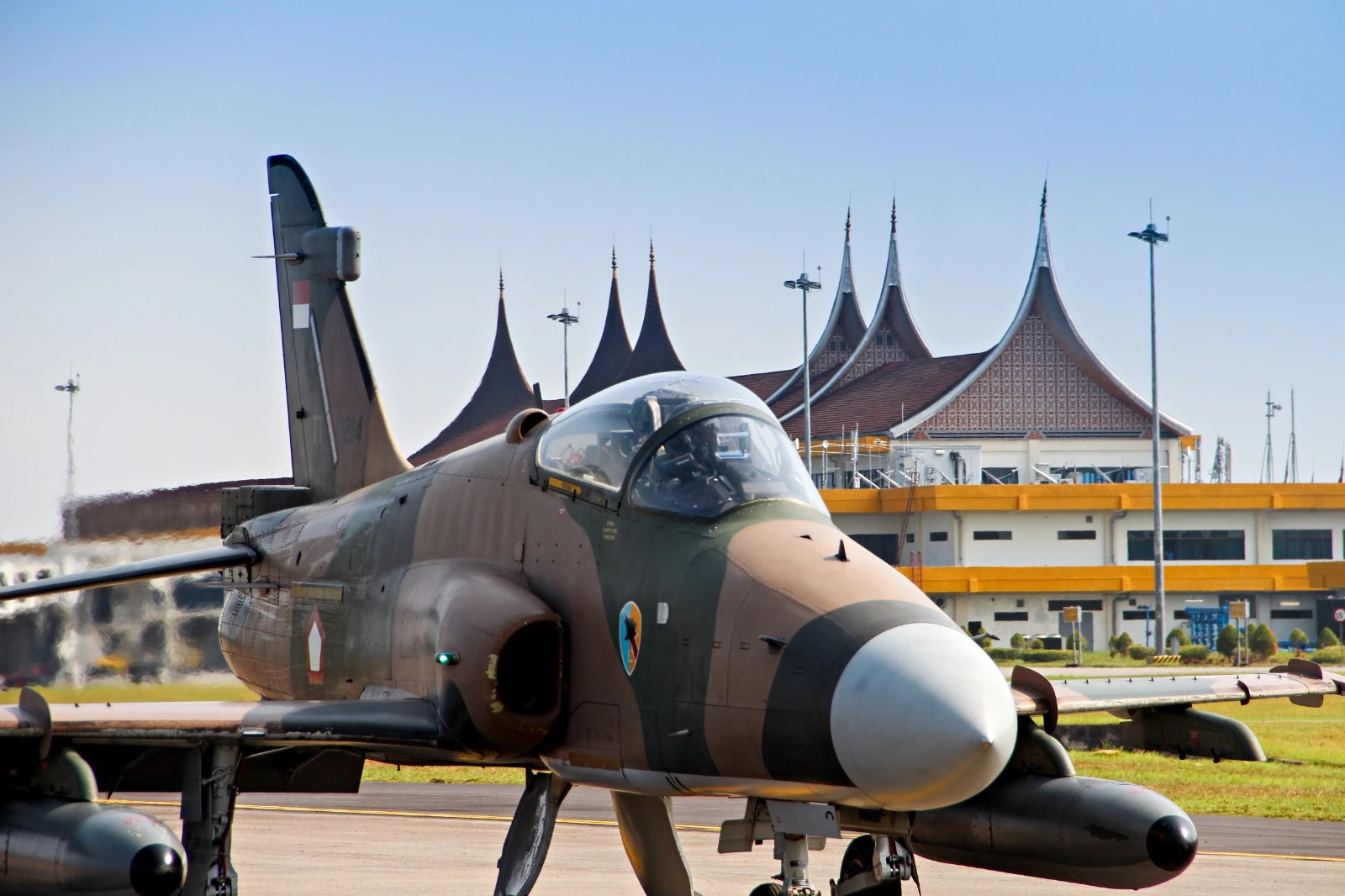
Hawk 209 in their original bicolour brown-green camo

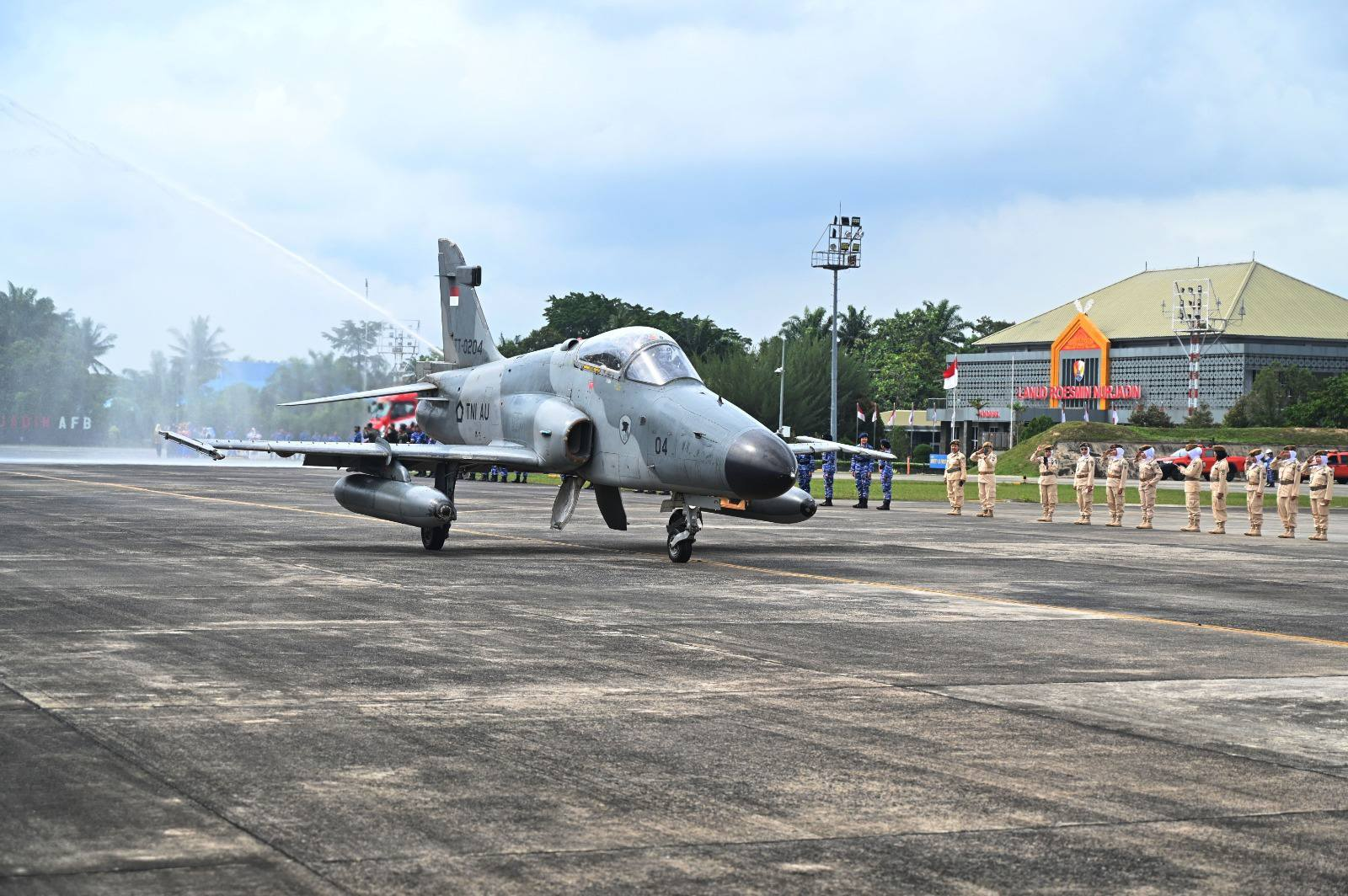
Hawk 209 with the later two-tone grey colour

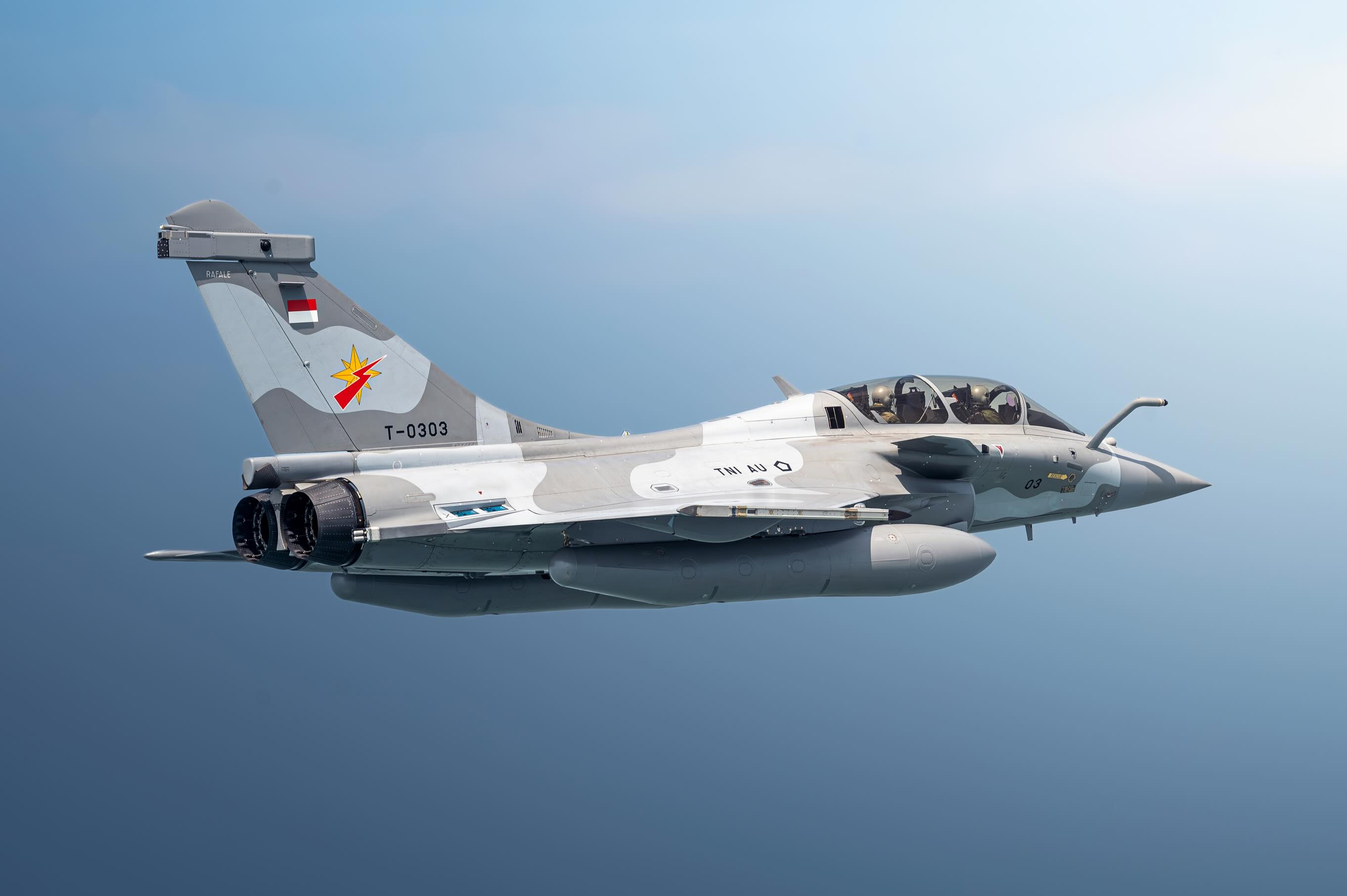
Dassault Rafale DI F4.1

== See also ==
- 31st Air Wing, a Fighter Wing stationed in Roesmin Nurjadin AFB, Pekanbaru.
- 1st Air Squadron, an F-16AM/BM Fighter Squadron stationed in Supadio AFB, Pontianak.
- 16th Air Squadron, an F-16C/D Fighter Squadron also stationed in Roesmin Nurjadin AFB, Pekanbaru.
