= Wings and Wheels =

- Status: Cancelled (2019)
- Genre: Air show
- Venue: Dunsfold Aerodrome
- Country: U.K.
- Established: 2005
- Website: Wings and Wheels

Wings and Wheels was a major airshow and motorsport event held since 2005 at Dunsfold Aerodrome which is home to Formula Woman and to BBC's motoring show, Top Gear. The aerodrome is now known as Dunsfold Park and owned by The Rutland Group. It is also home to a number of aircraft including the Vickers Vimy replica, NX71MY, which was retired to Brooklands Museum in November 2009. Wings and Wheels was officially cancelled in 2019 due to the economic climate.

== Charities ==
The show was held in support of local charities including Brooklands Museum, Cranleigh Village Hospital, CHASE and Help for Heroes and The Surrey Community Foundation.

== Aircraft ==
The flying display featured Hawker and British Aerospace (BAE Systems) products, coinciding with the aviation history of both Brooklands and Dunsfold. It also featured a number of warbirds such as North American P-51 Mustangs, Douglas Dakotas and North American B-25 Mitchells, reflecting its history as a World War 2 airfield, which also served postwar as a Hawker aircraft factory and flight test airfield from the 1950s until 2000.
