= British Aerospace Hawk 200 =

British single-seat, single-engine, subsonic light multirole fighter

Hawk 200
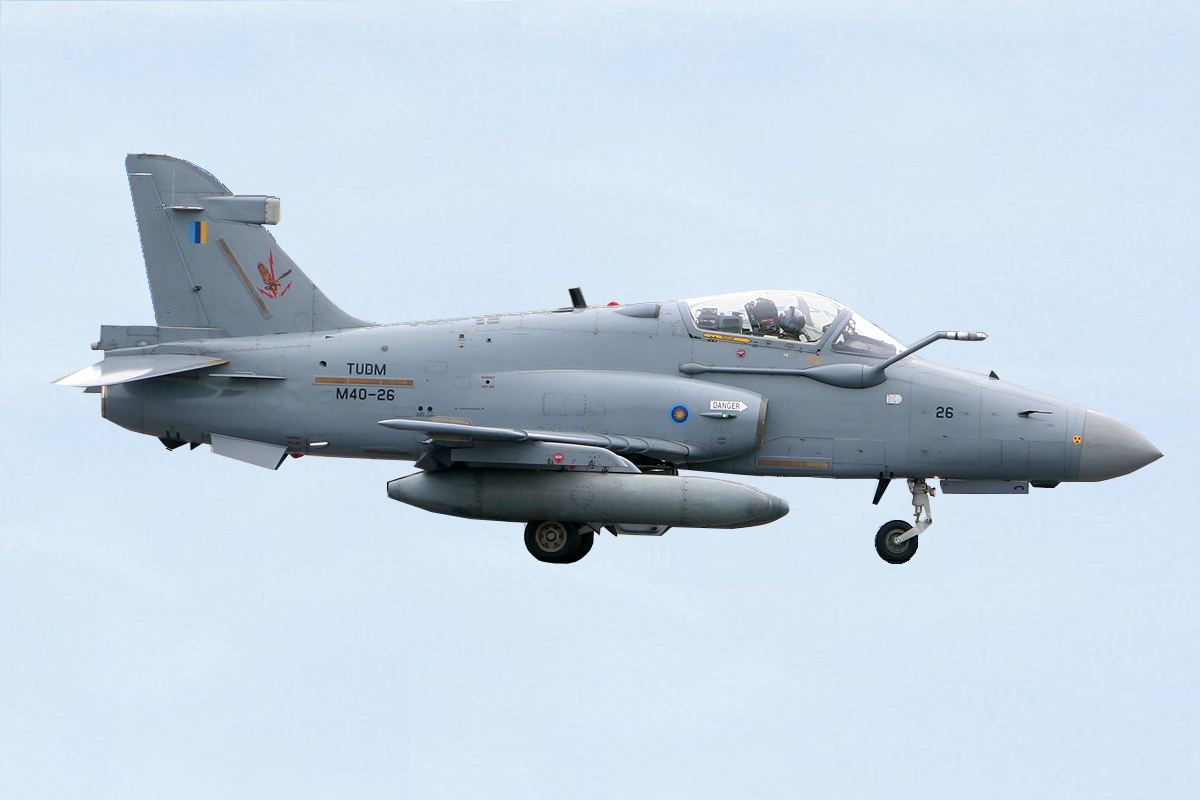
- RMAF BAE Hawk 208

General information
- Type: Light multirole fighter
- Manufacturer: British Aerospace
- Status: In service
- Primary users: Indonesian Air Force Royal Malaysian Air Force; Royal Air Force of Oman
- Number built: 62

History
- Manufactured: 1990–2002
- Introduction date: 1986
- First flight: 19 May 1986
- Developed from: BAE Systems Hawk

The British Aerospace Hawk 200 is a British single-seat, single-engine, subsonic light multirole fighter designed for air defence, air denial, anti-shipping, interdiction, close air support, and ground attack. Based on the BAE Systems Hawk, Hawk 200 was developed as a dedicated combat variant of the Hawk advanced trainer family for export market.

Distinctive features of Hawk 200 as compared to other Hawk variants are the wider and pointed nose, accommodating the Northrop Grumman AN/APG-66H radar, and the shorter canopy, being the only true single-seat Hawk variant.

== Development ==
In 1984, British Aerospace (now BAE Systems) decided to pursue development of a combat-orientated variant of the Hawk aircraft, designated as Hawk 200; up to this point the Hawk family had been typically employed by operators as an advanced trainer with secondary combat capabilities. A single flying demonstrator aircraft was produced to support the development process. This made its first flight on 19 May 1986.

Less than two months after first taking flight, the Hawk 200 demonstrator was lost in a fatal accident at Dunsfold Aerodrome, killing BAe test pilot Jim Hawkins; Hawkins is alleged to have either become disoriented or to have fallen unconscious, due to g-LOC (g induced loss of consciousness), while executing high-g manoeuvres to explore the aircraft's agility.

Despite the loss of the demonstrator, the company decided to proceed with the Hawk 200; by 1987, the first pre-production samples were being manufactured. In 1990, the Hawk 200 received its first order when Oman opted to procure a batch of twelve Hawk 203s, all of which were delivered by 1993.

== Design ==
=== Overview ===
The Hawk 200 is a single-seat, single engine light multirole fighter with a small visual signature and high manoeuvrability. It has a low-mounted cantilever wing and is powered by a single turbofan engine. The Hawk 200 differs from the earlier Hawks in having a new forward fuselage in which the forward cockpit area which normally houses a pilot is replaced by an electronics bay for avionics and onboard systems, including a fire control computer, multi-mode radar, laser rangefinder and forward-looking infrared (FLIR). The Hawk 200 also has an upgraded wing which, in addition to four wing pylons seen in previous Hawks, also has wingtip missile support as well as greater wing area, increased wing droop, larger flaps and an optional mid-air refuelling capability.

=== Weapons ===
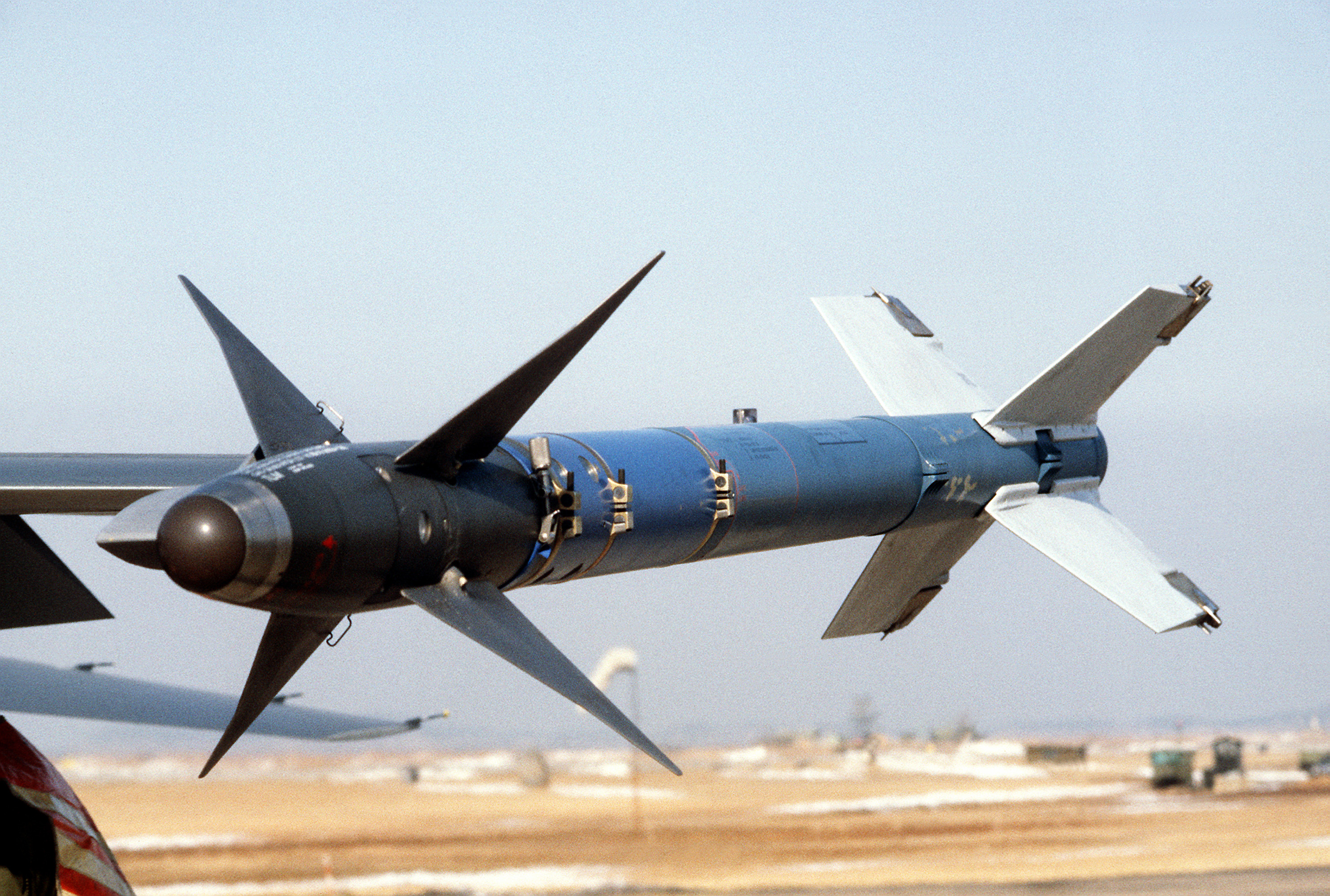
AIM-9L Sidewinder air-to-air missile

The Hawk 200 has 7 external store points with four underwing pylons, an under-fuselage pylon, and wingtip air-to-air missile stations. The range of external stores which the aircraft can carry includes air-to-air missiles (AAM), a gunpod, rocket launchers, reconnaissance pod, retarded and free-fall bombs up to 1,000 pounds (450 kg), runway cratering, anti-personnel and light armour bombs, cluster bombs (meanwhile prohibited), practice bomb and rocket carriers and external fuel tanks.

The Hawk 200 can launch many NATO standard guided missiles including AIM-9L Sidewinder AAM, ASRAAM AAM, AIM-120 AMRAAM AAM, AGM-65 Maverick AGM. The Hawk 200 can also carry a variety of bombs, including 113 kg bombs, 240 kg bombs, 540 kg bombs and Paveway II guided bombs. The AIM-9L Sidewinder missiles are launched from the wingtip air-to-air missile stations on each wing.

=== Sensors ===
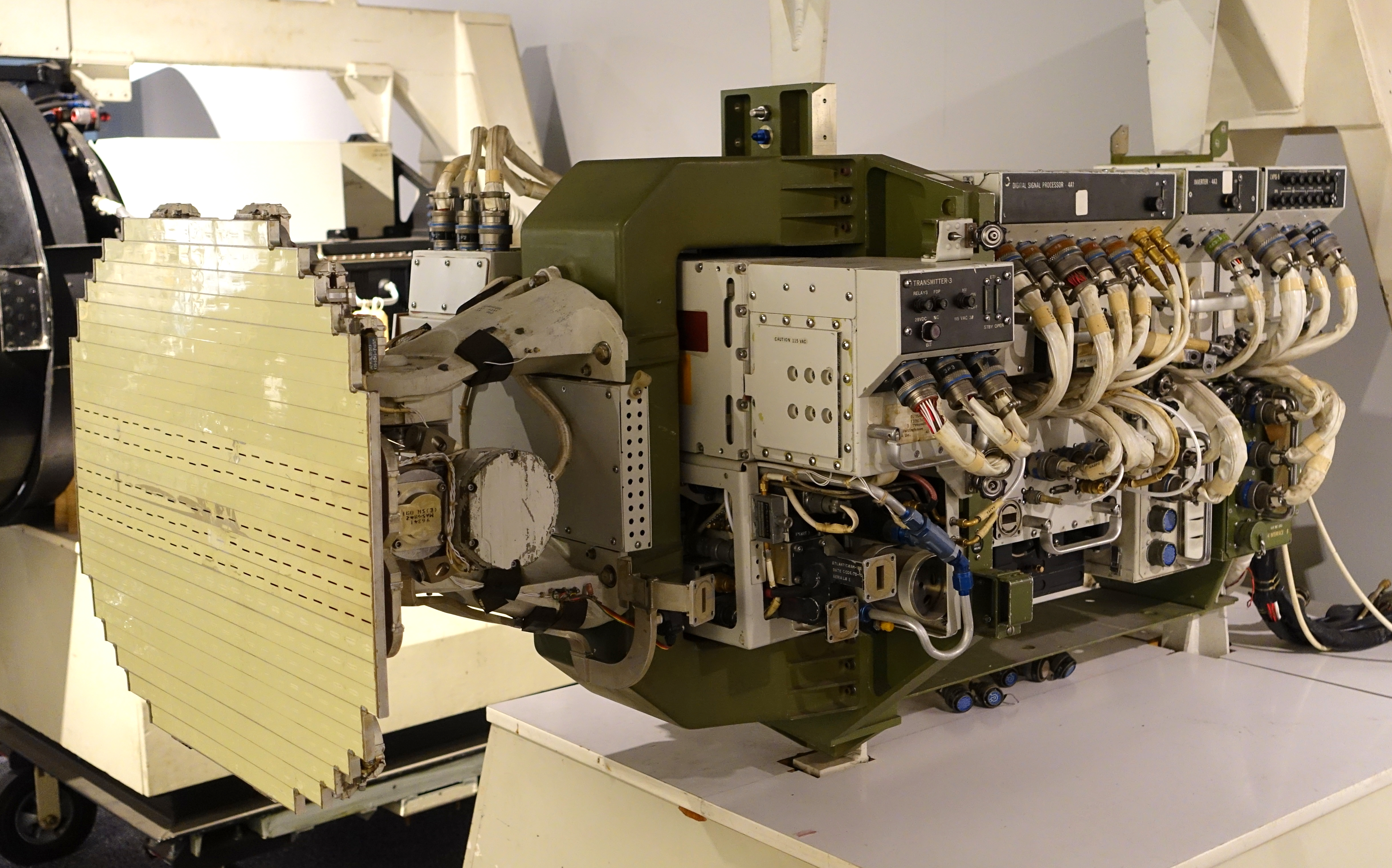
AN/APG-66 radar

The Hawk 200 is equipped with a Northrop Grumman AN/APG-66H multi-mode radar, LINS 300 ring laser gyroscope inertial navigation system, air data sensor, display processor and mission computer. The systems are connected with a dual MIL-STD-1553B digital bus. The Hawk 200 is also equipped with a Ferranti laser rangefinder and a Marconi forward-looking infrared. The self-protection systems include a BAE SkyGuardian 200 RWR and automatic or manual Vinten chaff/flare dispensers located above the engine exhaust.

The AN/APG-66 radar is a solid state medium range (up to 150 kilometres (93 mi)) pulse-doppler planar array radar designed by the Westinghouse Electric Corporation (now Northrop Grumman) for the F-16 Fighting Falcon. It has ten air-to-surface and ten air-to-ground modes for navigation and weapon aiming purposes. The APG-66H variant of the radar is installed on the Hawk 200, which has a smaller antenna for slightly reduced capabilities.

=== Cockpit ===
The pilot has a hands-on throttle and stick (HOTAS) control system and a wide-field-of-view head-up display (HUD). Using the weapon control panel, which controls the stores management system, the pilot can select the weapons and release mode prior to initiating an attack.

As in all other modernised Hawks, the Hawk 200's all-glass cockpit has a multi-functional colour display, with a dedicated processor and 15-colour graphics symbology generator. There are 27 display formats which provide flight and aircraft data. The cockpit is also compatible with night-vision goggles. Just outside of the cockpit is an inflight refuelling probe.

=== Engine ===
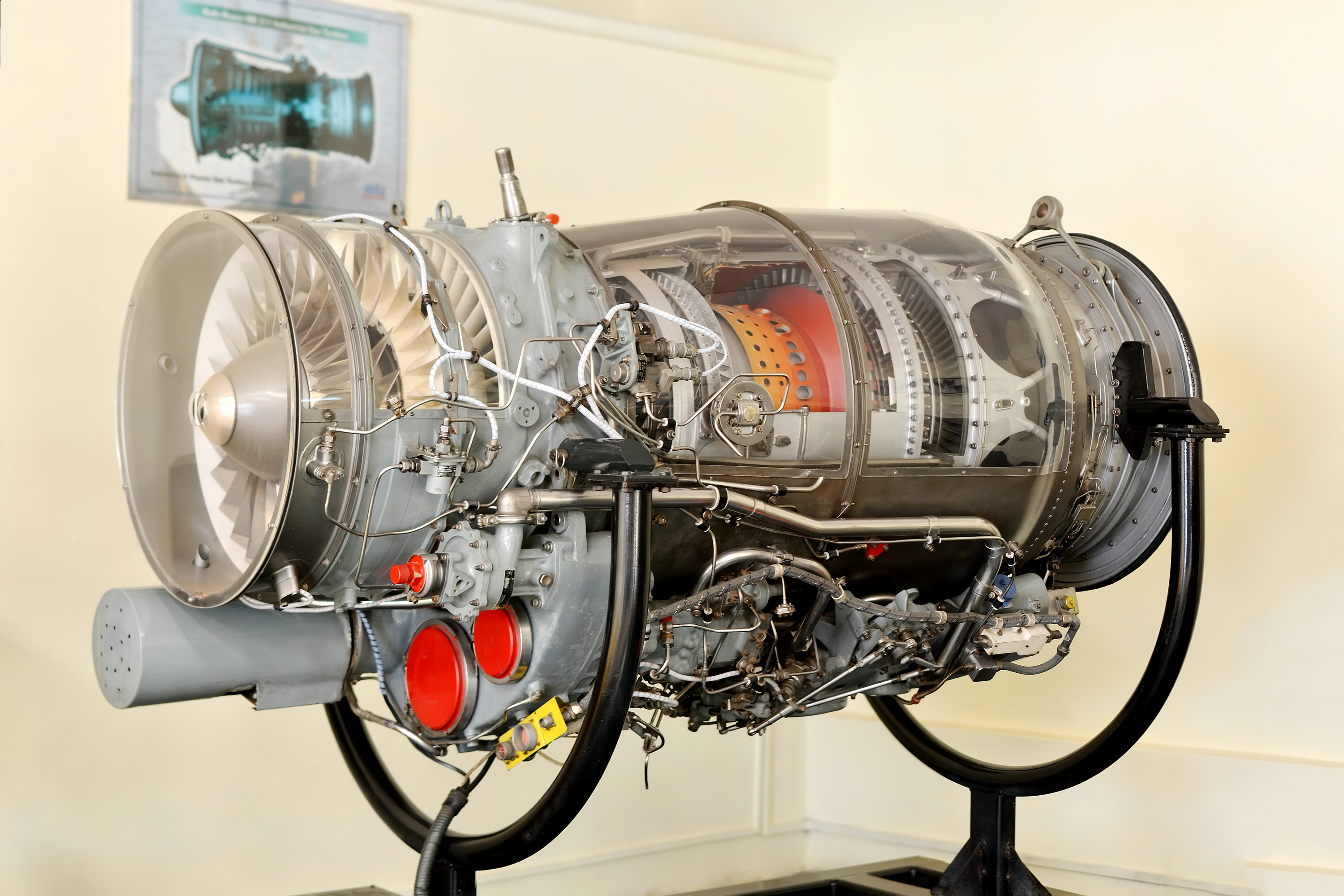
Adour engine on display

The Hawk 200 was originally powered by an Adour 871 two shaft, low bypass ratio turbofan engine from Rolls-Royce Turbomeca, providing the aircraft with 26.00 kN of thrust. In 2005, the Adour 951 engine was certified for use on the Hawk 200. The improved Adour 951 has improved performance (rated at 29.00 kN (6,520 lbf) thrust) and has up to twice the service life of the Adour Mk 871. It features an all-new fan and combustor, revised HP and LP turbines, and introduces Full Authority Digital Engine Control (FADEC).

Both engines are non-afterburning versions of the Adour series, and are fed by air intakes on both sides of the fuselage. The internal fuel tanks are installed in the fuselage and compartmented integral tanks located in the wings, containing up to 1361 kg of fuel. Up to two 591-litre drop tanks can also be carried on the inboard underwing pylons.

== Operational history ==
=== Indonesia ===
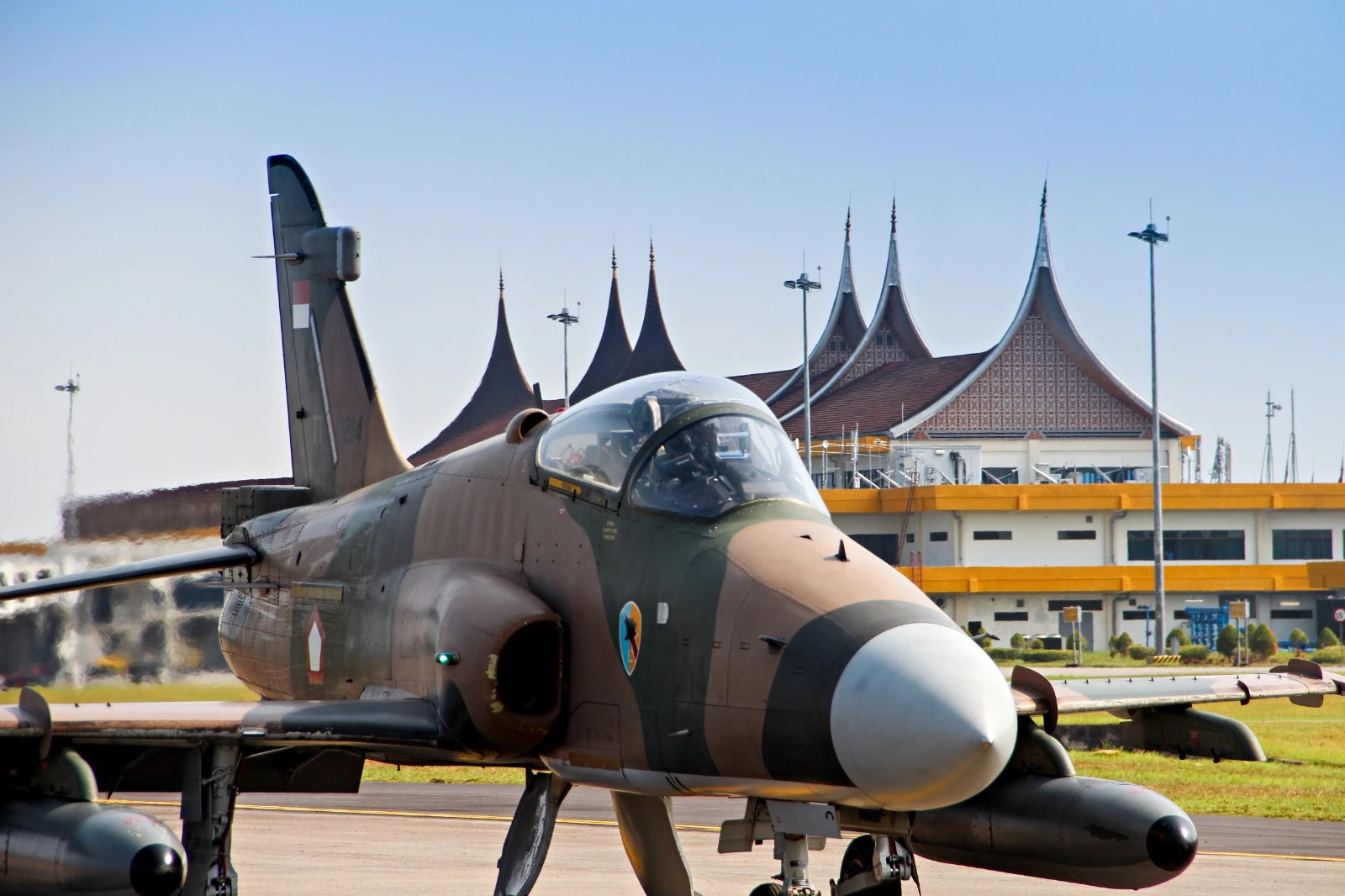
An Indonesian Air Force Hawk 209 with the old green-brown camouflage

During the 1999 East Timorese crisis, Indonesian Air Force Hawk 109s and Hawk 209s were stationed at the El Tari Airport in Kupang, West Timor to cover Indonesian military withdrawal from East Timor. On two occasions in September 1999, the Hawk 209s were sent to intercept Australian military aircraft. A Hawk 209 and a Hawk 109 were directed to intercept two RAAF F/A-18 Hornets heading for Indonesian airspace on 16 September and on 23 September, two Hawk 209s were scrambled to intercept an RAAF F-111 Aardvark that flew over East and West Timor.

As part of the preparation for the 2003–2004 Indonesian offensive in Aceh against the Free Aceh Movement (GAM) separatist, a flight of Hawk 209 were deployed to the Polonia Airport, Medan on 15 May 2003. On the first day of the offensive on 19 May, four Hawk 209s provided air covers for an airborne landing at Sultan Iskandar Muda Airport in Banda Aceh and a Marines amphibious landing in Samalanga, Bireuën Regency. The Hawk 209s also conducted show of force flight over GAM-held areas in Bireuën and Lhokseumawe. On 20 May, the second day of the offensive, two Hawk 209s escorted six C-130 Hercules that were carrying troops for airborne landing in Takengon area and then provided air cover for the landing. Few hours later, two Hawk 209s were again deployed for another sortie of the same detail. The Hawk 209 flight returned to their home base at Roesmin Nurjadin Air Base, Pekanbaru on 21 May 2003. During the deployment, the Hawk 209s were armed with LAU-131/A rocket pods for 2.75 in FFAR, which was shared with the OV-10 Broncos that were also based in Medan.

The 12th Air Squadron in Pekanbaru retired their Hawk 209s on 7 January 2026 and were going to be replaced with Dassault Rafales by the end of the month. Its remaining Hawks were transferred to the 1st Air Squadron in Pontianak.

=== Malaysia ===
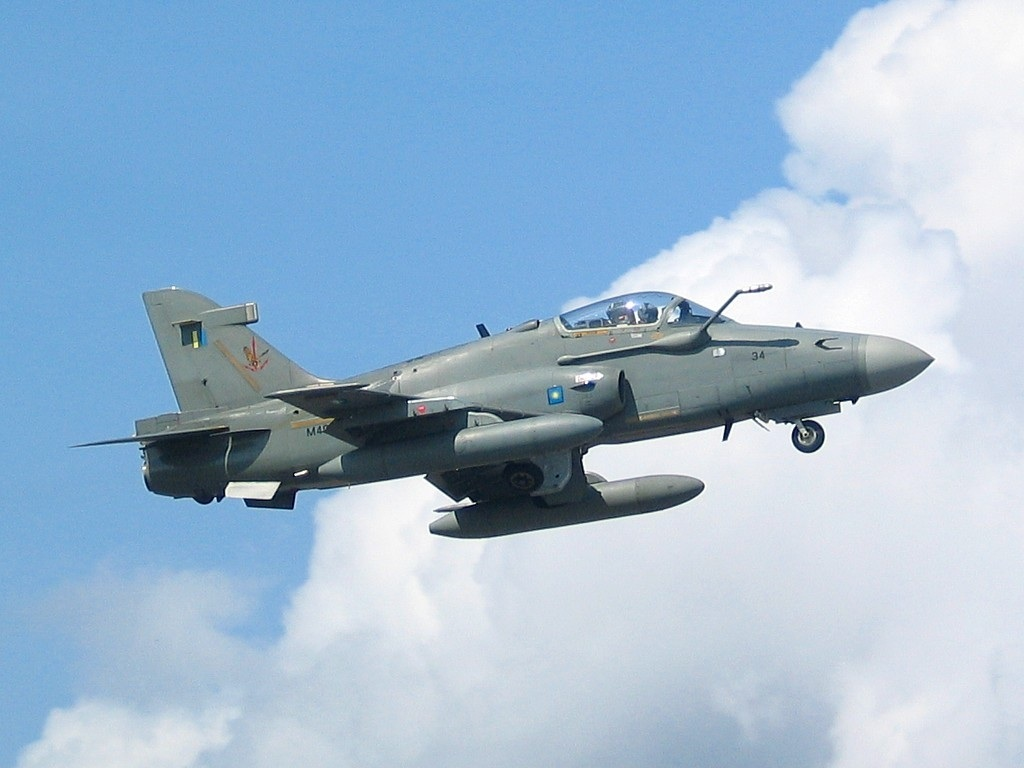
Hawk 208 of the Royal Malaysian Air Force

On 5 March 2013, amidst the 2013 Lahad Datu standoff, 5 Hawk 208s aircraft, along with 3 F-18D Hornets of the Royal Malaysian Air Force, were deployed in airstrikes on hideouts of the defunct sultanate and terrorist group Royal Security Forces of the Sultanate of Sulu in Lahad Datu, Sabah Malaysia ahead of the ground assault by joint forces of the Malaysian Army and Royal Malaysia Police.

The Hawk 208s flew 15 sorties, each Hawk 200 dropping Mk 82 unguided bombs in the first sortie and firing CRV7 rockets at additional ground targets on the second and third. A spokesman for Malaysian Prime Minister Najib Razak said in a phone interview that the objective of the airstrikes was to "soften the ground before troops move in".

== Variants ==
Hawk 203
Export version for the Royal Air Force of Oman
Hawk 205
Proposed export version for the Royal Saudi Air Force
Hawk 208
Export version for the Royal Malaysian Air Force.
Hawk 209
Export version for the Indonesian Air Force

== Operators ==
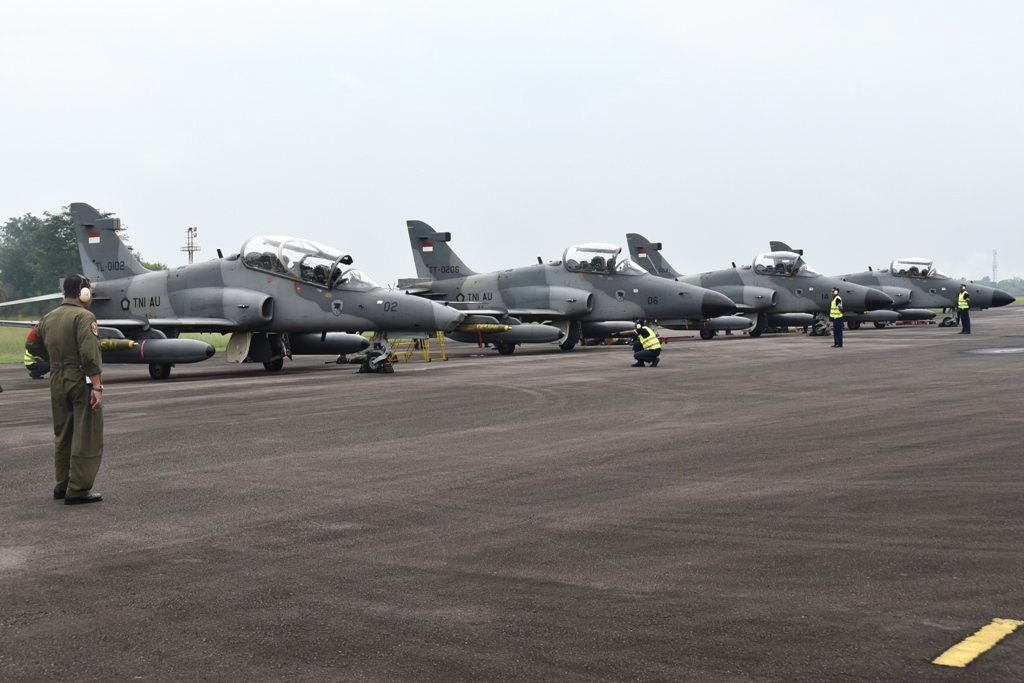
A Hawk 109 and three Hawk 209s of the 12th Air Squadron of the Indonesian Air Force, May 2017

Operator figures from flightglobal

Indonesia

- Indonesian Air Force – 21 aircraft left operational from an original of 32
  - 31st Air Wing
    - 1st Air Squadron "Elang"
    - 12th Air Squadron "Black Panther" (formerly)

Malaysia

- Royal Malaysian Air Force – 11 aircraft left operational from an original of 18
  - No. 6 Squadron
  - No. 15 Squadron (formerly)

Oman

- Royal Air Force of Oman – 10 aircraft left operational from an original of 12
  - No. 6 Squadron

== Notable accidents ==
- On 15 June 2020, an Indonesian Air Force Hawk 209 TT-0209 crashed in a residential area of Kampar, Riau. The pilot, First Lt. Apriyanto, was able to eject himself and survived the accident. He was subsequently examined at dr. Soekirman Air Force Hospital in Pekanbaru.

== Aircraft on display ==
Indonesia

- TT-1208 Hawk Mk.209 on display at 1st Air Force Operations Command, Halim Perdanakusuma AFB, East Jakarta, Jakarta
- TT-1216 Hawk Mk.209 on display at Aneuk Galong intersection, Aceh Besar Regency, Aceh
- TT-0229 Hawk Mk.209 on display near Dumpil (Madiun) freeway toll gate in Madiun Regency, East Java
- TT-1205 Hawk MK.209 on display at Universitas Pertahanan

== Specifications ==
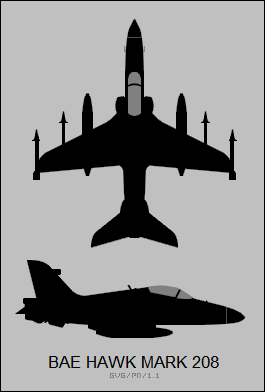

Data from

General characteristics

- Crew: 1
- Length: 11.38 m (37 ft 4 in)
- Wingspan: 9.39 m (30 ft 10 in)
- Height: 4.16 m (13 ft 8 in)
- Wing area: 16.69 m^{2} (179.6 sq ft)
- Aspect ratio: 5.3
- Empty weight: 4,128 kg (9,101 lb)
- Max takeoff weight: 9,101 kg (20,064 lb)
- Fuel capacity: 1,360 kg (3,000 lb) internal: 3,210 kg (7,080 lb) with 3 drop tanks
- Powerplant: 1 × Rolls-Royce Turbomeca Adour Mk 871 non-afterburning turbofan, 26 kN (5,800 lbf) thrust

Performance

- Maximum speed: 1,037 km/h (644 mph, 560 kn) at sea level
- Maximum speed: Mach 1.2 (never exceed at altitude)
- Cruise speed: 796 km/h (495 mph, 430 kn) at 12,500 m (41,000 ft)
- Stall speed: 197 km/h (122 mph, 106 kn) flaps down
- Range: 892 km (554 mi, 482 nmi) internal fuel only
- Combat range: 617 km (383 mi, 333 nmi) with 3x Sea Eagle and 2x 592 L (156 US gal; 130 imp gal)
- Ferry range: 1,950 km (1,210 mi, 1,050 nmi) with 3 drop tanks
- Service ceiling: 15,250 m (50,030 ft)
- g limits: +8 -3
- Rate of climb: 58.466 m/s (11,509.1 ft/min)

Armament

- Hardpoints: Total of 5: 4 × under-wing; and 1 × under-fuselage; and 2 hard points inboard the wingtip on British aircraft , with provisions to carry combinations of:
  - Other:
  - Reconnaissance pod
  - Up to 3 drop tanks for ferry flight or extended range/loitering time

Avionics

- AN/APG-66
- Marconi forward-looking infrared

== See also ==
Related development

- BAE Systems Hawk
- McDonnell Douglas T-45 Goshawk

Aircraft of comparable role, configuration, and era

- Aero L-159 Alca
- KAI T-50 Golden Eagle
- AMX International AMX
