= List of Lockheed C-130 Hercules operators =

The Lockheed C-130 Hercules is a multipurpose military transport aircraft used by many states around the world, this is a list of the current and former operators.

== Current operators ==
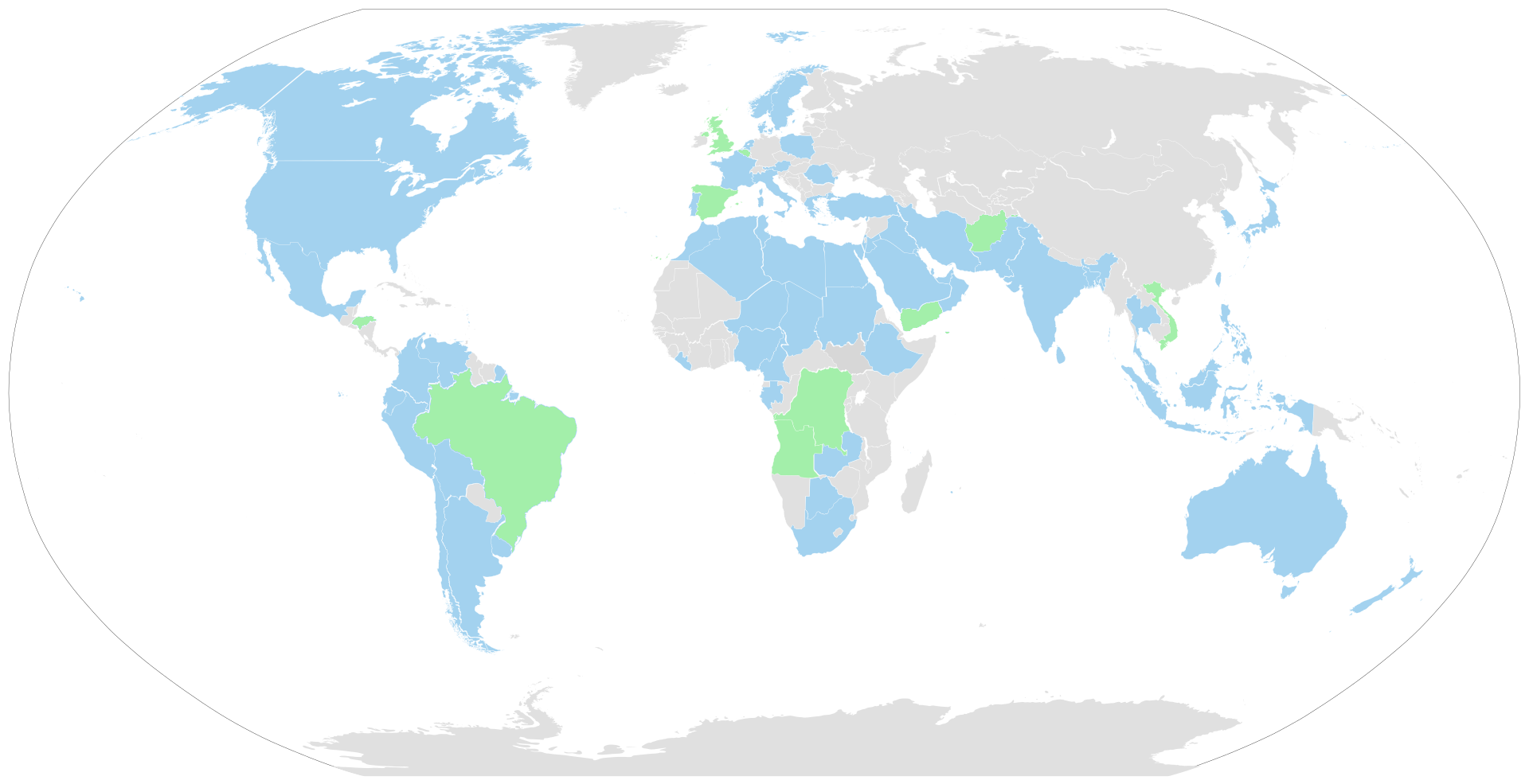
Military operators: Current Former

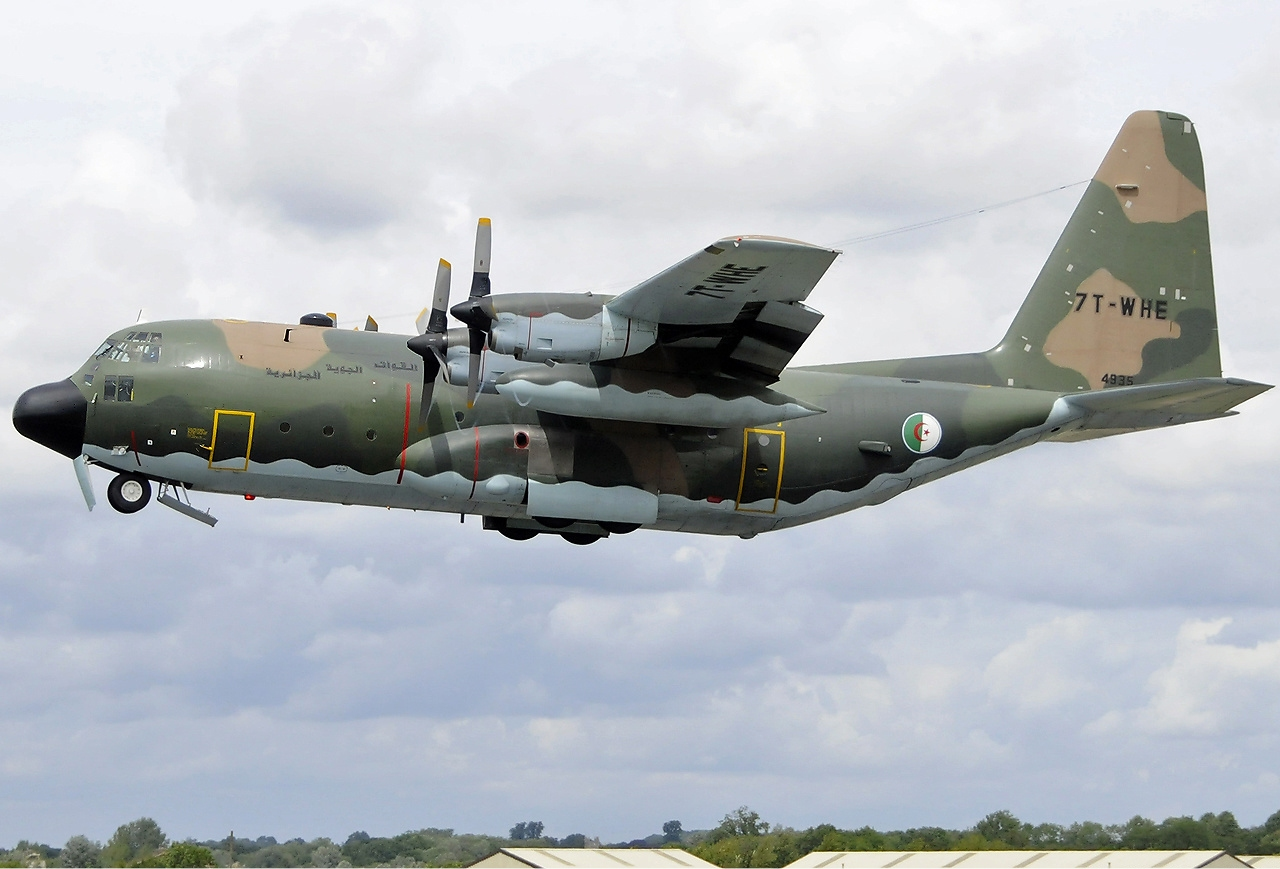
An Algerian Air Force C-130H

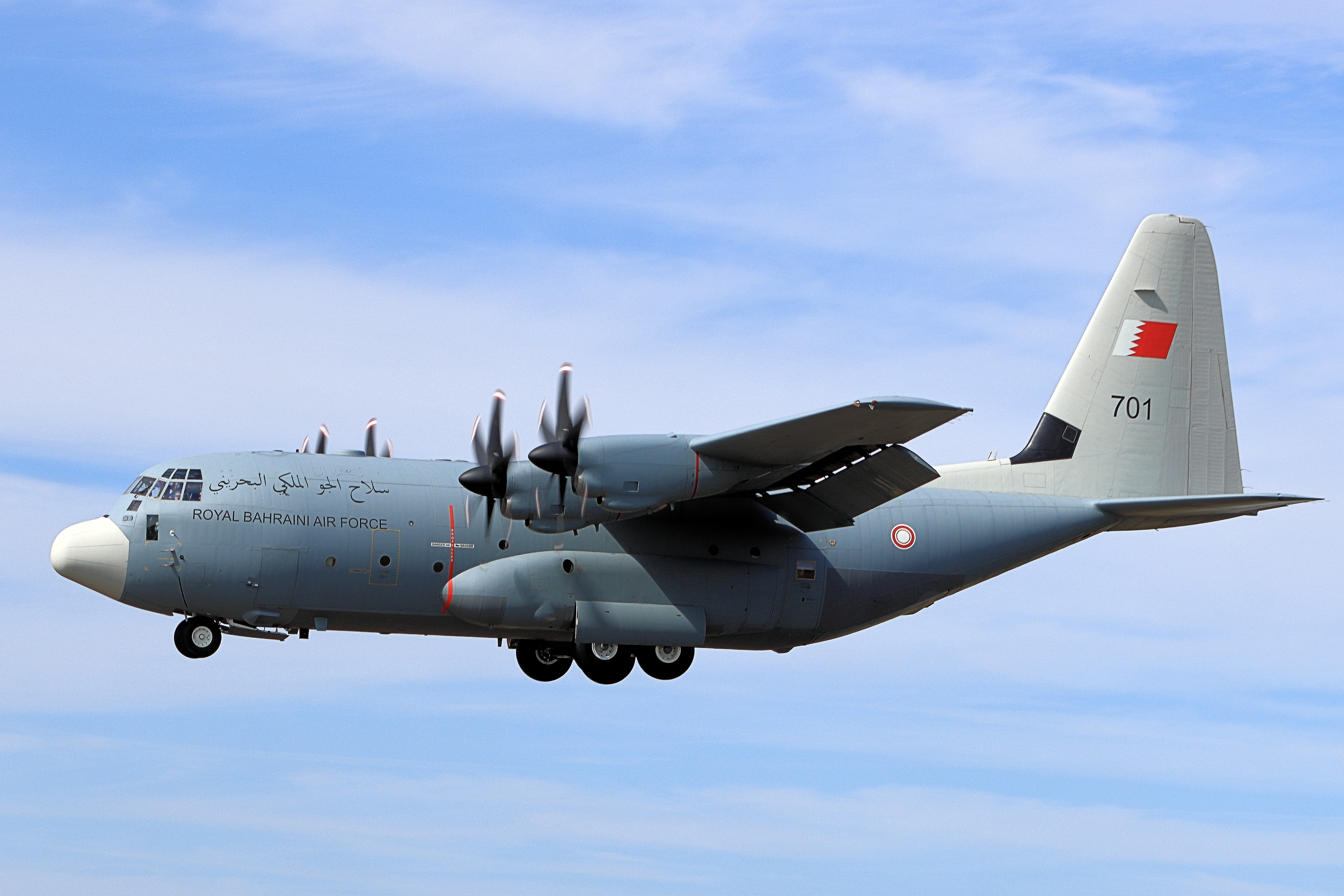
A C-130J with the Bahraini Air Force

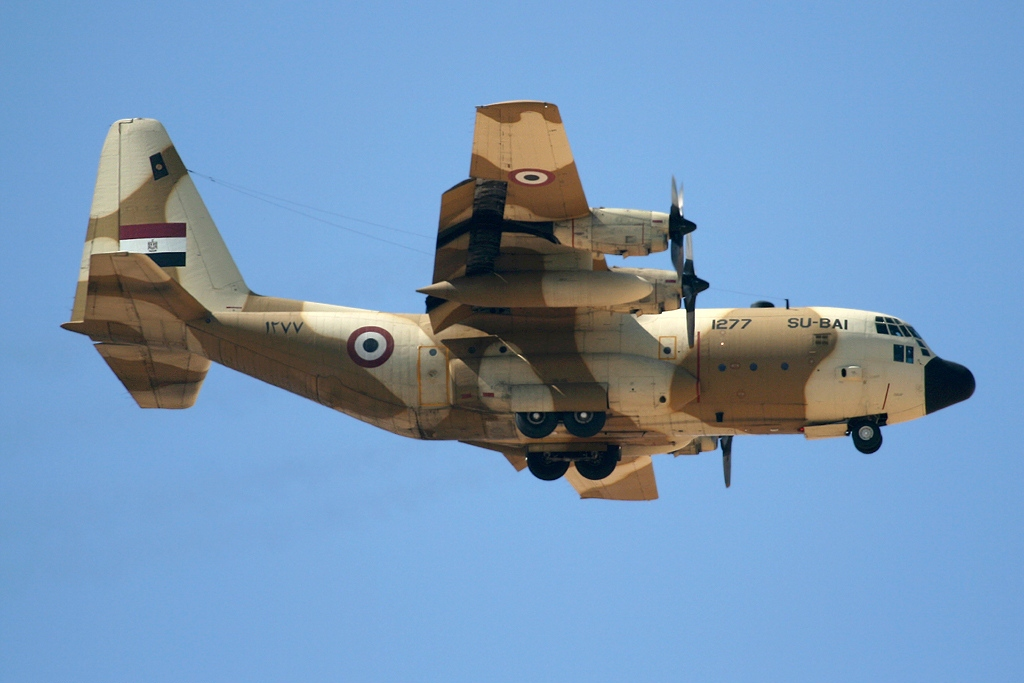
Egyptian Air Force C-130H

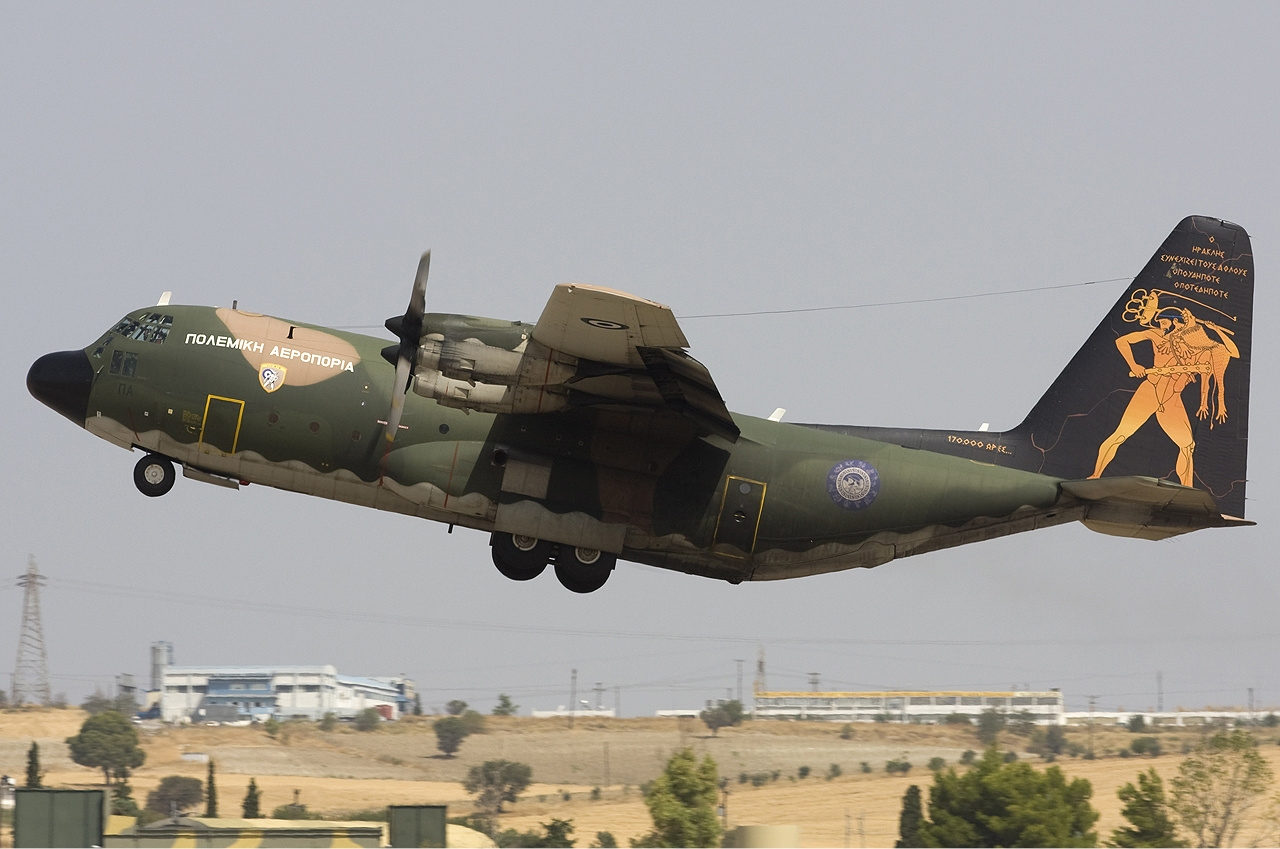
Hellenic C-130H taking off

Algeria
Algeria – Algerian Air Force:
- 2ème Escadre de Transport Tactique et Logistique (three squadrons) – Boufarik Airport
Argentina
Argentine Air Force
Australia
Royal Australian Air Force 12 C-130H (20 on order)
Austria
Austrian Air Force
- Lufttransportstaffel (Linz/Horsching) (C-130K)
Bahrain
Royal Bahraini Air Force
Bangladesh
Bangladesh – Bangladesh Air Force
Bolivia
Bolivia – Bolivian Air Force
Botswana
Botswana Air Force
Cameroon
Cameroon Air Force
Canada
Royal Canadian Air Force, 26 in use as of January 2025
- 7 C-130H Hercules
- 2 C-130H-30 Hercules
- 17 C-130J-30 Super Hercules Coulson Aviation, used as airtankers for use on wildfires.
Chad
Chad Air Force
Chile
Chilean Air Force
Colombia
Colombian Aerospace Force
Denmark
Royal Danish Air Force
Ecuador
Ecuadorian Air Force
Egypt
Egyptian Air Force:
- Squadrons 4 and 16 flying C-130s from Cairo International Airport
Ethiopia
Ethiopian Air Force – two aircraft:
- The Dutch Aviation Society "Scramble" reports that 15 Squadron operates C-130Es and L-100-30s from Harar Meda Airport, Bishoftu.
France
French Air and Space Force
Gabon
Gabon Air Force
Germany
German Air Force
Greece
Hellenic Air Force
India
Indian Air Force
Indonesia
Indonesian Air Force

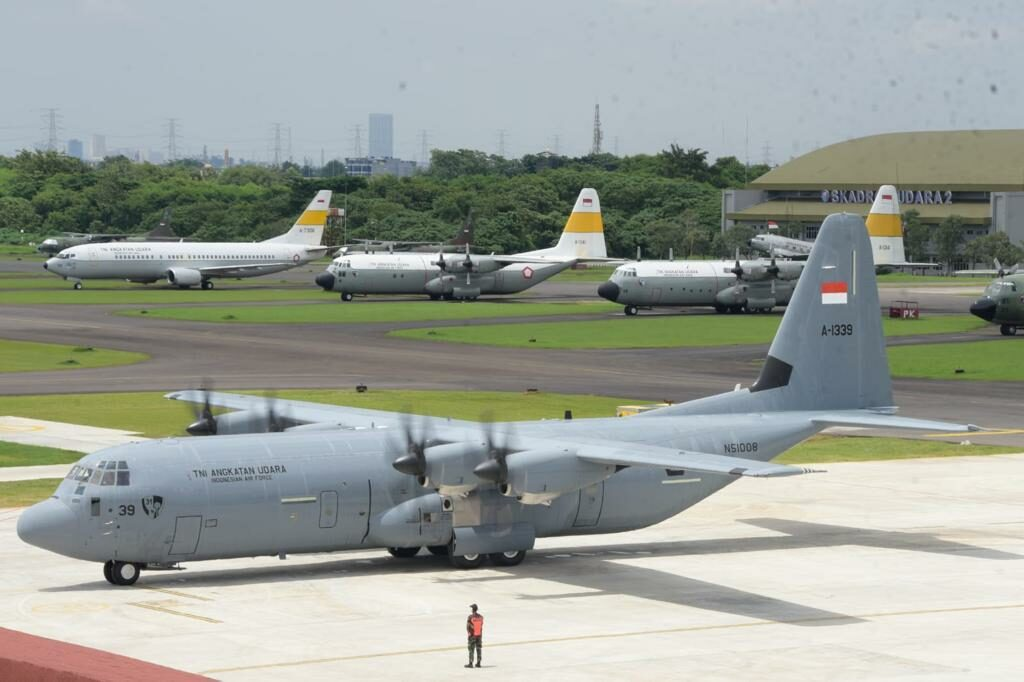
Indonesian C-130J-30 Super Hercules with other C-130s and a Boeing 737-400 at Halim Perdanakusuma Air Force Base in Jakarta

- 31st Air Squadron
- 32nd Air Squadron
- 33rd Air Squadron The Indonesian Air Force began operating the C-130 in the 1960s with a fleet of 8 C-130Bs transport aircraft and 2 KC-130B tankers. The aircraft purchase was part of a deal between the United States and Indonesia to secure the release of Allen Lawrence Pope, a CIA pilot captured while conducting covert operations in support of Permesta rebels in the Moluccas. With this purchase Indonesia became the very first foreign operator of the aircraft in the world. Since then, the aircraft has been the backbone of its airlift capabilities, being used to carry both military supplies and humanitarian aid. Over the years the Indonesian Air Force has added newer models to its fleet by acquiring second hand C-130Hs from the Royal Australian Air Force as well as brand new C-130J-30 Super Hercules. The Indonesian Air Force has also suffered the loss of several C-130 aircraft in multiple accidents. This included the loss of one of its two KC-130 tankers, significantly reducing its aerial refueling capability. Currently Indonesia operates a total of 25 C-130 models this includes one KC-130, eight L-100-30s, 12 C-130B/H/H-30s, and five C-130J-30 Super Hercules.
Iran
Islamic Republic of Iran Air Force
Iraq
Iraqi Air Force
Israel

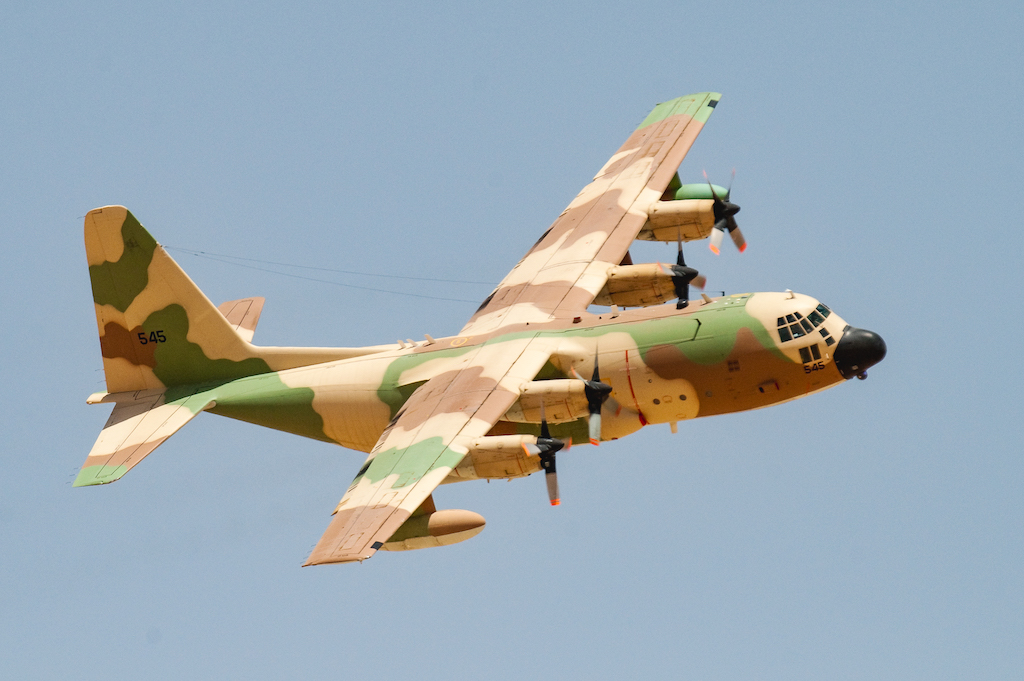
Israeli KC-130H Hercules

Israeli Air Force
Italy
Italian Air Force
Japan
Japan Air Self-Defense Force
- 401st Tactical Airlift Squadron – JASDF Komaki Base

The Japan Defense Agency ordered the C-130H which was the newest model in 1981. The Japan Air Self-Defense Force (JASDF) purchased 16 in total to replace aging C-1 and YS-11P aircraft. The C-130Hs were received from 1984 to 1998. JASDF C-130Hs were active in Iraq from 2004 to 2008. Two C-130Hs (95-1080 and 95–1083) have been equipped with aerial fuel-receiving and refueling functions, making them of KC-130H standard. This provides the JASDF with the ability to refuel the UH-60J search and rescue helicopters of its Air Rescue Wing.

Japan – Japan Maritime Self-Defense Force
- Air Transport Squadron 61 – JMSDF Atsugi Base

The JMSDF bought six used KC-130R aircraft that were in storage, having been previously operated by the US Marines. There was some speculation that they may be used as gunships with the Harvest HAWK kit. In actuality they were purchased to replace three aging YS-11M/M-A aircraft of Air Transport Squadron 61. Their air to air refueling equipment was removed, making them of C-130R standard. Corrosion repair was done and the aircraft were refitted with new landing gear supports, cargo door supports and center wing rainbow fittings. In addition to structural modifications, Japan received thirty overhauled Allison T56-A-16 engines and digital cockpit upgrades to include a digital GPS. Regeneration of the first aircraft began in November 2012 and was planned to be completed by Fall 2013. The six C-130Rs were supplied from 2014 to 2016.

Algeria
- –
- –
- –
- –
- –
- –
- –
- – Niger – Niger Air Force
Jordan
Royal Jordanian Air Force
Kuwait
Kuwait Air Force
Libya

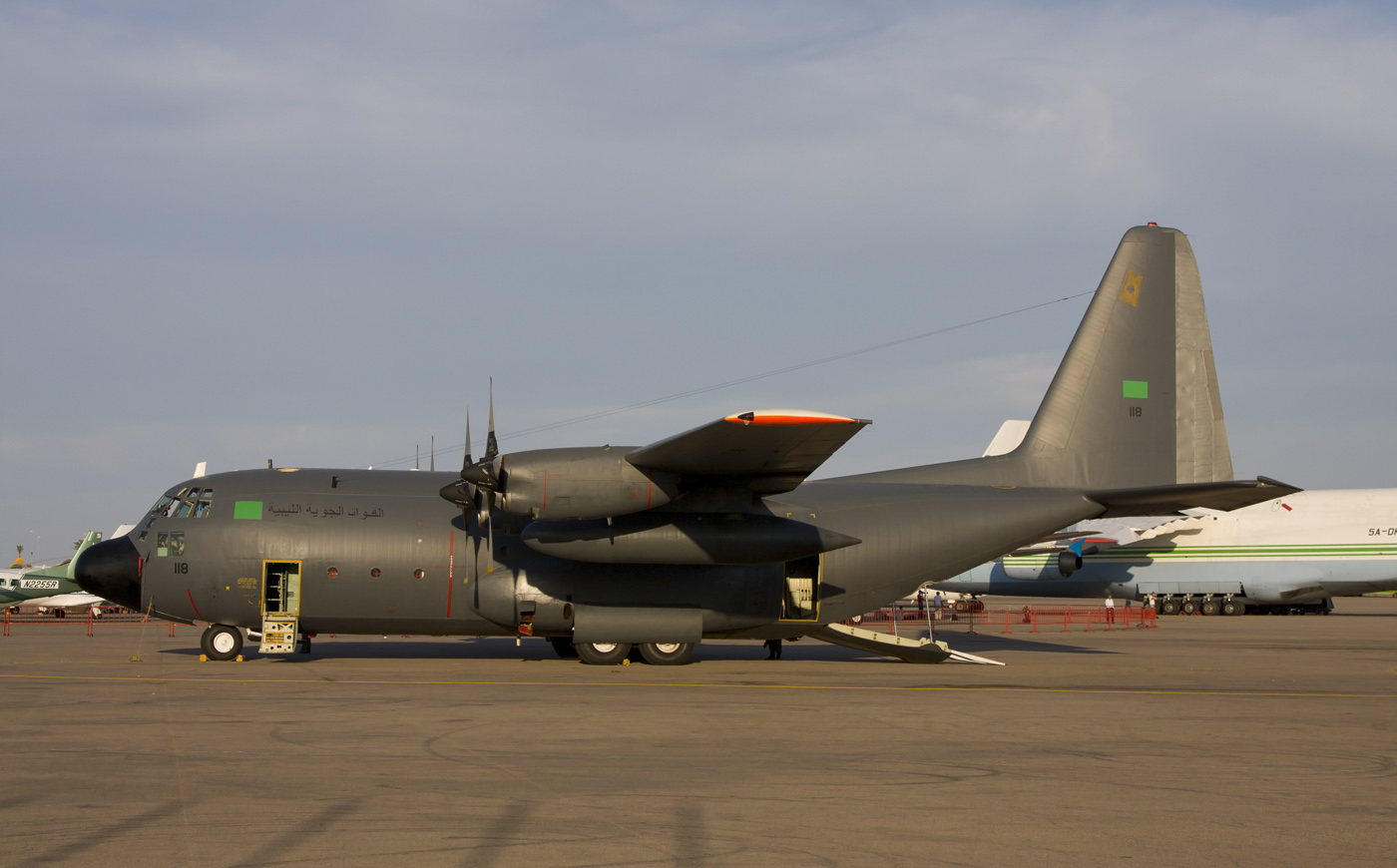
A Libyan C-130H in 2009

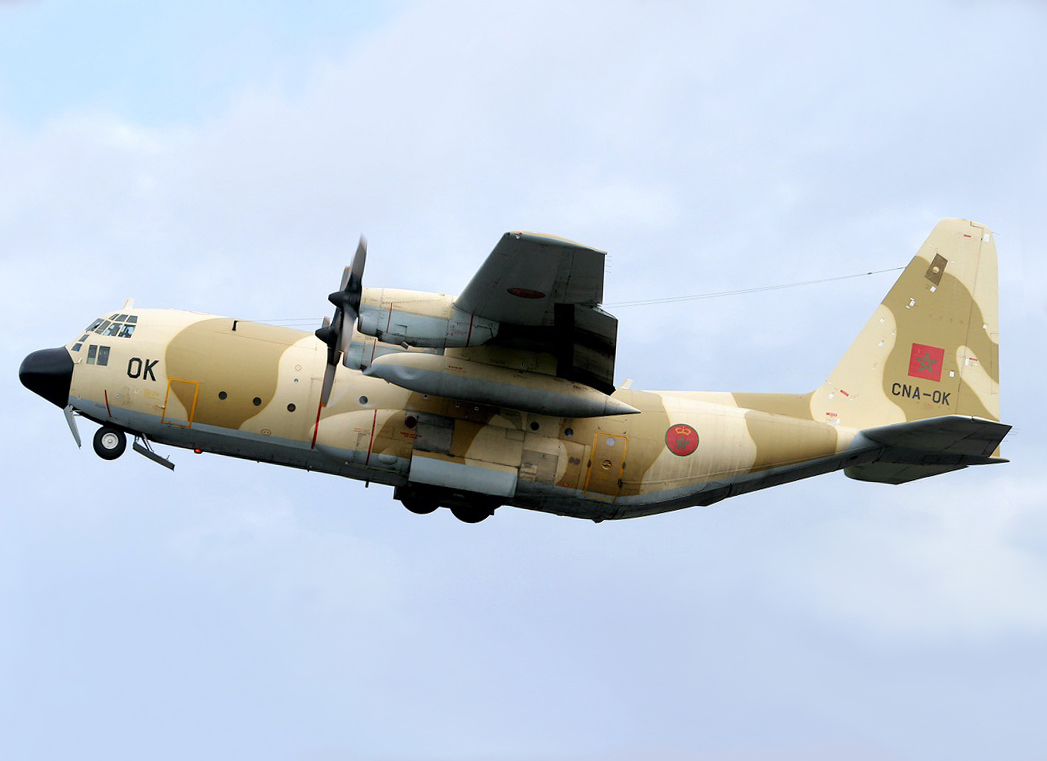
Royal Moroccan Air Force Lockheed C-130H Hercules

Libyan Air Force. Previously operated by the Libyan Air Force under Colonel Muammar Gaddafi's rule until 2011. Sixteen C-130H were ordered, but only eight were delivered, and the remaining aircraft embargoed in 1971.
Malaysia
Royal Malaysian Air Force - distributed to 14 Sqn based at Labuan and 20 Sqn at Subang.
Mexico
Mexican Air Force
Morocco
Royal Moroccan Air Force
- 3rd Royal Moroccan Air Base/Escadre de Transport based at Kenitra Air Base (C-130H)
Netherlands
Royal Netherlands Air and Space Force
New Zealand
Royal New Zealand Air Force
- No. 40 Squadron RNZAF, RNZAF Base Auckland
Nigeria
Nigerian Air Force
- 301 Heavy Airlift Group based at Lagos/Murtala Muhammed International Airport (C-130H, C-130H-30). On 26 September 1992 a Nigerian C-130H, serial number 911 crashed three minutes after take-off from Lagos, when three engines failed possibly due to high take-off weight. All 158 people on board were killed, including eight foreign nationals.
Norway
Royal Norwegian Air Force
Oman
Royal Air Force of Oman
Pakistan
Pakistan Air Force
Peru
Peruvian Air Force
Philippines
Philippine Air Force
- 222nd Airlift Sq, 220th Airlift Wing – 5 C-130 based in Mactan-Benito Ebuen Airbase, 2 C-130H and 2 C-130T equipped with SABIR Maritime Patrol delivered in 2015. are currently operational, 1 C-130B are undergoing repairs.
Poland
Polish Air Force
Portugal
Portuguese Air Force
Qatar
Qatar Emiri Air Force
Romania
Romanian Air Force
Saudi Arabia
Royal Saudi Air Force
Singapore
Republic of Singapore Air Force
South Africa
South African Air Force
South Korea
Republic of Korea Air Force
Sri Lanka
Sri Lanka Air Force
Sudan
Sudanese Air Force
Sweden
Swedish Air Force
Taiwan
Republic of China Air Force
Thailand
Royal Thai Air Force
Tunisia
Tunisian Air Force
Turkey
Turkish Air Force
United Arab Emirates
United Arab Emirates Air Force
United States

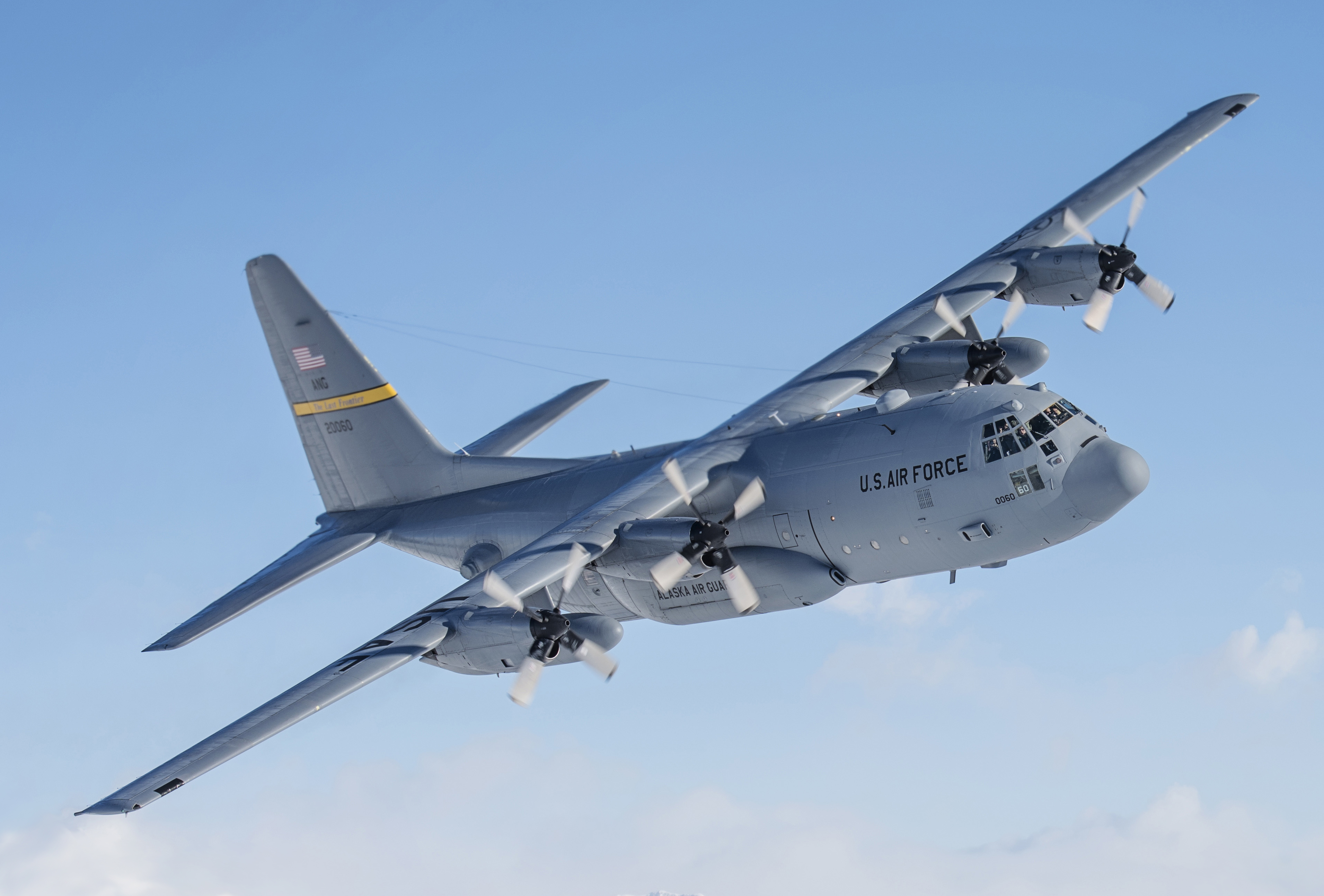
A USAF C-130H Hercules over Denali National Park

- United States Air Force
- United States Coast Guard
- United States Marine Corps
- United States Navy
- California Department of Forestry and Fire Protection
- International Air Response
- NOAA Hurricane Hunters
Uruguay
Uruguayan Air Force
Venezuela
Venezuelan Air Force

== Future operators ==
Vietnam
Vietnam People's Air Force -The U.S. Department of State has made a determination approving a possible Foreign Military Sale to the Government of Vietnam for C-130 Sustainment services and related equipment. The estimated total cost is $100 million.

== Former operators ==
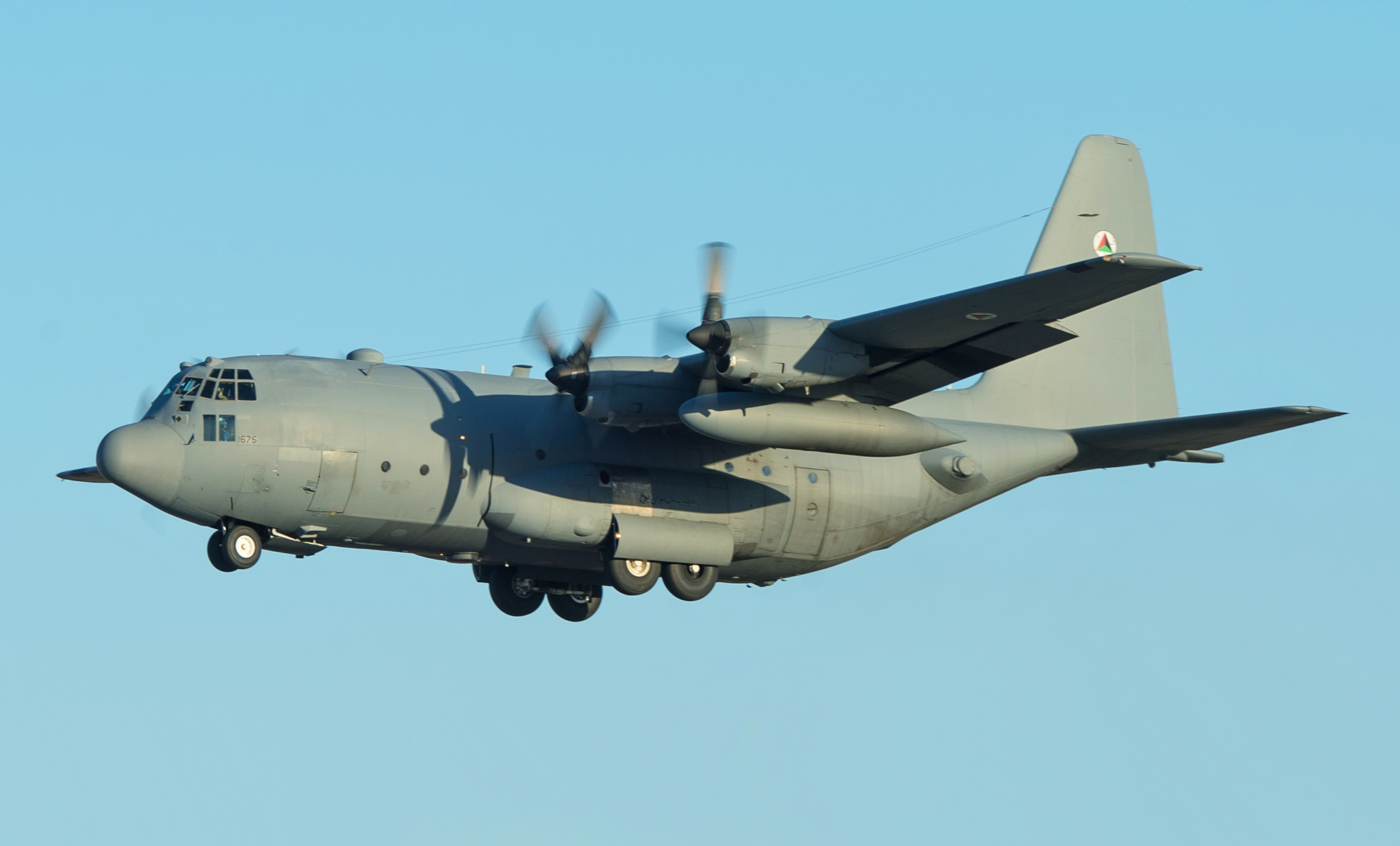
An Afghan Air Force C-130H now inoperable with the fall of Afghanistan in 2021

Islamic Republic of Afghanistan
Afghan Air Force
Belgium
Belgian Air Component (replaced by the A400M)
Brazil
Brazilian Air Force (replaced by the C-390)
Honduras
Honduras Air Force
Spain
Spanish Air Force
United Kingdom
Royal Air Force – The Royal Air Force began using the C-130K in the mid-1960s designated Hercules C.1. Some aircraft were lengthened and redesignated the C.3. From 1998 they took into service 10 standard C-130J as the Hercules C.4 and 15 lengthened C-130J-30 as the C.5. The decision was made to replace the Hercules with the Airbus A400M Atlas and the last C-130Js were withdrawn from service at end of June 2023 for sale.
South Vietnam
South Vietnam Air Force
Vietnam
Vietnam People's Air Force – Captured ex-South Vietnam Air Force C-130.
Yemen
Yemen Arab Republic Air Force
Zaire
Country known today as the Democratic Republic of the Congo

== See also ==
- Lockheed AC-130
- Lockheed DC-130
- Lockheed EC-130
- Lockheed EC-130H Compass Call
- Lockheed HC-130
- Lockheed Martin KC-130
- Lockheed LC-130
- Lockheed MC-130
- Lockheed RC-130 Hercules
- Lockheed WC-130
