= RMAF Kuantan Air Base =

Air force base in Kuantan, Pahang, Malaysia

RMAF Kuantan TUDM Kuantan
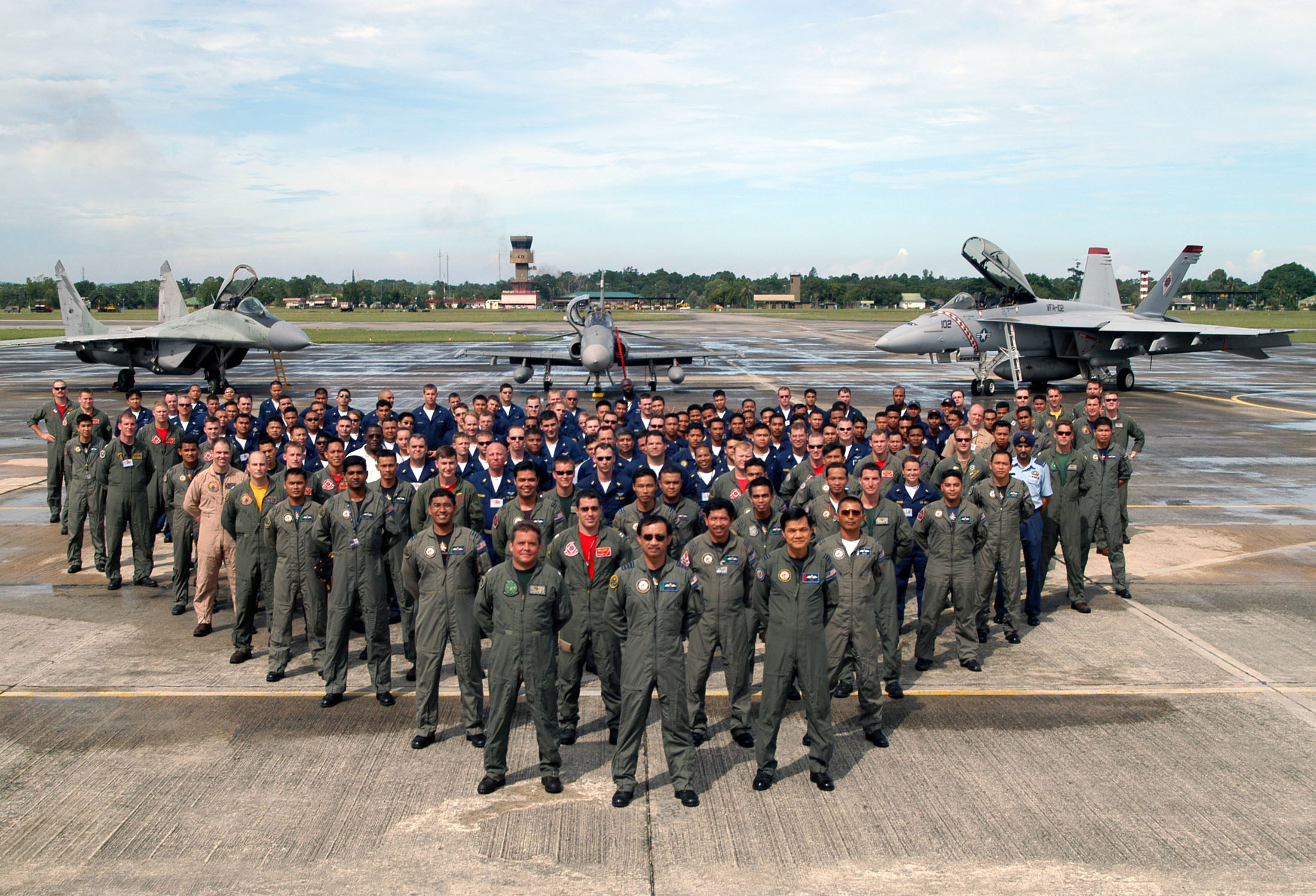
- A photo of RMAF and USN crewmembers at RMAF Kuantan during CARAT
- IATA: none; ICAO: WMKD

Summary
- Airport type: Military
- Owner: Royal Malaysian Air Force, Ministry of Defence
- Operator: Royal Malaysian Air Force
- Location: Kuantan, Pahang, Malaysia
- Time zone: MST (UTC+08:00)
- Elevation AMSL: 55 ft / 17 m
- Coordinates: 03°46′11″N 103°12′34″E

Map
- Location in Pahang RMAF Kuantan (Peninsular Malaysia) RMAF Kuantan (Malaysia)

Runways
Direction	Length		Surface
Direction	m	ft	Surface
18/36	2,804	9,199	Asphalt
- Sources: AIP Malaysia

RMAF Kuantan (Malay: TUDM Kuantan) is an airbase of the Royal Malaysian Air Force (Malay: Tentera Udara Diraja Malaysia). It is located in Kuantan, Pahang in Peninsular Malaysia. It shares the runway and other facilities with Sultan Haji Ahmad Shah Airport.

== History ==
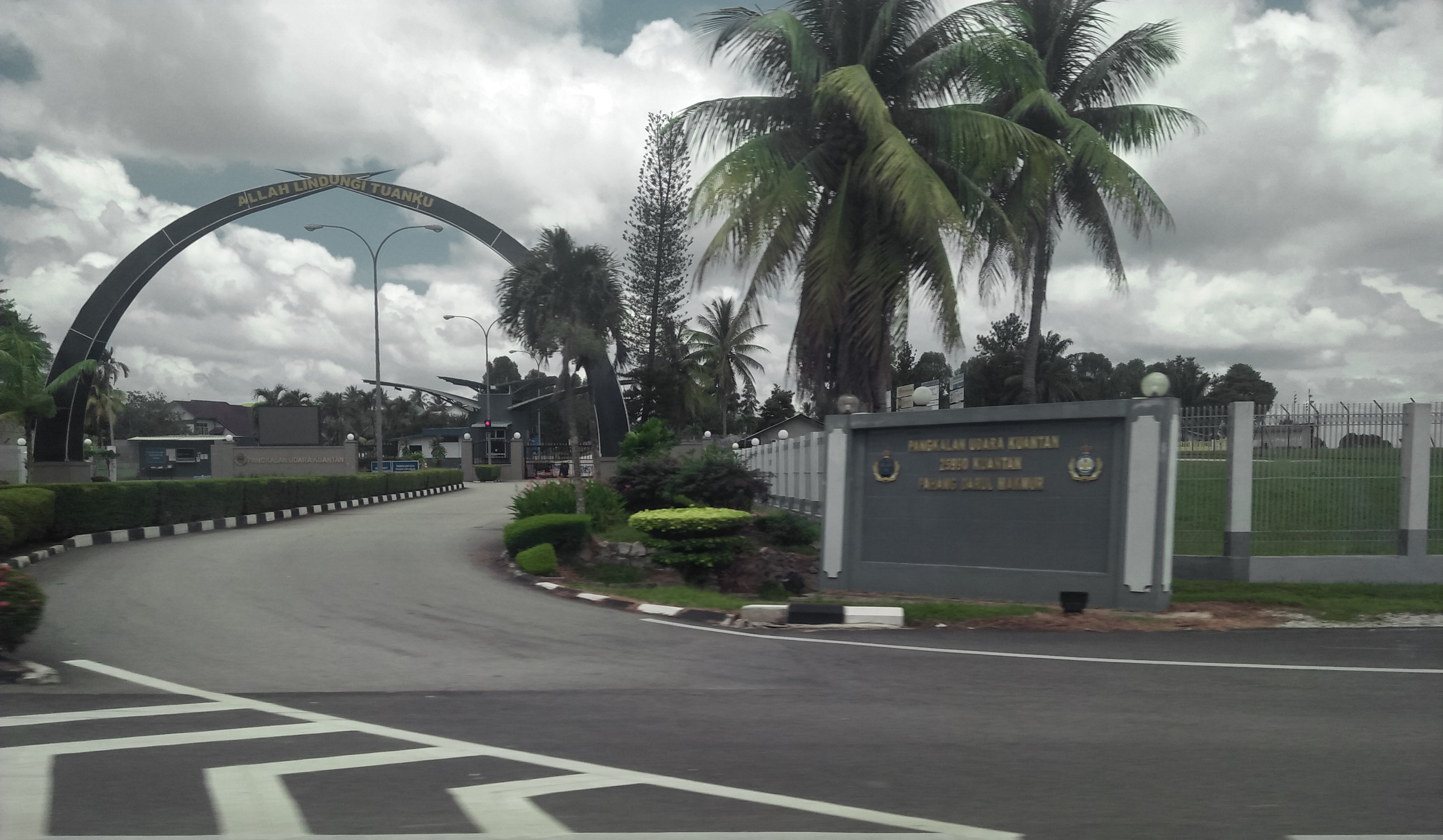
RMAF Kuantan air base entrance as seen from main road.

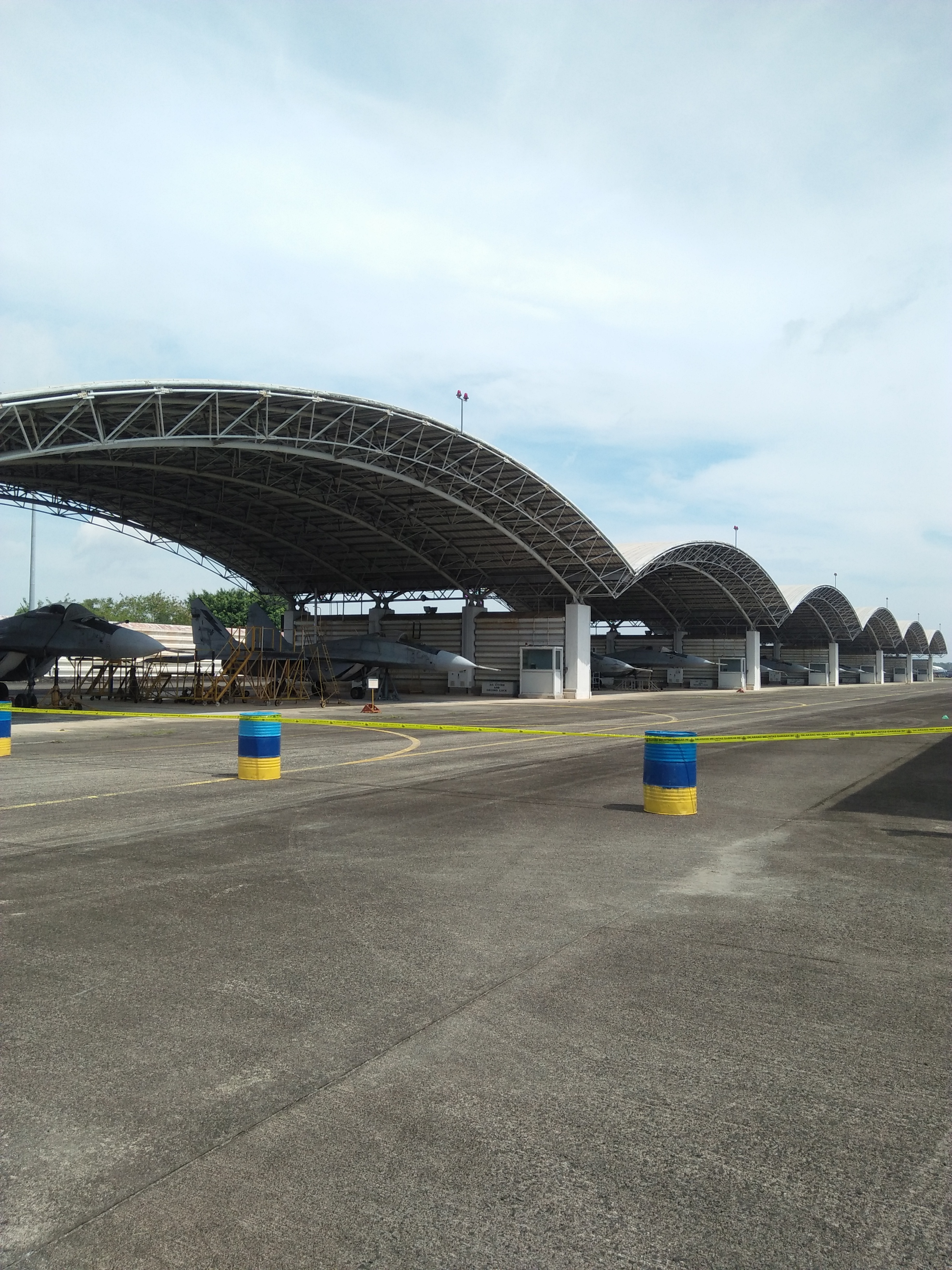
Mothballed Mikoyan MiG-29 of RMAF under shelter in RMAF Kuantan in 2022.

Kuantan began life as RAF Kuantan.

The following squadrons were here at some point:

- No. 32 Squadron RAF detachment between July 1961 and February 1969 with the English Electric Canberra B.15
- No. 36 Squadron RAF detachment between July 1935 and December 1941 with the Vickers Vildebeest III
- No. 45 Squadron RAF detachment between September 1962 and April 1965 with the Canberra B.15
- No. 60 Squadron RAF detachment between February and July 1941 with the Bristol Blenheim I
- No. 62 Squadron RAF detachment between February and December 1941 with the Blenheim I
- No. 100 Squadron RAF detachment between December 1941 and January 1942 with the Bristol Beaufort I

RMAF Kuantan was established on 24 June 1968. Its early squadrons consisted of No. 3 Squadron and No. 9 Squadron that flew Canadair CL-41G Tebuan jet trainers. In 1985 the CL-41G Tebuans were replaced by Douglas A-4 Skyhawks and BAE Systems Hawks. In 1995, the RMAF received Russian-made Mikoyan MiG-29s, which are based at Kuantan and operated by No. 17 Squadron and No. 19 Squadron. Other than being a base for fixed-wing aircraft, RMAF Kuantan is also a base for helicopters such as the Sikorsky SH-3 Sea King and Eurocopter EC725. The ATSC MiG Technical Centre, which is the company responsible for providing maintenance for the Mikoyan MiG-29s, is also located on the base.

== Squadrons assigned ==
=== Main squadron ===
Division	Squadrons	Aircraft assigned	Notes
1st Division	No. 17 Squadron	Mikoyan MiG-29	In reserve
1st Division	No. 19 Squadron	Mikoyan MiG-29	In reserve
1st Division	No. 10 Squadron	Eurocopter EC725	

=== Training squadron ===
Division	Squadrons	Aircraft assigned	Notes
Training Division	3 FTC	Aermacchi MB-339	

== See also ==
- Royal Malaysian Air Force bases
- List of airports in Malaysia
