= RMAF Kuching Air Base =

Air force base in Kuching, Sarawak, Malaysia

RMAF Kuching TUDM Kuching
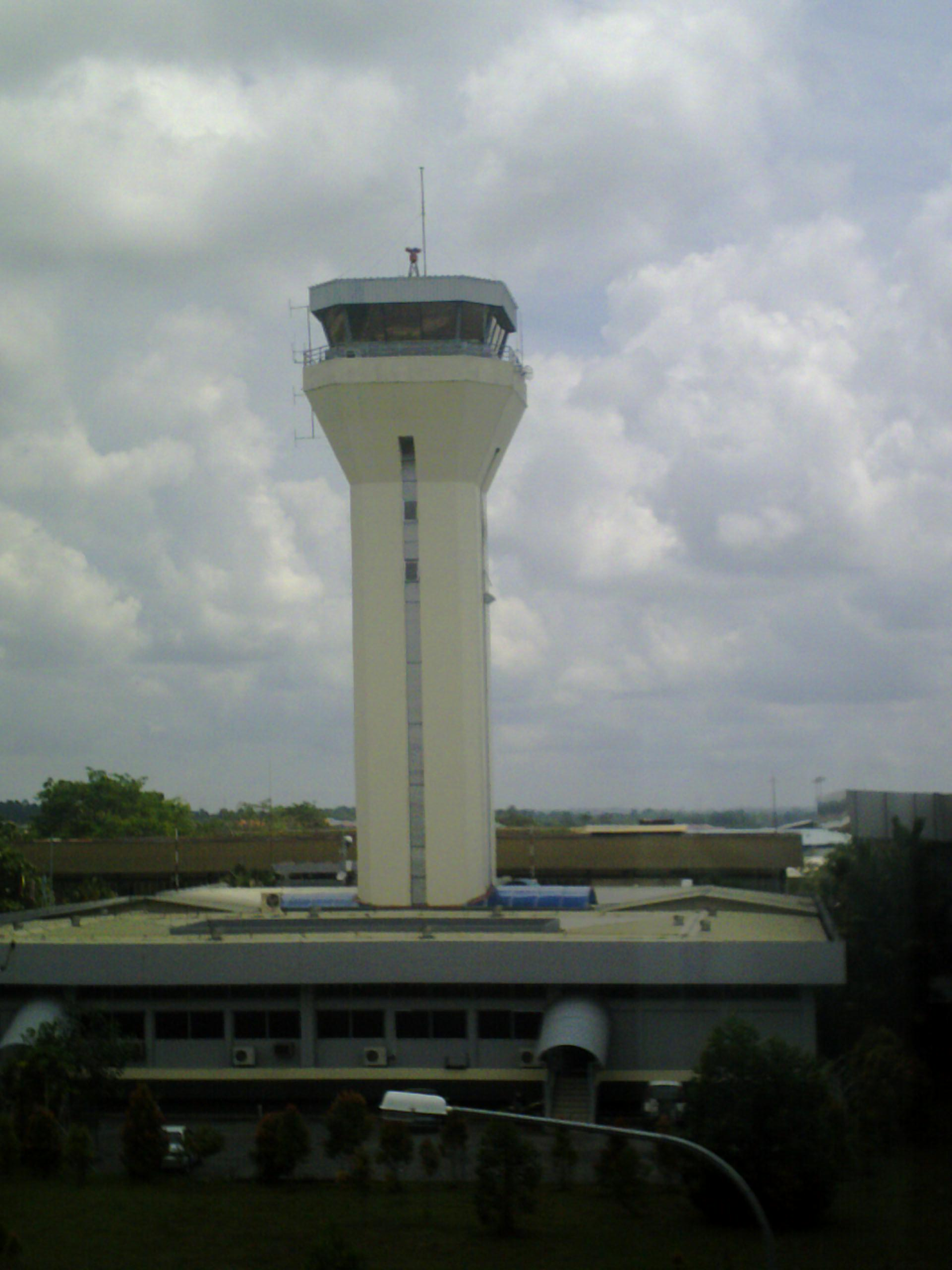
- IATA: none; ICAO: WBGG

Summary
- Airport type: Military
- Owner: Royal Malaysian Air Force, Ministry of Defence
- Operator: Royal Malaysian Air Force
- Location: Kuching, Sarawak, Malaysia
- Time zone: MST (UTC+08:00)
- Elevation AMSL: 89 ft / 27 m
- Coordinates: 01°29′13.5″N 110°20′30.9″E

Map
- Location in Sarawak RMAF Kuching (East Malaysia) RMAF Kuching (Malaysia)

Runways
Direction	Length		Surface
Direction	m	ft	Surface
7/25	3,780	12,402	Asphalt
- Sources: AIP Malaysia

RMAF Kuching (Malay: TUDM Kuching) is an air force base operated by the Royal Malaysian Air Force (Tentera Udara Diraja Malaysia). It is located in Kuching, Sarawak in East Malaysia and colocated with the Kuching International Airport.

== History ==
RMAF Kuching was established in 1964 by the Royal Air Force during the Indonesia–Malaysia confrontation to strengthen defense in Sarawak. RMAF formed a small detachment to assist RAF with the stationed of 20 personnel with one Twin Pioneer and four Aérospatiale Alouette III in August 1966. In 1967 RMAF Kuching was officially inaugurated after the RAF handed over the base to the RMAF following the withdrawal of the RAF elements in RMAF Kuching. Since then, RMAF Kuching have seen the significant development by the arrival of new aircraft such as DHC-4 Caribou and Sikorsky SH-3 Sea King and also the formation of new squadron.

== See also ==
- Royal Malaysian Air Force bases
- List of airports in Malaysia
