= Royal Malaysian Air Force =

Air warfare branch of Malaysia's military forces

- Tentera Udara Diraja Malaysia; تنترا اودارا دراج مليسيا
- Crest of the Royal Malaysian Air Force
- Founded: 2 June 1958; 68 years ago (founded as the Malayan Auxiliary Air force in 1936)
- Country: Malaysia
- Type: Air force
- Role: Aerial warfare
- Size: 15,000 personnel; 125 aircraft (see Equipment of the Royal Malaysian Air Force)
- Part of: Malaysian Armed Forces
- Mottos: Sentiasa di Angkasa Raya; (Always in the Sky)
- Colours: Sky Blue; Dark Blue; Yellow
- March: Perwira di Angkasa (Warriors in the Sky)
- Anniversaries: 2 June
- Engagements: Malayan Emergency; Sarawak Communist Insurgency; Indonesia–Malaysia Confrontation; Communist Insurgency in Malaysia; MALCON–UNIFIL; ISAF; MV Bunga Laurel Hijacking; Cross Border Attacks in Sabah; 2013 Lahad Datu Standoff; MT Orkim Harmony Hijacking
- Website: airforce.mil.my

Commanders
- Air Commodore-in-Chief: HRH Al-Sultan Abdullah of Pahang
- Chief of Air Force: General Dato' Sri Muhamad Norazlan bin Aris
- Deputy Chief of Air Force: Lieutenant General Dato' Nur Hafis bin Abdul Karim
- Regimental Sergeant Major of RMAF: Warrant Officer I Ahmad Maulana bin Ab Ghafar

Insignia
- Roundel

- Fin flash

- Ensign

Aircraft flown
- Fighter: Su-30MKM, F/A-18D Hornet, Hawk 208, FA-50M
- Helicopter: S-70A, EC 725, AW139, AW149
- Patrol: CN-235MSA, Super King Air
- Reconnaissance: Anka-S
- Trainer: Hawk 108, PC-7, Super King Air, H120
- Transport: A400M, C-130H, CN-235, A319CJ, A320-214CJ, BD-700
- Tanker: KC-130T

The Royal Malaysian Air Force (RMAF, Malay: Tentera Udara Diraja Malaysia; TUDM; Jawi: تنترا اودارا دراج مليسيا) was formed on 2 June 1958 as the Royal Federation of Malaya Air Force (Tentera Udara Diraja Persekutuan Tanah Melayu; تنترا اودارا دراج ڤرسكوتون تانه ملايو). However, its roots can be traced back to the Malayan Auxiliary Air Force formations of the British Royal Air Force in then-colonial British Malaya. The Royal Malaysian Air Force operates a mix of modern American, European and Russian-made aircraft.

== History ==
=== Early years ===
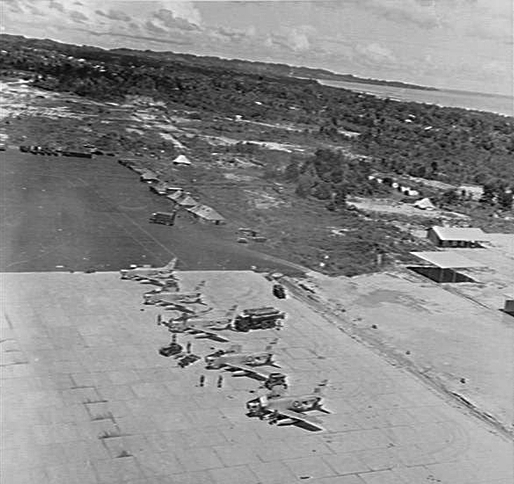
Labuan Air Base with CAC Sabre in 1965, today became the main airfield for East Malaysia.

The Malaysian air forces trace their lineage to the Malayan Auxiliary Air Force formations of the Royal Air Force (RAF) formed in 1934. They later transformed into the Straits Settlements Volunteer Air Force (SSVAF) and the Malayan Volunteers Air Force (MVAF) formed in 1940 and dissolved in 1942 during the height of the Japanese advance over Malaya. The latter was re-established in 1950 in time for the Malayan Emergency and contributed very much to the war effort.

On 2 June 1958 the MVAF finally became the Royal Federation of Malaya Air Force (RFMAF), this date is celebrated as RMAF Day yearly, the Royal title granted by Parliament in honor of its contributions to national defence during the Emergency and the transition to independent status.

On 25 October 1962, after the end of the Malayan Emergency, the RAF handed over their first airfields in Malaya to the RFMAF, at Simpang Airport; it was opened on 1 June 1941, in Sungai Besi, Kuala Lumpur which was formerly part of Selangor and the national capital city. The first aircraft for the fledgling air force was a Scottish Aviation Twin Pioneer named "Lang Rajawali" by the then Prime Minister Tunku Abdul Rahman. Several Malayans serving with the Royal Air Force transferred to the Royal Federation of Malaya Air Force. The role played by RMAF was limited initially to communications and the support of ground operations against Communist insurgents during the Malayan Emergency. RMAF received its first combat aircraft with the delivery of 20 Canadair CL41G Tebuans (an armed version of the Canadair Tutor trainer). RMAF also received Aérospatiale Alouette III helicopters, to be used in the liaison role.

With the formation of Malaysia on 16 September 1963, the name of the air force was changed to "Tentera Udara Diraja Malaysia" or "Royal Malaysian Air Force". New types introduced into service included the Handley Page Herald transport and the De Havilland Canada DHC-4 Caribou. RMAF received Sikorsky S-61A-4 helicopters in the late 1960s and early 1970s which were used in the transport role.

RMAF gained an air defence capability when the Australian Government donated 10 ex-Royal Australian Air Force (RAAF) CAC Sabre fighters. These were based at the Butterworth Air Base. After the withdrawal of British military forces from Malaysia and Singapore at the end of 1971, a Five Power Defence Arrangements (FPDA) agreement between Malaysia, Singapore, New Zealand, Australia, and the United Kingdom was concluded to ensure defence against external aggression. The RAAF maintained two Mirage IIIO squadrons at RAF/RAAF Station Butterworth, Butterworth Air Base as part of its commitment to the FPDA. These squadrons were withdrawn in 1986, although occasional deployments of RAAF aircraft continue.

=== Modernisation ===
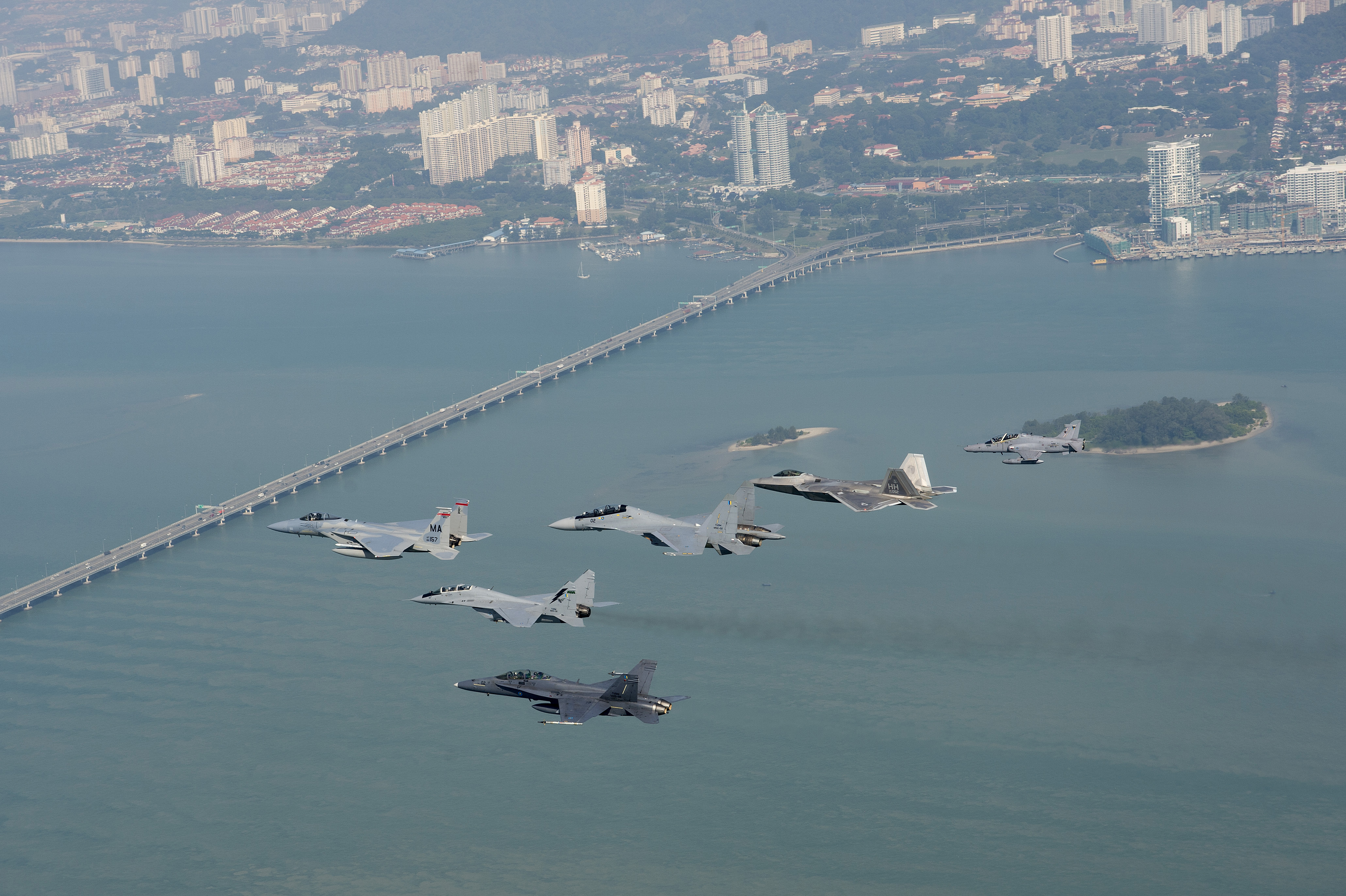
RMAF Sukhoi Su-30MKM, F/A-18 Hornet, MiG-29N and BAE Hawk 208 with USAF F-22 Raptor and F-15C Eagle participating in Cope Taufan 2014.

With the withdrawal of British military forces, RMAF underwent gradual modernisation from the 1970s to the 1990s. The Sabre were replaced by 16 Northrop F-5E Tiger-IIs. A reconnaissance capability was acquired with the purchase of two RF-5E Tigereye aircraft. RMAF also purchased 88 ex-US Navy Douglas A-4C Skyhawks, of which 40 of the airframes were converted/refurbished by Grumman Aircraft Engineering at Bethpage into the A-4PTM ('Peculiar To Malaysia'), configuration (similar to A-4M standard). RMAF has traditionally looked to the West for its purchases, primarily to the United States. However, limitations imposed by the US on "new technology" to the region, such as the AIM-120 AMRAAM fire-and-forget air-to-air missile, has made RMAF consider purchases from Russia and other non-traditional sources. The 1990s saw the arrival of first the BAE Hawk Mk108/208 which replaced the T/A-4PTMs, followed by the MiG-29N/NUB in 1995 in the air superiority role and delivery of the F/A-18D Hornet in 1997 to provide an all weather interdiction capability. In 2003 a contract was signed for 18 Su-30MKMs for delivery in 2007 to fulfill a requirement for an initial order of Multi-Role Combat Aircraft (MRCA). A requirement for a further 18 MRCAs remains unfulfilled. RMAF is also looking for an AWACS aircraft, although no firm orders have been placed.

On 8 December 2005, four Airbus Military A400M aircraft were ordered to enhance the airlift capability. By March 2017, all Malaysian A400Ms were delivered. In late 2006, the Government signed a contract to purchase eight Aermacchi MB-339CMs to add to the eight MB-339AMs already in service.

In March 2007, then-Deputy Prime Minister and Defence Minister Najib Razak notified the public that the MiG-29 would continue in service until 2010. Later that year, Najib announced the Sikorsky S-61A4 Nuri helicopter, in service since 1968 with 89 crew members killed in 15 accidents, would be phased out by 2012 and replaced by the Eurocopter EC725. Deputy RMAF Chief Lieutenant General Bashir Abu Bakar told the media after opening Heli-Asia 2007, that tender assessment for the replacement of the Sikorsky S-61A-4 Nuri would occur in early 2008. At the 12th Defence Services Asia (DSA) exhibition 2010, a Letter of Agreement (LOA) was signed for 12 EC725 helicopters to be supplied to the RMAF.

The RMAF has multiple ongoing procurement programs for combat, utility and maritime patrol aircraft.

== Ranks ==
Until the late 1970s, the Royal Malaysian Air Force used the same officer ranking system as the Royal Air Force. They were replaced by army-style designations and given Malay title equivalents, but the sleeve insignia remained the same mirroring the RAF practice, but all General Officers wear 1 to 5 stars on the shoulder board in addition to the existing sleeve insignia. The list of ranks which are currently used are shown below (in descending order). NCOs and enlisted ranks remained unchanged, and retain their pre-1970s names.

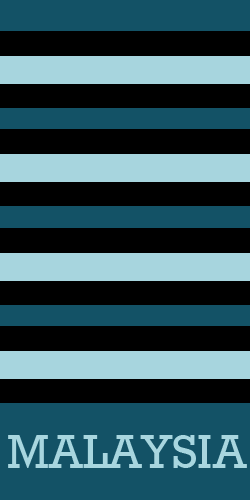
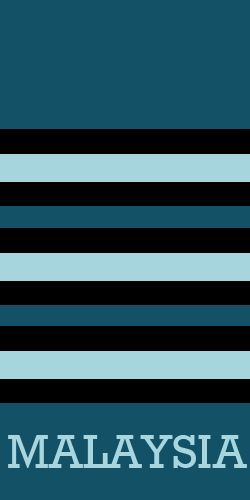
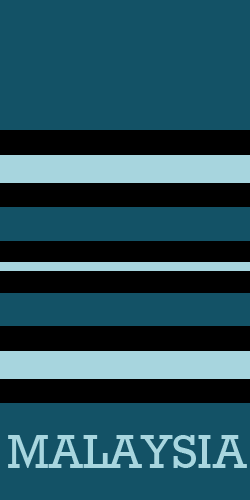
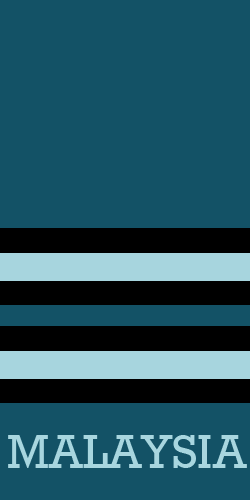
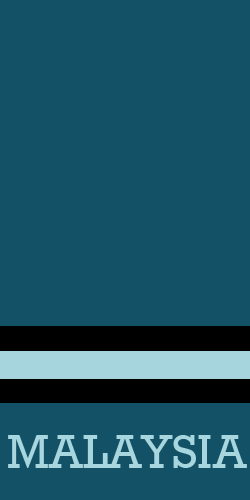
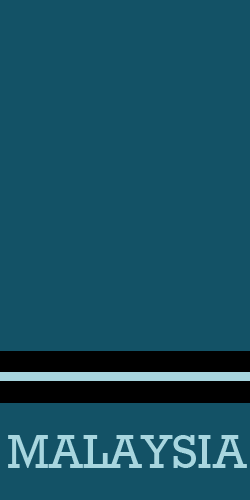
Rank group	General / flag officers					Senior officers			Junior officers
	Commander-in-Chief	Generals				Senior officers			Junior officers			Officer Cadets
	Pemerintah Tertinggi	Pegawai Tinggi				Pegawai Kanan			Pegawai Muda			Pegawai Kadet
Royal Malaysian Air Force
Royal Malaysian Air Force	Marsyal tentera udara	Jeneral TUDM	Leftenan jeneral TUDM	Mejar jeneral TUDM	Brigedier jeneral TUDM	Kolonel TUDM	Leftenan kolonel TUDM	Mejar TUDM	Kapten TUDM	Leftenan TUDM	Leftenan muda TUDM

All officers, with the exception of the Marshal of the Royal Malaysian Air Force apply the Air Force acronym (RMAF, TUDM) to their rank title, to differentiate from their Malaysian Army equivalents. For example, a Colonel in the Air Force would be titled Colonel, RMAF or Kolonel, TUDM in Malay.

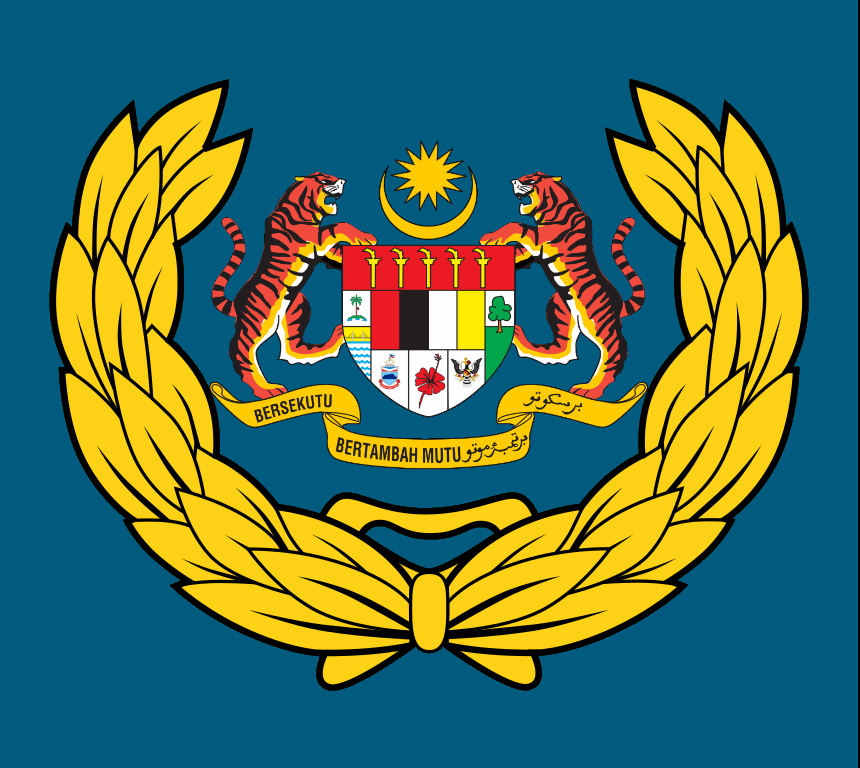
Rank group	Senior NCOs				Junior NCOs		Enlisted
	Warrant Officers		Senior Non-Commissioned Officers		Junior Non-Commissioned Officers		Others
	Pegawai Waran		Pegawai Tanpa Tauliah Kanan		Pegawai Tanpa Tauliah Rendah		Lain-lain
Royal Malaysian Air Force							No insignia	No insignia
Royal Malaysian Air Force	Pegawai waran udara I	Pegawai waran udara II	Flait sarjan	Sarjan udara	Koperal udara	Laskar udara kanan	Laskar udara I	Laskar udara II	Perajurit muda

== Ground and special forces ==
In addition to personnel assigned to aviation, airspace management, engineering, and logistics branches, the Royal Malaysian Air Force (RMAF) maintains dedicated ground and special forces to support its mission. The largest of these formations is the RMAF Regiment, which consists of at least three distinct units. There is also one ground unit that operates independently of the RMAF Regiment. Most personnel within these forces are recruited from the RMAF Administration branch trade (Malay: ketukangan cawangan tadbir).

=== RMAF Regiment ===
Established in 1980, the RMAF Regiment is the primary ground formation of the air force. Its headquarters is currently located at RMAF Jugra. The regiment is commanded by a one-star general holding the appointment of Commander of the RMAF Regiment (Malay: Panglima Rejimen TUDM). It currently comprises three distinct units, with personnel stationed across various airbases throughout Malaysia.

Historically, the formation was known as the RMAF Security Regiment (Malay: Rejimen Keselamatan TUDM), and its headquarters was designated as the RMAF Security Regiment Headquarters (Malay: Markas Rejimen Keselamatan TUDM), or MAREJ. The units under its command are detailed below:

==== RMAF Special Forces ====
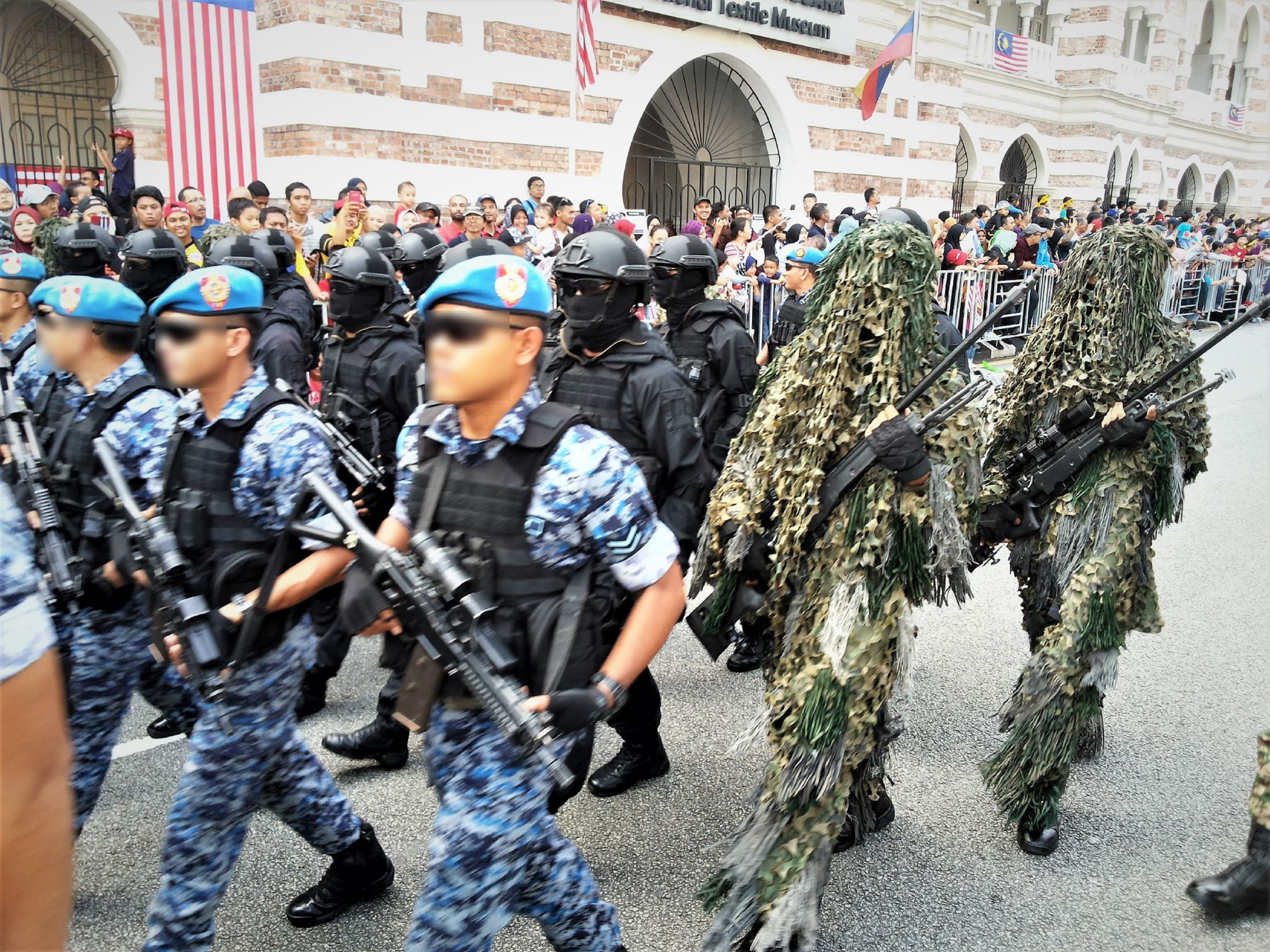
PASKAU detachments with dressed in the No.4 Digital Camouflage, tactical gear and ghillie suits parading during the 60th National Day Parade of Malaysia at Sultan Abdul Samad Street, Kuala Lumpur.

Commonly known as PASKAU (an acronym for Pasukan Khas TUDM), this is the special forces of the RMAF. Formerly known as the Pasukan Khas Udara (lit. 'RMAF Special Air Service'), it was formally established in 1996 by the merger of two special operations squadrons from the RMAF Air and Ground Defence Force. The unit adopted its current name in 2002.

PASKAU is tasked with combat search and rescue, responding to aircraft hijacking incidents, and protecting vital RMAF airbases. Other roles include air-to-ground target designation, sabotage of enemy assets, and RMAF aircraft defence. The unit is also trained for counter-terrorism, urban warfare, and close-quarters combat. PASKAU's structure and doctrines are influenced by the U.S. Air Force Special Operations Command, particularly units such as Combat Controllers, Pararescue Jumpers, and Tactical Air Control Party (TACP).

==== RMAF Ground Defence Force ====
The RMAF Ground Defence Force, originally the RMAF Air and Ground Defence Force, is the progenitor of all ground units within the RMAF. Its modern roles include light infantry, security operations, and airmobile (air assault/fly-away security) infantry.

The unit was established in 1980 following a communist mortar attack on RMAF Kuala Lumpur in 1974, with the aim of strengthening airbase security. In 1983, it was renamed the RMAF Provost after assuming military police duties from the Malaysian Army’s Royal Military Police Corps. At that time, its responsibilities spanned security, special operations, provost duties, and air defence. The unit was decommissioned in 1999, with its personnel divided amongst the Provost, Special Air Service, and Ground Base Air Defence.

Under the Capability Development 55 (CAP55) plan, the unit was reactivated in 2020 as the RMAF Ground Defence Force. Its air defence responsibilities were delegated to the RMAF Ground Base Air Defence. The force is influenced by the U.S. Air Force Security Forces and the British RAF Regiment.

==== RMAF Provost ====
The RMAF Provost is the military police unit responsible for maintaining discipline and military justice at RMAF bases. It has a direct lineage to the RMAF Air and Ground Defence Force. Following the reinstatement of the Ground Defence Force, the RMAF Provost now focuses primarily on provost duties, the management of detention depots, and legal investigations. Its personnel include military investigators and military police officers, many of whom are drawn from the RMAF Ground Defence Force.

=== RMAF Ground Base Air Defence ===
The RMAF Ground Base Air Defence is an artillery formation that uses anti-aircraft weapons to protect air bases, radar installations, and other vital assets. Established in 1995, it also traces its lineage to the original Air and Ground Defence Force. Unlike the units mentioned above, it is not part of the RMAF Regiment; instead, these units fall under the command of the specific RMAF bases where they are stationed.

== Aerobatic team ==
The Kris Sakti (English: Magic Dagger) is the aerobatic display team of the Royal Malaysian Air Force. It made its debut on Langkawi International Maritime and Aerospace Exhibition in December 2011. They operated four Extra 300L aircraft.

The Smokey Bandits is the aircraft aerobatic display team under the Royal Malaysian Air Force. This team operates five Mikoyan MiG-29 fighter aircraft and based in RMAF Kuantan. The team's name is taken from the smoke emissions from two Russian-made fighter aircraft engines when operating at full thrust. The team was first established in 2001. Unfortunately, along with the RMAF retires their MiG-29, this aerobatic display team is disbanded till now.

== Structure ==
As of November 2024 the structure is as follows:

Royal Malaysian Air Force
Commands
Name	Commander	Air Base
Air Operations Command	Lt. Gen. Datuk Mohd Shahada Ismail	Subang
Air Educations and Training Command	Lt. Gen. Dato' Nur Hafis Abdul Karim	Sendayan
Air Support Command	Lt. Gen. Dato’ Hj Mohammad Salleh Hj Osman	Subang
Air Region 1		Kuantan
Air Region 2		Labuan
RMAF Reserve Headquarters		Sendayan
Air Region 1
Name	Equipment	Air Base
No. 2 Squadron	Airbus A319CJ, Airbus A320-214CJ, Bombardier Global Express, Sikorsky S-70A-34 "White Hawk"	Subang
No. 3 Squadron (Motto: Dimana Dan Apa Saja)	Leonardo AW139	Butterworth
No. 8 Squadron	Airbus A400M Atlas	Subang
No. 10 Squadron	Eurocopter EC725	Kuantan
No. 11 Squadron	TAI Anka-S	Labuan
No. 12 Squadron (Motto: Berjuang Demi Kebebasan)	Sukhoi Su-30MKM Flanker-H	Gong Kedak
No. 15 Squadron		Butterworth
No. 16 Squadron	Beechcraft 200T	Subang
No. 17 Squadron		Butterworth
No. 18 Squadron (Motto: Menggempur Memintas)	Boeing F/A-18D Hornet	Butterworth
No. 20 Squadron	Lockheed C-130H Hercules, Lockheed KC-130T	Subang
No. 21 Squadron	CASA/IPTN CN235-220M, CASA/IPTN CN235-220M VIP	Subang
Air Region 2
Name	Equipment	Air Base
No. 1 Squadron	CASA/IPTN CN-235-220M	Kuching
No. 5 Squadron (Motto: Bersedia dan Pantas)	Eurocopter EC725	Labuan
No. 6 Squadron (Motto: Pantas Memusnah)	BAE Hawk 108/Hawk 208	Labuan
No. 7 Squadron (Motto: Cekal Berjuang)	Leonardo AW139, Leonardo AW149	Kuching
No. 14 Squadron	Lockheed C-130H Hercules	Labuan
Training Division
Name	Equipment	Air Base
No. 1 FTC	Pilatus PC-7 Mk II	Alor Setar
No. 2 FTC	Airbus Helicopters H120	Alor Setar
No. 3 FTC	KAI FA-50M	Kuantan

== Air bases ==
Air bases: Training bases: Other bases:
- TUDM Butterworth, Penang (RMAF Butterworth) (Base of F/A-18 Hornets)
- TUDM Kuantan, Pahang (RMAF Kuantan)
- TUDM Gong Kedak, Kelantan (RMAF Gong Kedak) (Base of Su-30MKMs)
- TUDM Labuan, Sabah (RMAF Labuan) (Base of BAE Hawks)
- TUDM Kuala Lumpur (RMAF Kuala Lumpur)
- TUDM Subang, Selangor (RMAF Subang)
- TUDM Kuching, Sarawak (RMAF Kuching)
- TUDM Alor Setar, Kedah (RMAF Alor Setar) (Air Force College)
- TUDM Ipoh, Perak (RMAF Ipoh) (Air Force School)
- TUDM Bukit Lunchu, Johor (RMAF Bukit Lunchu) (Control and Reporting Post)
- TUDM Kinrara, Selangor (RMAF Kinrara) (School of Logistic Management; formerly houses a central military hospital facility)
- TUDM Jugra, Selangor (RMAF Jugra) (RMAF Regiment headquarters)
- TUDM Bukit Ibam, Pahang (RMAF Bukit Ibam) (Combat Training School)
- TUDM Sendayan, Negeri Sembilan (RMAF Sendayan) (Military Administration Centre)

== Present development ==
While the RMAF has traditionally looked to the West for its purchases, primarily the United States and Europe, it has also recently looked to Russia and other non-traditional sources for its modernisation programs.

=== Multi-role combat aircraft ===
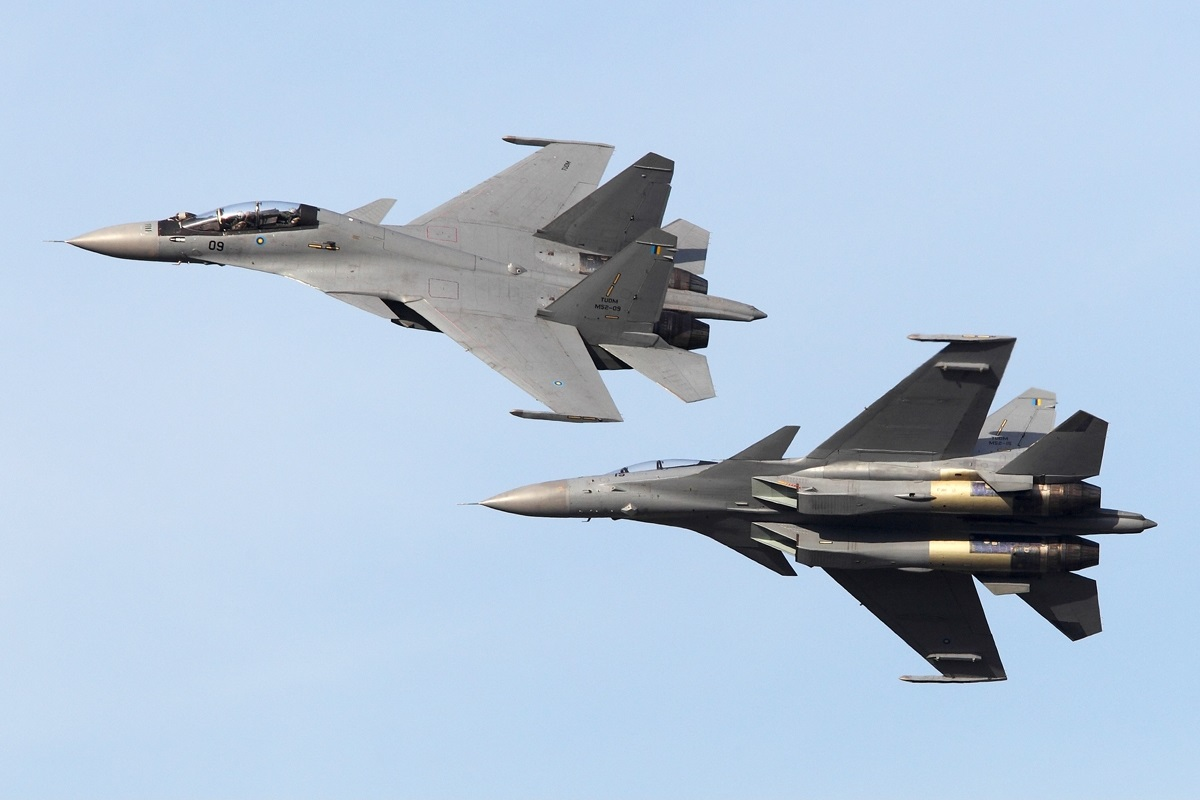
RMAF Sukhoi Su-30MKMs seen from top and bottom.

Faced with aging MiG-29 and F-5 aircraft, the RMAF began its Multi-Role Combat Aircraft (MRCA) acquisition program in 2011, with a planned entry of service date between 2015 and 2016. While it was initially reported that the RMAF was seeking to procure 18 aircraft, this number rose to 24 to 40 new aircraft in 2014 with a budget reported between $1.8 and $2.4 billion. According to then minister of defence Ahmad Zahid Hamidi, only Western manufactured aircraft were being considered. Four companies were shortlisted; Boeing, BAE Systems, Dassault Group, Saab AB, each offering their respective F/A-18 Super Hornet, Eurofighter Typhoon, Dassault Rafale, JAS 39 Gripen aircraft.

The program was put on hold indefinitely in 2014 as a result of budget restrictions and the forthcoming Eleventh Malaysia Plan, which covers government spending from 2016 to 2020. In response, Dassault offered a financial package consisting of a loan with a ten-year repayment plan guaranteed by the French government. This was countered by Saab, which offered a leasing deal, as did BAE Systems, which also offered to set up a local facility for maintenance and repair with possible financing by the British government. The Russian defence export corporation, Rosoboronexport, which previously supplied the Royal Malaysian Air Force with the Sukhoi Su-30MKM expressed its readiness to discuss the prospect of establishing joint licensed production facilities in Malaysia in 2016.

By 2016, the choice was narrowed down to either Dassault Rafale or Eurofighter Typhoon, with the former reportedly favoured by officials within the defence ministry. However, as a result of economic uncertainty as well as the rise of Islamist militancy in the region (see the Siege of Marawi in the neighbouring Philippines), immediate priority shifted from procuring new combat aircraft to increasing surveillance capability and the MRCA program was put on hold again with the a final decision only expected as late as 2020.

With economic difficulties hindering the completion of MRCA program, then deputy defence minister Ikmal Hisham announced that the government would seek to purchase the Kuwait Air Force's F/A-18C/D Hornet fleet, which it was phasing out in favour of newer aircraft in 2021. Pending US government approval, the defence ministry intends on acquiring as many as 30 aircraft. In June 2025, Air Force Chief-of-Staff General Asghar announced that the US had finally approved the sale of Kuwait's fleet of F/A-18C/D Hornet's to Malaysia, with deliveries expected to be completed by 2027 after the Kuwait Air Force has first brought their replacement fleet of Boeing F/A-18E/F Super Hornet up to full operational capability.

It was reported in August 2025 that the deal to acquire Kuwaiti Hornets was cancelled as Kuwait itself faced delays in procuring the Super Hornet, a deal which had been pending since 2017 and had been delayed by multiple factors, including the COVID-19 pandemic and US Navy's requirement of new Super Hornets taking priority over export orders. Furthermore, upon initial assessment of the Kuwaiti Hornets by RMAF personnel, it was realized that those aircraft had older software and radars than Malaysia's existing Hornets and had to be upgraded before being inducted into the Malaysian fleet which would cost US$4 million per aircraft and at least a year of work to bring them up to standard. Defence analysts in Malaysia pointed out that even when integrated into the Air Force, the Kuwaiti fleet would only have a few years before having to being retired with no real return on investment for upgrading the aircraft. Malaysia instead is now focusing on acquiring fifth generation combat aircraft as a long term solution to supplement its defense needs. The next day, RMAF chief General Muhamad Norazlan Aris dismissed the report and said that RMAF is still considering acquiring the Kuwaiti Hornets. A team of eight RMAF personnel was sent to the Ahmad al-Jaber Air Base on 11–26 November 2025 to evaluate the Kuwaiti aircraft. General Norazlan also personally inspected some of the Hornets. Malaysian government formally cancelled the Kuwaiti Hornets procurement on 6 February 2026. The plan was cancelled due to delays of the aircraft projected delivery and operational timeline, and uncertainty of their maintenance and support arrangements in the future.

=== Light combat aircraft ===
In 2018, the Light Combat Aircraft (LCA) program began with the aim of replacing the RMAF's Aermacchi MB-339 and BAE Systems Hawk fleet with 36 new aircraft as fighter-lead in trainers as well as light combat aircraft. Eight designs were submitted during the initial phase of the program, with the major contenders being the Alenia Aermacchi M-346 Master, HAL Tejas and KAI T-50 Golden Eagle, while the Aero L-39NG, Boeing T-7 Red Hawk, Hongdu L-15 Falcon, Yakovlev Yak-130 and CAC/PAC JF-17 Thunder were considered unlikely to be selected owing to their relatively new designs as well as the possibility of United States Office of Foreign Assets Control sanctions. The Saab Gripen was later added onto the RMAF's list of aircraft being considered, replacing the Boeing T-7 Red Hawk.

The program in its initial form was approved in 2019 with funding slated for 2021. It was renamed the Fighter-Lead In Trainer/Light Combat Aircraft (FLIT-LCA) program in the government's defence white paper in 2020 and launched as an open tender, a first for military aircraft procurement. Six designs were submitted, Alenia Aermacchi M-346 Master, HAL Tejas, KAI T-50 Golden Eagle, Hondu L-15 Falcon, Mikoyan MiG-35 and TAI Hürjet. The tender was eventually won by the KAI T-50 Golden Eagle in 2022 but challenged and reported to the Malaysian Anti-Corruption Commission, as the decision to award the tender was made by a caretaker government. The subsequent Malaysian government eventually placed an order for 18 'Block 20' variants, which feature an AESA radar, a Link 16 tactical data link, the capability for inflight refueling and a Sniper Advanced Targeting Pod in 2023 with a deal worth $920 million and the deliveries set to begin by October 2026 and lasting until June 2027. It is likely that another 18 KAI T-50 Golden Eagles will be ordered in 2027, which would bring the total up to 36 aircraft.

In March 2024, it was reported that six Royal Malaysian Air Force pilots would begin training in early 2026 on the FA-50 at a Republic of Korea Air Force airbase in Gwangju. On 30 October 2026, the first FA-50M Block 20 fighter jet landed at RMAF Labuan Air Base, after having flown from South Korea via the Philippines. In a press statement, Defence Minister Mohamed Khaled Nordin announced six more FA-50M aircraft would arrive by April 2027, with all 18 units scheduled for delivery in March 2028.

=== Maritime patrol aircraft ===
The RMAF expressed a need for increasing its maritime patrol capability with new aircraft as early as 2011, but budgetary constraints meant approval for new acquisitions wasn't given until 2017. Four designs were shortlisted to replace the RMAF's aging fleet of Beechcraft Super King Air, namely the Airbus C-295, Boeing P-8 Poseidon, ATR 72 and CASA/IPTN CN-235, which can be acquired from CASA (an Airbus subsidiary) or Indonesian Aerospace, with procurement to begin in 2021. It was reported as late as 2019 that the Japanese government had offered its surplus P-3C Orion aircraft but that it was unlikely the Malaysian government would accept.

In 2018, the Malaysian government signed a contract with Indonesian Aerospace to convert three of the RMAF's existing CN-235 transport planes into maritime patrol aircraft. In 2020, funding was secured from the United States' Maritime Security Initiative (MSI) and conversions began the same year, and all three aircraft were formally handed over in 2024.

In 2022, it was reported that the Malaysian government had finalised a tender and a contract worth $172 million for two ATR 72 MP was awarded to Leonardo, one of ATR's parent companies in 2023. The deal, described by the Malaysian defence minister as the first phase, will see deliveries begin in 2026.

=== Airborne early warning and control aircraft ===
In 2018, the RMAF announced its Capability Plan 2025 (CAP55), which details its plans up to 2025. It intends to operate a squadron of airborne early warning and control aircraft, which it currently does not possess. Saab had previously offered two Saab 340 AEW&C aircraft in a package deal with its Gripen fighters as part of the MRCA program in 2014. Saab has also previously signed Memorandums of Understanding (MoU) concerning airborne early warning and control systems with Malaysian company DRB-HICOM, which owns DefTech, a local defence contractor.

=== Medium-altitude long-endurance unmanned aerial vehicle ===
As a part of the modernization program, Malaysia also intends to acquire six MALE UAV. Malaysian government has issues a MALE UAV tender in 2020 and it is expected the procurement will take place in 2021. The major contenders of this project would be the General Atomics MQ-9 Reaper, TAI Anka, Bayraktar TB2, Safran Patroller, Thales Watchkeeper WK450, Kronshtadt Orion, CAIG Wing Loong and CASC Rainbow.

As of March 2022, it is reported the program is currently undergoing physical evaluation stage which has been shortlisted by the Procurement Board of the Ministry of Defence, and this process is still ongoing.

In October 2022, Malaysia's Defence Minister, Hishammudin Hussein announced that the TAI Anka had been selected for the procurement of three MALE-UAS units. According to Minister of Defence Mohamed Khaled Nordin, the Anka-S UAV is set to be received in February 2026. They would be based at RMAF Labuan Air Base on the northern part of Borneo to provide maritime surveillance over the South China Sea in general and Malaysia’s Exclusive Economic Zone specifically.

=== Utility helicopter ===
In 2007, Najib Razak announced that the Sikorsky S-61A4 Nuri helicopter in service since 1968 would be phased out by 2012 and replaced by the Eurocopter EC725. Deputy RMAF Chief Lieutenant General Bashir Abu Bakar told the media after opening Heli-Asia 2007 that tender assessment for the replacement of the Sikorsky S-61A-4 Nuri would occur in early 2008. At the 12th Defence Services Asia (DSA) exhibition 2010, a Letter of Agreement (LoA) was signed for 12 EC725 helicopters to be supplied to the RMAF. With that, EADS, (the European Aeronautical Defence and Space Company), pledged 100 million Euros to set up a comprehensive helicopter centre in Subang for an aeronautical academy, training, simulation and a maintenance, repair and overhaul facility for the Eurocopter EC725 military version and the Eurocopter EC225 civilian model.

Although there was a plan to replace all the Sikorsky S-61A-4 Nuri, due to budget constraints the government only managed to buy 12 Eurocopter EC725. For this reason, Nuri helicopters were still active in service until 2019. In LIMA 2019, Malaysia also expressed interest to buy Mil Mi-171 (modified armed version for Mil Mi-17) from Russia. It was reported on 7 January 2020 that the RMAF grounded its Nuri helicopters and RMAF General Ackbal Abdul Samad remarked that there was an evaluation of a new utility helicopter to replace all the remaining Nuri.

In 2021, four AgustaWestland AW139 were leased from a Malaysian aviation company, Weststar Aviation, as temporary replacement before the eventual procurement of new 24 helicopters to replace the S-61A4 Nuri. Another four units were leased on 2025 bring the total of eight aircraft.

=== Ground-based radar ===
In 2019, it is confirmed that RMAF sought for three new ground-based radar. The major contenders of this project would be the Thales Ground Master 400, Selex RAT-31, Giraffe radar and Lockheed Martin TPS-77 MMR.

In 2021, it is reported the US Department of Defense has 'gifted' an export version of Lockheed Martin TPS-77 MMR to Malaysia in order to provide secure interoperable C3I (Command Control Communications and Intelligence) and sensor systems supporting U.S. Joint Air Operations to US Government FMS (Foreign Military Sales) customers. Through LIMA 2023, Malaysia has awarded Thales for the procurement of one unit Ground Master 400 radar for the RMAF. In LIMA 2025, Malaysia has awarded Thales for another two Ground Master 400 radar.

=== Medium-range air defence ===
In 2021, it was confirmed that RMAF sought for a regiment of medium-range air defence system to improve the national air defence capabilities. The contenders for the program are still unknown.

In 2014, a Malaysian private company signed a Memorandum of Understanding (MoU) with a Chinese defence firm to acquire Chinese LY-80 medium range air defence missile, but the government of Malaysia did not endorse it.

== Incidents and accidents ==
- Since 1989, around 95 armed forces personnel (most of those are the RMAF) have been killed in 18 crashes involving the ageing type American-made Sikorsky S-61A4 Nuri helicopter. This led the RMAF to purchase the French-made EC725 helicopter to replace it. But with the nation having ordered only 12 of a planned 28 EC725 helicopters as replacements, the RMAF was forced to prolong the life of its Sikorskys. On October 21, 2016, it was reported that a Canadian helicopter company Heli-One will upgrade all Malaysia's Nuri helicopter.
- On 2 September 1998, a Mikoyan MiG-29 suffered a hydraulic failure during a flight and a battery failure when it was returning to base. The aircraft crashed into a forested area and the pilot survived. Subsequent checks on all MiG-29 engines showed that they did not meet manufacturer specifications.
- On 9 November 2004, a Mikoyan MiG-29 crashed into an oil palm plantation in Kemaman, Terengganu. The pilot survived the crash.
- In May 2008, two J85-GE-21 engines that power the Northrop F-5E Tiger II fighter jets belonging to the Royal Malaysian Air Force were reported missing, as of sometime in 2007, from an RMAF warehouse in Kuala Lumpur during Najib's tenure as Defence Minister in Abdullah Ahmad Badawi's cabinet. The jet engines belonged to the 12th Squadron (Scorpion) based in Butterworth. The issue became a matter of political dispute and it was reported a brigadier-general together with 40 other armed forces personnel had been sacked over the incident. Further investigation led to the arrest of two RMAF personnel and a civilian contractor were charged in connection with the theft and disposal of both engines on 6 January 2010. On February 5, 2010, Attorney-General Abdul Gani Patail revealed that the two missing engines had been found in Uruguay with the help of the Government of Uruguay and the Malaysian government is proceeding with the necessary measures to secure their return. Investigations showed that the engines were taken out of the RMAF base between 20 December 2007 to 1 January 2008 before being sent to a warehouse in Subang Jaya to be shipped out of Malaysia to South America.
- On 25 March 2010, a Pilatus PC-7 Mark II from the Air Force College, RMAF Kepala Batas crashed into a forest reserve near the sports complex in Universiti Utara Malaysia, Sintok approximately during 10:15 a.m. The pilot, Major Muhammed Zulrihan Jusofin was killed in the crash during a flypast in conjunction of the 23rd Convocation Festival held in Universiti Utara Malaysia.
- On 26 February 2016, an engine failure caused a CN-235-220 to make an emergency landing in a mangrove swamp near Kuala Selangor. The co-pilot sustained a broken left arm during the incident while the rest of the crew managed to escape without any major injuries. A fisherman who were trying to help the crews out of the aircraft were reported drowned after his foot got stuck in the mud. The black box from the aircraft was eventually found on the next day and was sent to Bandung, Indonesia for it to be analyzed by the Indonesian manufacturer over the cause of the accident.
- On 17 May 2016, an Aermacchi MB-339 crashed into a paddy field near Nenasi, Pahang during a training mission. Both crew members managed to eject from the aircraft, with one suffering a broken leg.
- On 21 December 2016, a Beechcraft King Air 200T crashed into Butterworth airbase during a training mission, killing one pilot and leaving three others injured.
- On 14 June 2017, two pilots were killed after a BAE Hawk 108 crashed at the Pahang - Terengganu border. Previously, several other Hawks had crashed during training missions.
- On 16 November 2021, at around 10:07pm, a British-made BAE Hawk 108 (M40-08) crashed on the runway of Butterworth airbase, killing one of the pilots.
- On 6 May 2025, the front landing gear of a BAE Hawk 208 (M40-26) collapsed as it touched down on the runway, landing on its nose in Alor Setar, Kedah. The aircraft had been participating in a training exercise ahead of the opening ceremony for the Langkawi International Maritime and Aerospace Exhibition 2025.
- On 23 June 2025, a CN-235-220's nose landing gear collapsed on the runway at Kuching International Airport around 11:30 am. The airport was closed from 11:00 am to 3:00 pm.
- On 21 August 2025, the engines of an F/A-18D (M45-07) caught fire soon after taking off from the runway of the RMAF Kuantan Air Base, resulting in the crash of the aircraft. The incident occurred at 9:05 p.m. local time. Both the pilot and weapons system officer ejected safely with minor injuries. An investigation was conducted and the crash was caused by a bird strike.

== See also ==
- Malaysian Armed Forces
  - Malaysian Army
  - Royal Malaysian Navy
- Malaysia Coast Guard
- Royal Malaysia Police
- Royal Johor Military Force
- Joint Forces Command
