= RMAF Labuan Air Base =

RMAF Labuan TUDM Labuan
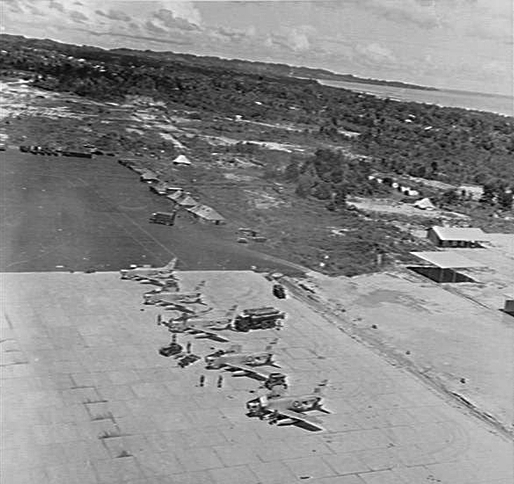
- RMAF Labuan with CAC Sabre in 1965
- IATA: none; ICAO: WBKL

Summary
- Airport type: Military
- Owner: Royal Malaysian Air Force, Ministry of Defence
- Operator: Royal Malaysian Air Force
- Location: Labuan, Malaysia
- Time zone: MST (UTC+08:00)
- Elevation AMSL: 101 ft / 31 m
- Coordinates: 05°18′06″N 115°14′54″E

Map
- Location in East Malaysia

Runways
Direction	Length		Surface
Direction	m	ft	Surface
14/32	2,745	9,006	Asphalt
- Sources: AIP Malaysia

RMAF Labuan (Malay: TUDM Labuan) is an air force base operated by the Royal Malaysian Air Force (Malay: Tentera Udara Diraja Malaysia). It is located in the Federal Territory of Labuan in East Malaysia. It is collocated with the Labuan Airport.

== History ==
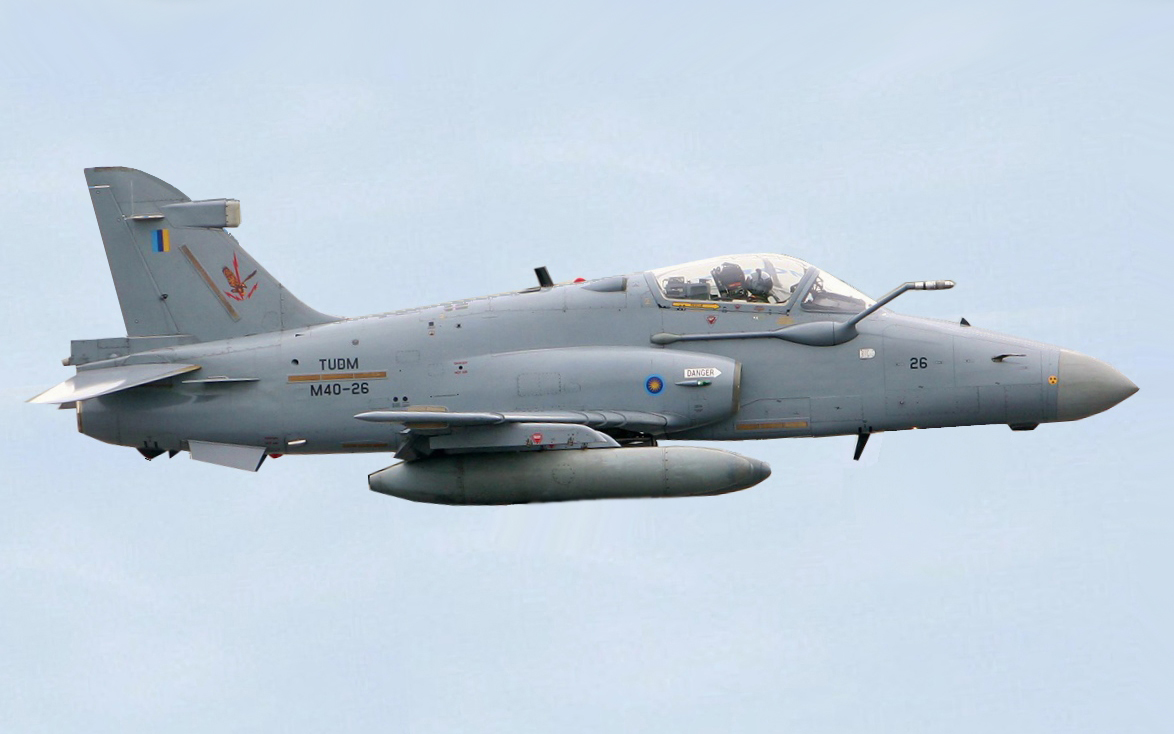
BAE Hawk 208 that was stationed at RMAF Labuan

RMAF Labuan started with the deployment of one detachment of the Royal Air Force, under the command of Group Captain S.J. Rawling. After the formation of Malaysia on 16 September 1963, some personnel were deployed to this airbase under the Air Force Borneo. At that early time, RMAF Labuan owned some Twin Pioneer aircraft for logistic and patrol role. The Indonesia–Malaysia confrontation in 1963 aroused the demand for this airbase to be upgraded as a main airbase for Malaysia. From 1965, RMAF Labuan saw a significant upgrade with the formation of the main administration branch, the expansion of the existing detachment, the formation of a new squadron and the commissioning of new aircraft. In 1966, RMAF Labuan received its first batch of DHC-4 Caribou to strengthen the No 8 Squadron that already operated Twin Pioneer transport aircraft. The No 5 Squadron that formed in Kuala Lumpur also moved to the RMAF Labuan with their Aérospatiale Alouette III helicopters to provide a rotorcraft element. RMAF Labuan was inaugurated by the defence minister at the time, in 1968. Nowadays, RMAF Labuan is an important airbase for the RMAF as it grants direct access to the South China Sea and protects Borneo's East Malaysia. RMAF Labuan is now the base of the RMAF's BAE Hawk 108 and BAE Hawk 208.

== Squadron assigned ==
=== Main squadron ===
Division	Squadrons	Aircraft assigned	Notes
2nd Division	No. 5 Squadron	Eurocopter EC-725	
2nd Division	No. 6 Squadron	BAE Hawk 108/BAE Hawk 208	
2nd Division	No. 14 Squadron	Lockheed C-130H Hercules	

== See also ==
- Royal Malaysian Air Force bases
- List of airports in Malaysia
