= RMAF Subang Air Base =

Military airport in Subang, Selangor, Malaysia

RMAF Subang TUDM Subang
- The PASKAU commandos providing security coverage for the USAF C-17 Globemaster III transport aircraft during the Thunderbirds 2009 air show at RMAF Subang.
- IATA: none; ICAO: WMSA

Summary
- Airport type: Military
- Owner: Ministry of Defence
- Operator: Royal Malaysian Air Force
- Serves: Greater Kuala Lumpur
- Location: Shah Alam, Petaling District, Selangor, Malaysia
- Opened: 1985; 41 years ago
- Occupants: 8th Squadron A400M RMAF
- Time zone: MST (UTC+08:00)
- Coordinates: 03°07′52″N 101°32′53″E

Map
- Location in West Malaysia

Runways
Direction	Length		Surface
Direction	m	ft	Surface
			Asphalt

RMAF Subang (ICAO: WMSA) is a military airport operated by the Royal Malaysian Air Force (Malay: Tentera Udara Diraja Malaysia). It is located on the edge of Shah Alam, a town in Selangor in Peninsular Malaysia and shares runway facilities with the Sultan Abdul Aziz Shah Airport.

== History ==
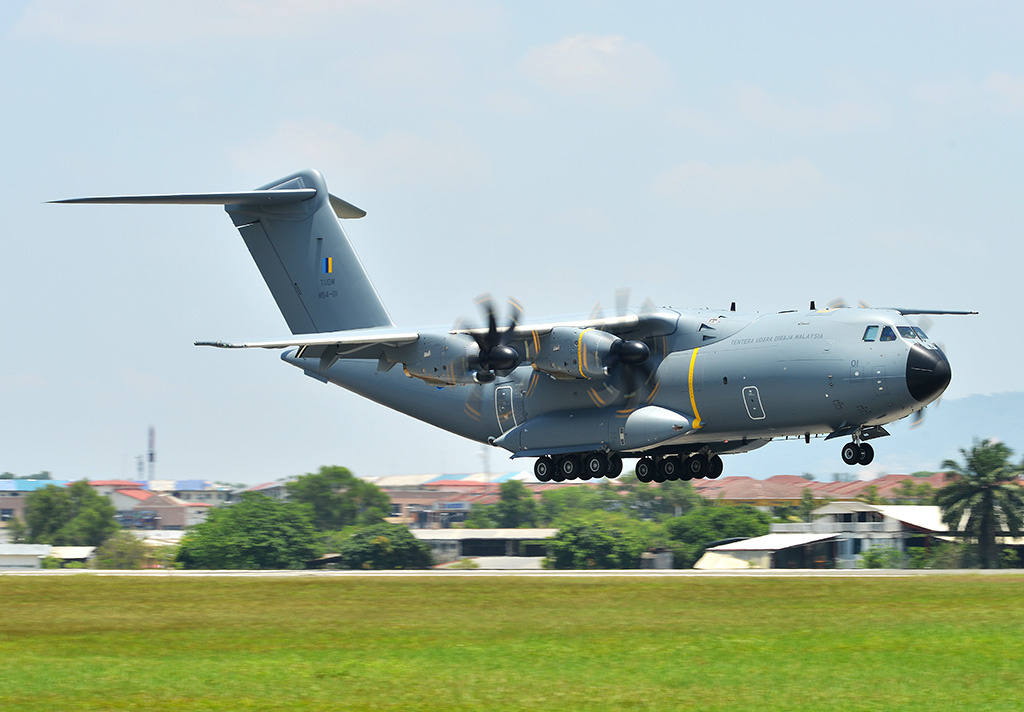
A400M at RMAF Subang.

RMAF Subang officially established in 1985. The original purpose of the establishment of this airbase was mainly for tactical airlift and maritime operation. RMAF's aircraft that operates from this airbase including airlifter such as Airbus A400M Atlas, Lockheed C-130 Hercules and CASA/IPTN CN-235. This airbase also operates RMAF's VIP aircraft such as Airbus A319CJ, Airbus A320-214CJ, Bombardier Global Express and rotorcraft Sikorsky S-70A-34 "Whitehawk". Due to its purpose for maritime operation, RMAF also stationed Beechcraft Super King Air maritime patrol aircraft in this airbase.

== See also ==
- Sultan Abdul Aziz Shah Airport, the civilian airport sharing runway facilities with the Air Base
- Royal Malaysian Air Force bases
- List of airports in Malaysia
