= 1936 =

Calendar year

1936 in various calendars
- Gregorian calendar: 1936; MCMXXXVI
- Ab urbe condita: 2689
- Armenian calendar: 1385; ԹՎ ՌՅՁԵ
- Assyrian calendar: 6686
- Baháʼí calendar: 92–93
- Balinese saka calendar: 1857–1858
- Bengali calendar: 1342–1343
- Berber calendar: 2886
- British Regnal year: 26 Geo. 5 – 1 Edw. 8 – 1 Geo. 6
- Buddhist calendar: 2480
- Burmese calendar: 1298
- Byzantine calendar: 7444–7445
- Chinese calendar: 乙亥年 (Wood Pig); 4633 or 4426 — to — 丙子年 (Fire Rat); 4634 or 4427
- Coptic calendar: 1652–1653
- Discordian calendar: 3102
- Ethiopian calendar: 1928–1929
- Hebrew calendar: 5696–5697
- Hindu calendars
- Vikram Samvat: 1992–1993
- Shaka Samvat: 1857–1858
- Kali Yuga: 5036–5037
- Holocene calendar: 11936
- Igbo calendar: 936–937
- Iranian calendar: 1314–1315
- Islamic calendar: 1354–1355
- Japanese calendar: Shōwa 11 (昭和１１年)
- Javanese calendar: 1866–1867
- Juche calendar: 25
- Julian calendar: Gregorian minus 13 days
- Korean calendar: 4269
- Minguo calendar: ROC 25 民國25年
- Nanakshahi calendar: 468
- Thai solar calendar: 2478–2479
- Tibetan calendar: ཤིང་མོ་ཕག་ལོ་ (female Wood-Boar); 2062 or 1681 or 909 — to — མེ་ཕོ་བྱི་བ་ལོ་ (male Fire-Rat); 2063 or 1682 or 910

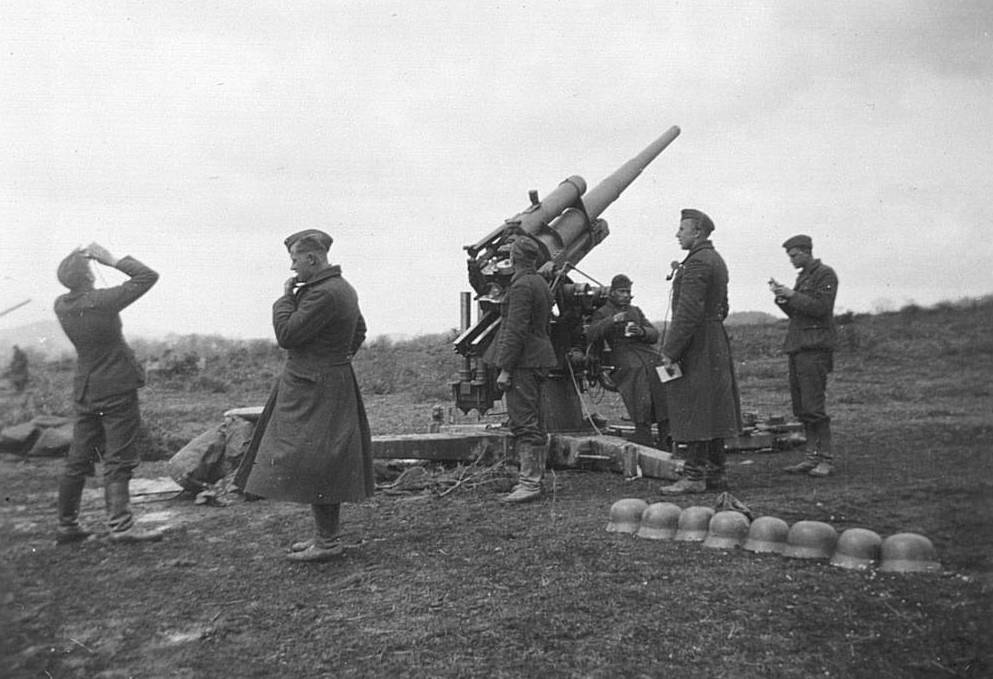
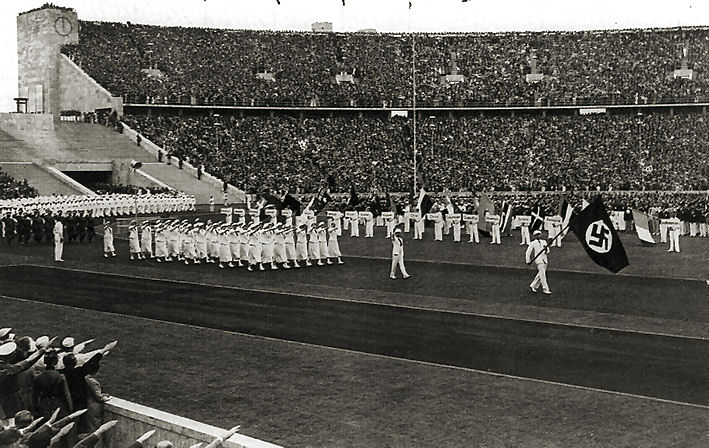
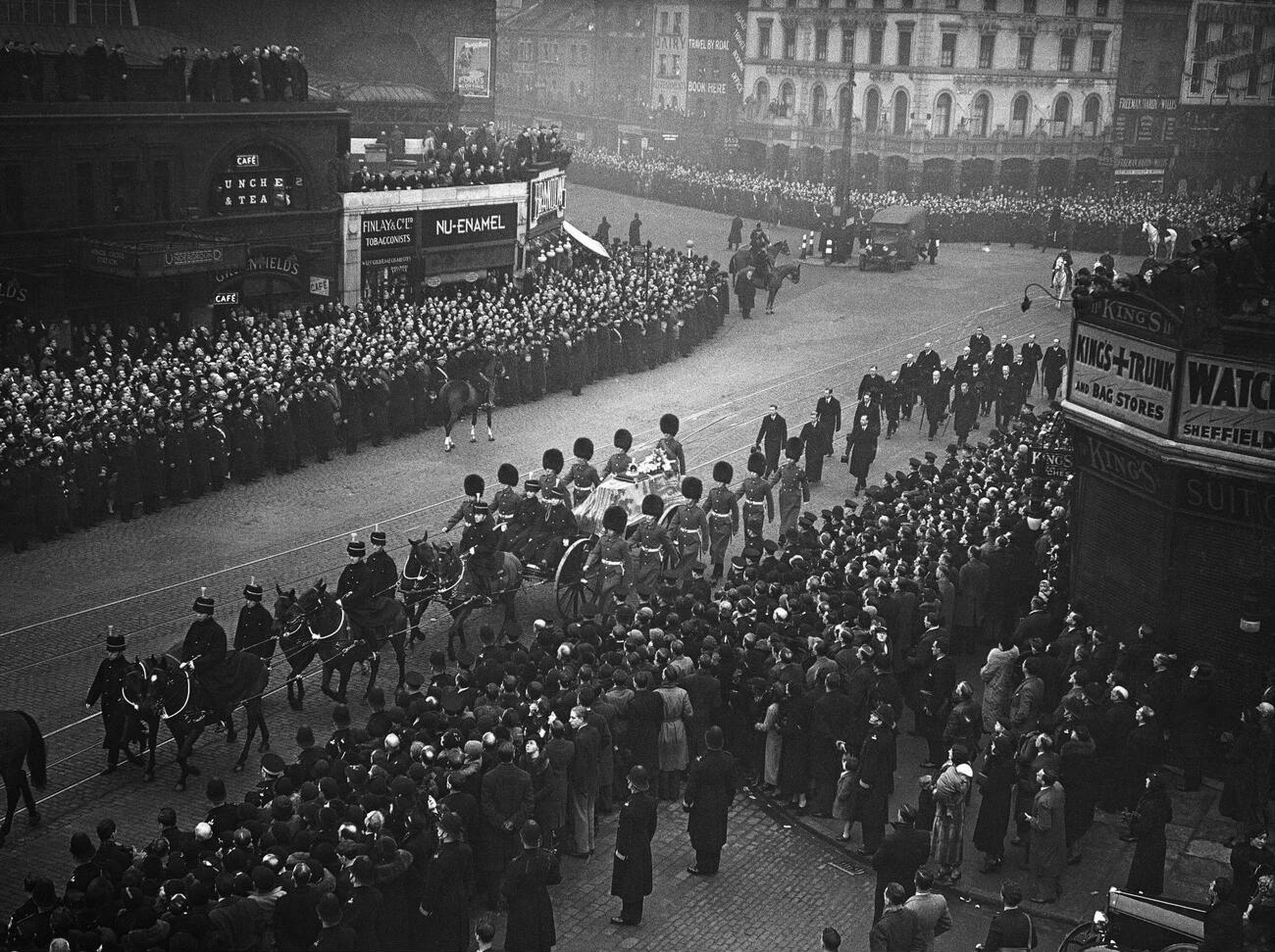
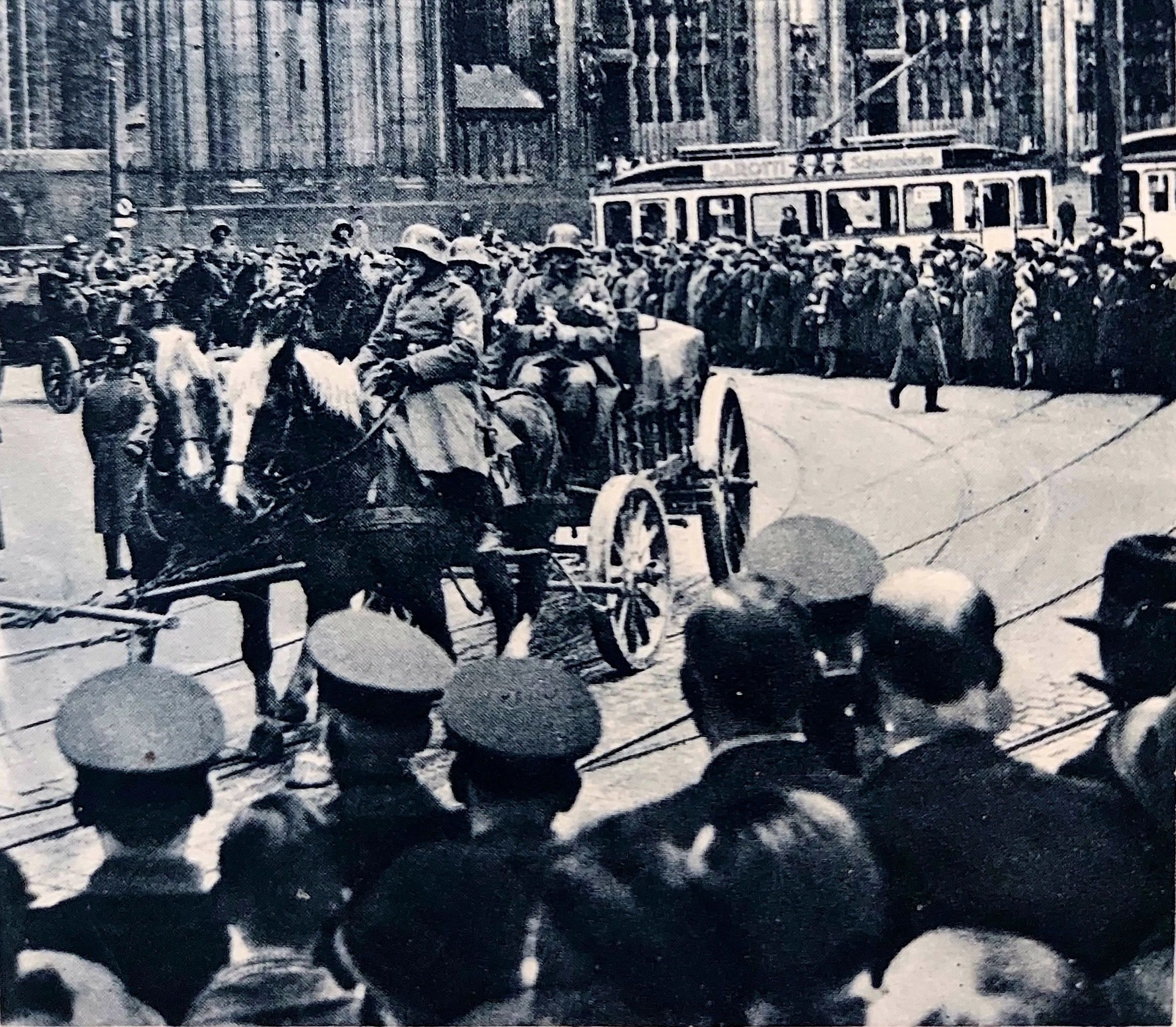
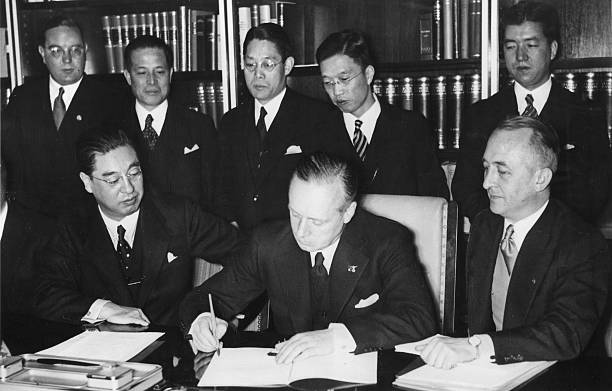
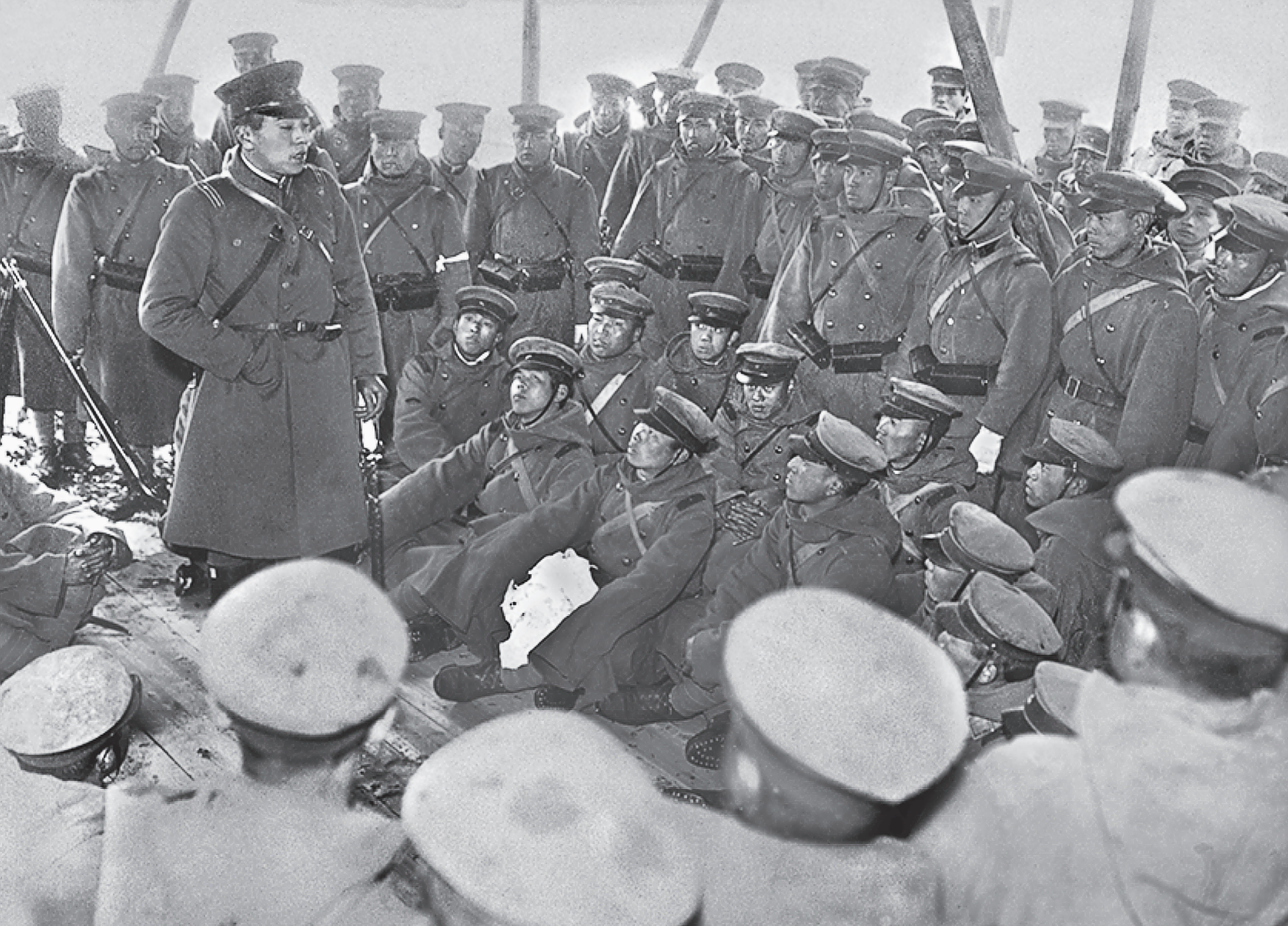
From top to bottom, left to right:
- The Spanish Civil War begins as Franco’s Nationalists rise against the Republicans;
- At the 1936 Summer Olympics, Jesse Owens wins four gold medals, defying Nazi racial ideology;
- The death and state funeral of George V shocks Britain, followed by the Abdication of Edward VIII;
- The Remilitarisation of the Rhineland violates the Treaty of Versailles, emboldening Hitler;
- The Anti-Comintern Pact is signed by Germany and Japan against the Soviet Union;
- The February 26 incident, a failed coup attempt in Japan, leads to political purges.

1936 (MCMXXXVI) was a leap year starting on Wednesday of the Gregorian calendar, the 1936th year of the Common Era (CE) and Anno Domini (AD) designations, the 936th year of the 2nd millennium, the 36th year of the 20th century, and the 7th year of the 1930s decade.

== Events ==
=== January–February ===
- January 8 – Reza Shah of Iran issues the Kashf-e hijab which bans all Islamic Veils such as the Hijab, in addition to many types of male traditional clothing
- January 20 – The Prince of Wales succeeds to the throne of the United Kingdom as King Edward VIII, following the death of his father, George V, at Sandringham House.
- January 28 – State funeral of George V of the United Kingdom. After a procession through London, he is buried at St George's Chapel, Windsor Castle.
- February 4 – Radium E (bismuth-210) becomes the first radioactive element to be made synthetically.
- February 5 – Modern Times, widely considered one of the greatest films ever, premieres in New York City.
- February 6 – The IV Olympic Winter Games open in Garmisch-Partenkirchen, Germany.
- February 10–19 – Second Italo-Ethiopian War: Battle of Amba Aradam – Italian forces gain a decisive tactical victory, effectively neutralizing the army of the Ethiopian Empire.
- February 16 – 1936 Spanish general election: The left-wing Popular Front coalition takes a majority.
- February 26 – February 26 Incident (二・二六事件, Niniroku Jiken): The Imperial Way Faction engineers a failed coup against the Japanese government; some politicians are killed.

=== March–April ===
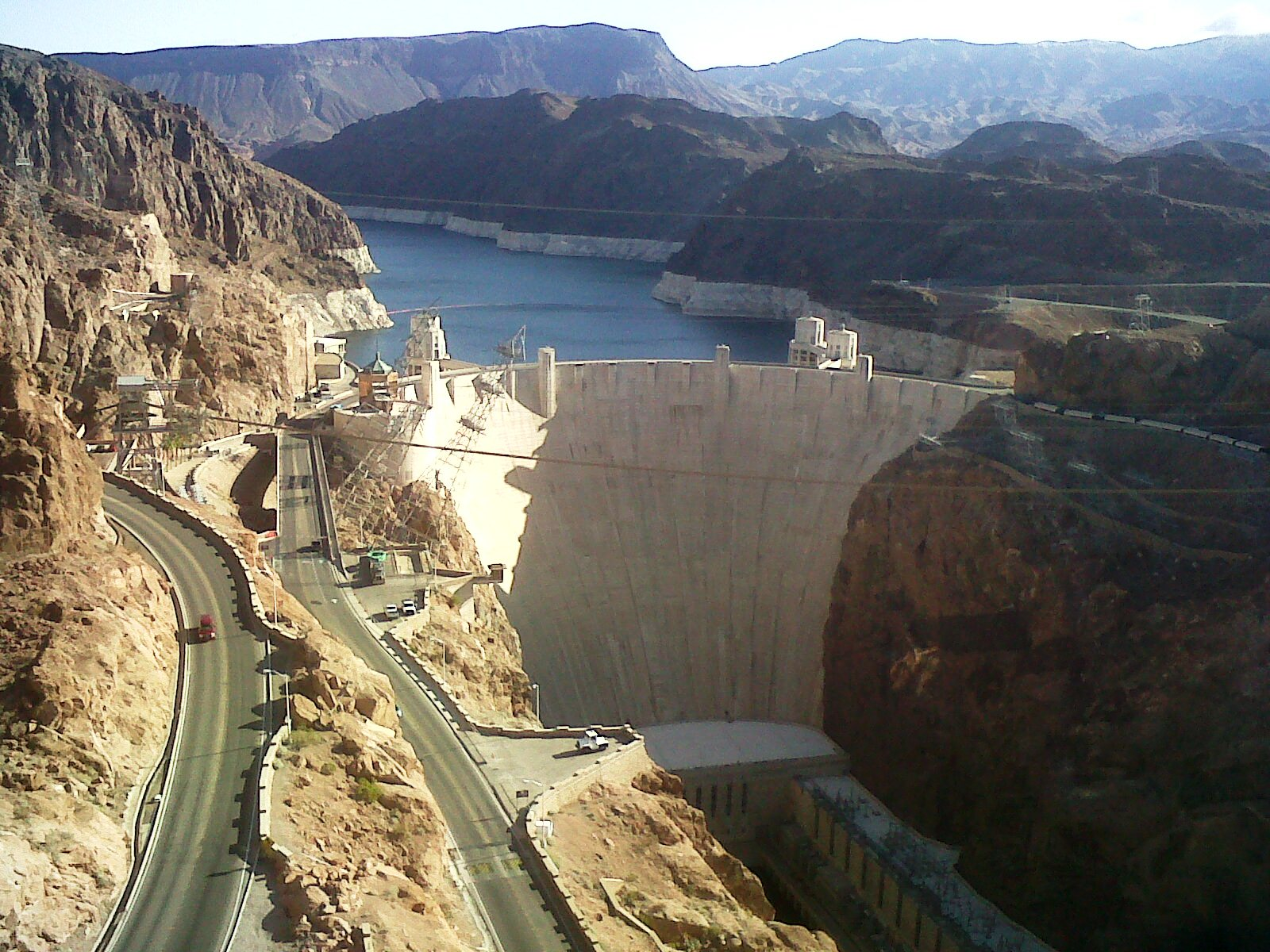
March 1: Hoover Dam is completed

- March 1 – Construction of Hoover Dam is completed in the United States.
- March 7 – In violation of the Treaty of Versailles and Locarno Treaties, Nazi Germany reoccupies the Rhineland. Hitler and other Nazis later admit that the French army alone could have destroyed the Wehrmacht.
- March 9 – Pro-democratic militarist Keisuke Okada steps down as Prime Minister of Japan and is replaced by radical militarist Kōki Hirota.
- March 15 – Austrian Josef Bradl sets the men's world record ski jump at 101.5 metres (333 ft) on Bloudkova velikanka hill in Planica and becomes the first man in history to stand jump over one hundred metres. (Note: The result scoreboard at that time had place only for three numbers, as organizing committee wasn't really prepared for one hundred metres barrier to be broken. Newspapers Jutro and Slovenec publish 101 metres on the next day and news spread fast around the world. Many decades took to publish real measured 101.5 metres distance, engraved in his original trophy from Planica (Salzburger Landesskimuseum).)
- April 5 – A tornado hits Tupelo, Mississippi, United States, killing 216 people and injuring over 700 (the 4th deadliest tornado in U.S. history).
- April 15 – The Tulkarm shooting, followed by Jewish retaliation, begins the 1936–1939 Arab revolt in Palestine against British administration, and stokes opposition to Jewish immigration.

=== May–June ===
- May 5 – March of the Iron Will: Italian forces occupy Addis Ababa unopposed.
- May 9 – Speaking in Rome, Benito Mussolini announces the foundation of the empire, as Italian East Africa is formed from the Italian territories of Eritrea, Ethiopia and Italian Somaliland.
- May 25 – The Remington Rand strike of 1936–37 begins, spawning the notorious Mohawk Valley formula, a corporate plan for strikebreaking.
- May 28 - Alan Turing submits "On Computable Numbers", proving the undecidability of the Halting problem and the decision problem for logic. Computer scientist Avi Wigderson called this paper "easily the most influential math paper in history".
- June 19
  - Per Albin Hansson resigns as Prime Minister of Sweden, over the issue of defence policy. He is replaced by the leader of the Farmer's League (Bondeförbundet) Axel Pehrsson-Bramstorp, who also becomes Minister of Agriculture.
  - The total solar eclipse of June 19, 1936 is visible in Greece, Turkey, Russia and Japan. It is part of Solar Saros 126; Gamma is a value of 0.53889.
- June 26 – Focke-Wulf Fw 61, the first fully controllable helicopter, makes its maiden flight.

=== July–August ===
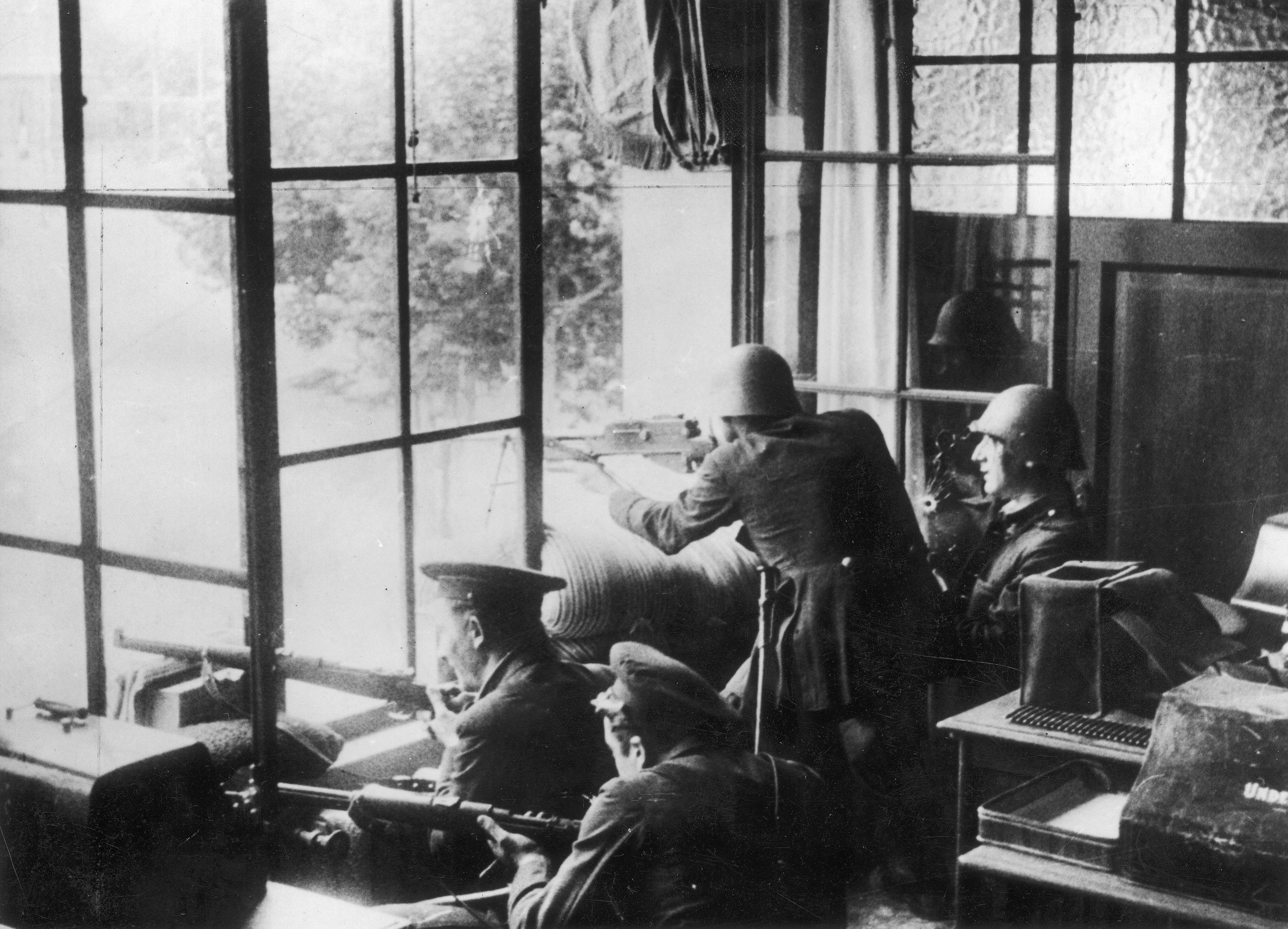
July 17: Republican soldiers and Assault Guards during the July 1936 uprising in Barcelona, Spain

- July 4 – First publication recognizing stress as a biological condition.
- July 17 – The Spanish Army of Africa launches a coup d'état against the Republican Second Spanish Republic, beginning the Spanish Civil War.
- July 19 – The first of hundreds of concentration camps open in Francoist Spain in the Alcazaba of Zeluán.
- July 20 – The Montreux Convention Regarding the Regime of the Straits is signed in Montreux, allowing Turkey to fortify the Dardanelles and the Bosphorus, but guaranteeing free passage to ships of all nations in peacetime.
- July 24 – Carmelite Martyrs of Guadalajara: 3 nuns are shot dead by the Republican faction (Spanish Civil War).
- August 1 – The 1936 Summer Olympics open in Berlin, Germany, and mark the first live television coverage of an international sports event in world history (John Logie Baird had broadcast the Derby horse race in Britain in 1931).
- August 3 – 1936 Summer Olympics: African-American athlete Jesse Owens wins the 100-meter dash.
- August 4 – A self-coup is staged by Greek Prime Minister Ioannis Metaxas, marking the beginning of the authoritarian 4th of August Regime, which will rule Greece until the Axis occupation of Greece in 1941.
- August 14 – 1936 Summer Olympics: The Varsity Rowing Crew from the University of Washington surprises the world listening on radio when they come from behind to win Olympic Gold.
- August 26 – The Anglo-Egyptian Treaty of 1936 is signed.

=== September–October ===
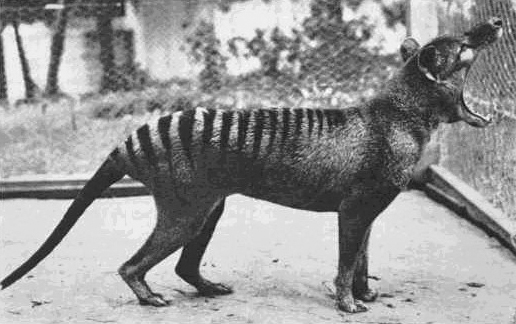
September 7: Extinction of Thylacine.

- September 4–5 – English-born aviator Beryl Markham becomes the first woman to make an east-to-west solo transatlantic flight, from Abingdon-on-Thames, England, to Baleine, Nova Scotia.
- September 5 – Spanish Civil War: Robert Capa's photograph The Falling Soldier is taken.
- September 7 – The last known thylacine ("Tasmanian tiger") dies in Hobart Zoo in Tasmania.
- September 9
  - 1936 Naval Revolt (Portugal): The crews of Portuguese Navy frigate NRP Afonso de Albuquerque and destroyer Dão mutiny while anchored in Lisbon Harbour. Opposed to the Salazar dictatorship's support of General Franco's coup in Spain, they declare their solidarity with the Second Spanish Republic.
  - The Franco-Syrian Treaty of Independence is signed.
- September 10 – The first World Speedway Championship is held at Wembley Stadium in London, England. It is won by Australian Lionel Van Praag, with Englishman Eric Langton second and Australian Bluey Wilkinson third.
- September 13 – In response to a polio outbreak, Chicago Public Schools launches a distance education program which constitutes the first large-scale use of radio broadcasts to facilitate distance education.
- September 28 – After the election to the Swedish Riksdag's second chamber, Axel Pehrsson-Bramstorp and his "Holiday Cabinet" ("Semesterregeringen") resign (though he remains as Minister of Agriculture) and Per Albin Hansson returns as Prime Minister, staying in office until his death from a heart attack in 1946.
- October
  - Joseph Stalin's Great Purge begins in the Soviet Union.
  - The Viking Age craftsman's Mästermyr chest is discovered in the Mästermyr mire (after which it is later named), west of Hemse, on the island of Gotland, Sweden.
- October 19 – H. R. Ekins, reporter for the New York World-Telegram, wins a race to travel around the world on commercial airline flights, beating Dorothy Kilgallen of the New York Journal and Leo Kieran of The New York Times. The flight takes 18½ days.
- October 25 – The Italo-German protocol of 23 October 1936 is signed, resulting in the creation of the Axis.

=== November–December ===
- November 2
  - The BBC launches the world's first regular television service in high-definition (according to contemporary standards).
  - The Canadian Broadcasting Corporation (CBC) begins radio in Canada.
- November 3 – 1936 United States presidential election: Franklin D. Roosevelt is reelected to a second term, in a landslide victory over Kansas Governor Alf Landon; farmers support Roosevelt.
- November 12 – In California, the San Francisco–Oakland Bay Bridge opens to traffic.
- November 19 and 20 – Buenaventura Durruti, a major Spanish anarchist, is fatally shot in Madrid, dying the following day.
- November 20 – A levee failure and continued massive rain at the Mitsubishi Osarizawa mine, Kazuno, northeastern Akita, Japan, results in at least 375 deaths.
- November 23 – Cover date of the first issue of Life, a weekly news magazine launched in the United States under the management of Henry Luce.
- November 25 – The Anti-Comintern Pact is signed by Germany and Japan.
- November 30 – A spectacular fire destroys The Crystal Palace in London, originally built for the 1851 Great Exhibition.
- December 5 – The 1936 Soviet Constitution, promulgated by Stalin, is adopted in the Soviet Union. The Transcaucasian Socialist Federative Soviet Republic is dissolved, and Armenia, Azerbaijan and Georgia become full Republics of the Soviet Union.
- December 7 – Streptococcous meningitis (a condition previously 99% fatal) is successfully treated for the first time with a sulfonamide.
- December 10 – Edward VIII abdication crisis: King Edward VIII of the United Kingdom signs an instrument of abdication at Fort Belvedere, Surrey in the presence of his three brothers, The Duke of York, The Duke of Gloucester and The Duke of Kent.
- December 11
  - Edward VIII abdication crisis: The British Parliament passes His Majesty's Declaration of Abdication Act 1936 on behalf of the U.K., Australia, New Zealand and South Africa. The King performs his last act as sovereign by giving Royal Assent to the Act, and his brother Prince Albert, Duke of York, becomes King, reigning as King George VI. The former King, now HRH Prince Edward, makes a broadcast to the nation explaining his decision to abdicate, and leaves the country for Austria.
  - Taking the opportunity to free itself further from ties to the United Kingdom, the Oireachtas of the Irish Free State passes the Constitution (Amendment No. 27) Act 1936, removing most powers from the office of Governor-General of the Irish Free State, and the Executive Authority (External Relations) Act 1936 (signed into law December 12), assenting to the abdication and restricting the power of the monarch in relation to Ireland to international affairs.
- December 12 – Xi'an Incident: Generalissimo Chiang Kai-shek of the Republic of China is kidnapped by Marshal Zhang Xueliang.
- December 24 – The first filmed Ukrainian opera, Natalka Poltavka, is released in Ukraine.

=== Date unknown ===
- West China Famine: An estimated five million people die.
- Nestlé introduce the white chocolate Milkybar (called Galak in Continental Europe and elsewhere).

== Births ==
=== January ===
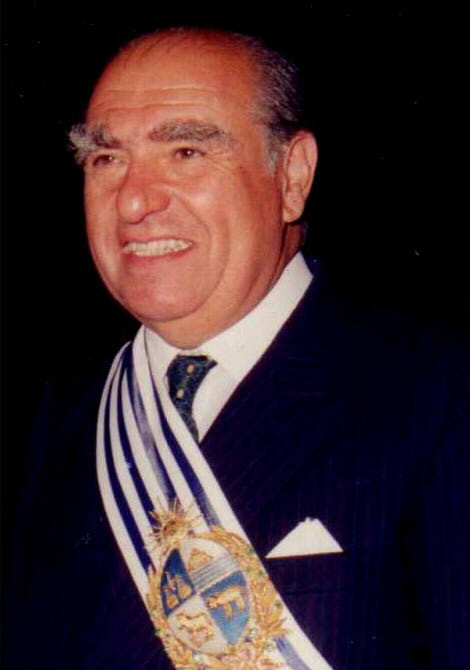
Julio María Sanguinetti

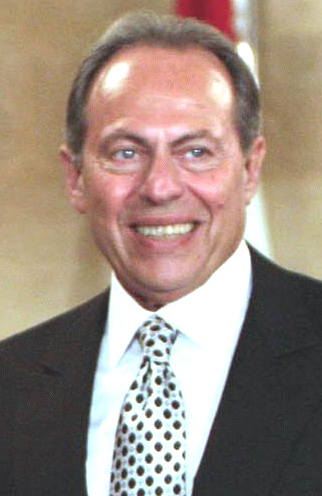
Émile Lahoud

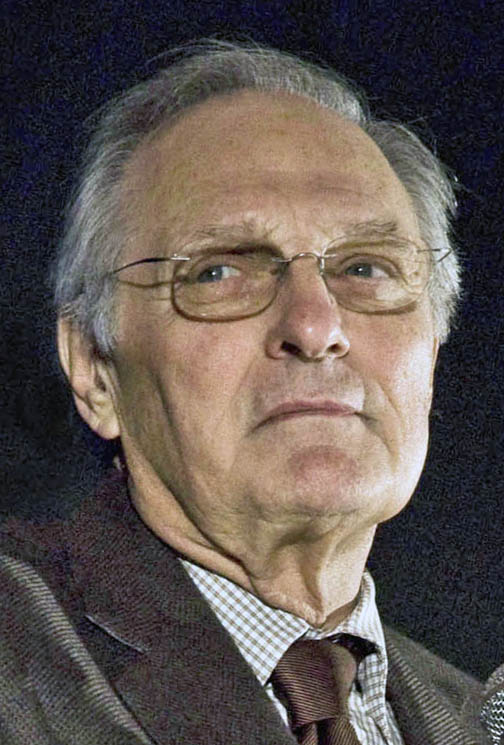
Alan Alda

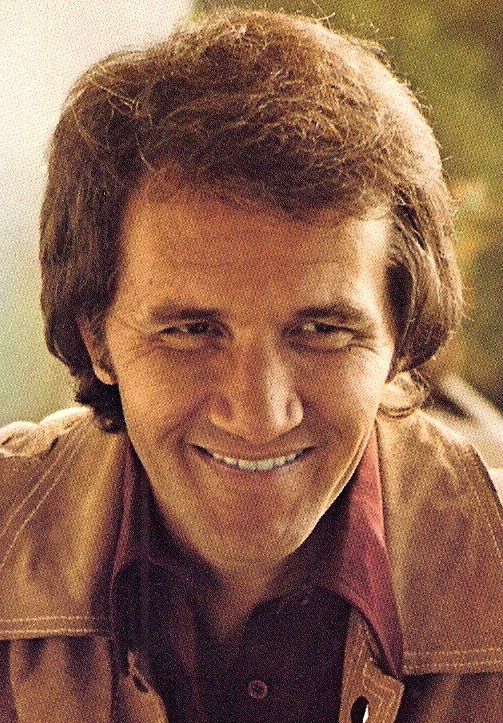
Roger Miller

- January 2 – Roger Miller, American singer-songwriter, musician and actor (d. 1992)
- January 6
  - Darlene Hard, American tennis player (d. 2021)
  - Alejandro Maldonado, 37th President of Guatemala
  - Julio María Sanguinetti, 2-time President of Uruguay
- January 8 – Robert May, Australian scientist (d. 2020)
- January 10
  - Stephen E. Ambrose, American historian and biographer (d. 2002)
  - Robert Wilson, American physicist and radio astronomer, Nobel laureate
- January 11 – Eva Hesse, American sculptor and textile artist (d. 1970)
- January 12 – Émile Lahoud, 15th President of Lebanon
- January 14 – Reiner Klimke, German equestrian (d. 1999)
- January 19 – Ziaur Rahman, 7th President of Bangladesh (d. 1981)
- January 22
  - Alan J. Heeger, American physicist and Nobel laureate
  - Ong Teng Cheong, 5th President of Singapore (d. 2002)
- January 23 – Cécile Ousset, French pianist
- January 25 – Diana Hyland, American actress (d. 1977)
- January 27
  - Barry Barish, American gravitational physicist, Nobel laureate
  - Troy Donahue, American actor (d. 2001)
  - Samuel C. C. Ting, American physicist, Nobel laureate
- January 28
  - Alan Alda, American actor, director, screenwriter, comedian and author
  - Ismail Kadare, Albanian writer (d. 2024)
- January 29 – James Jamerson, American bassist (d. 1983)

=== February ===
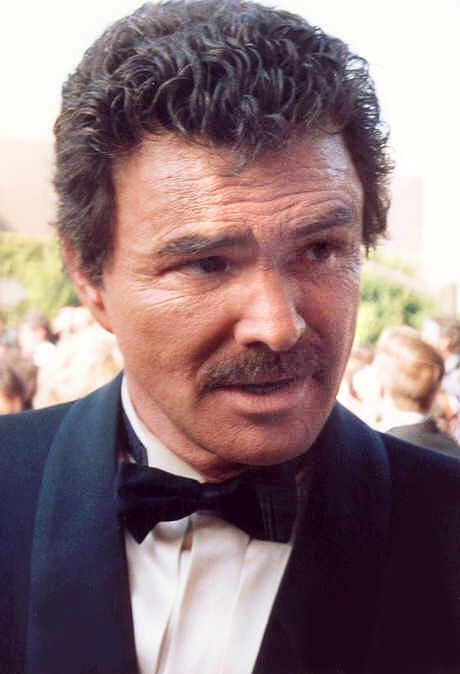
Burt Reynolds

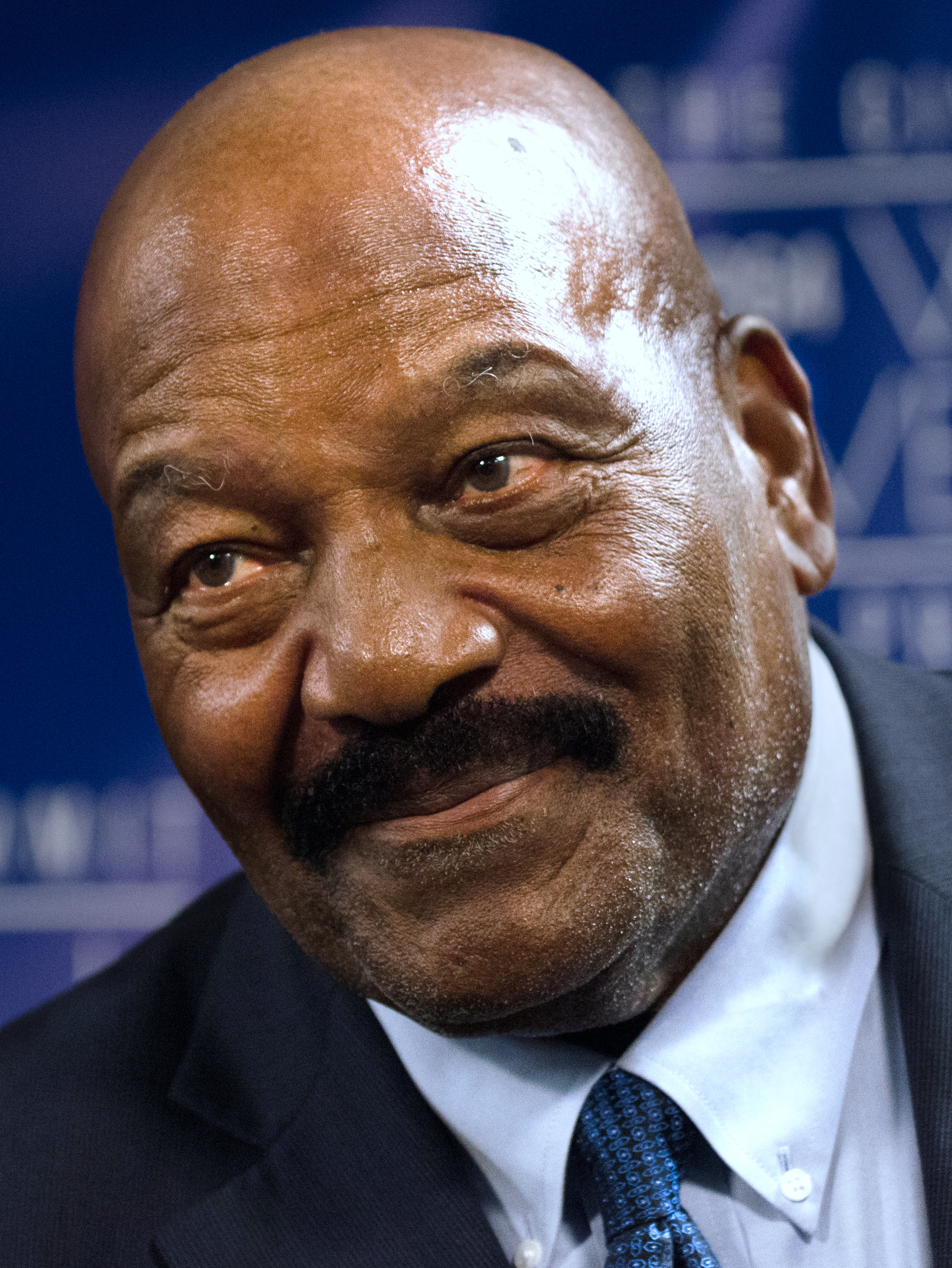
Jim Brown

- February 3
  - Jeanine Basinger, American film historian
  - Bob Simpson, Australian cricketer (d. 2025)
- February 4
  - David Brenner, American actor and comedian (d. 2014)
  - Gary Conway, American actor
- February 6 – Kent Douglas, Canadian ice hockey player, coach (d. 2009)
- February 9 – Princess Elizabeth of Tooro, Princess Royal of the Kingdom of Tooro
- February 11 – Burt Reynolds, American actor (d. 2018)
- February 15 – Richard Michaels, American film director
- February 16 – Carl Icahn, American businessman, investor and philanthropist
- February 17 – Jim Brown, African-American football player and actor (d. 2023)
- February 21 – Barbara Jordan, African-American lawyer, educator, politician and civil rights activist (d. 1996)
- February 24
  - Jess Conrad, British actor and singer
  - Carol D'Onofrio, American public health researcher (d. 2020)
- February 25 – Jerry Reinsdorf, American Sports Executive
- February 26 – Adem Demaçi, Albanian politician, writer (d. 2018)
- February 27 – Fred Haines, American film director and screenwriter (d. 2008)
- February 29 – Alex Rocco, American actor (d. 2015)

=== March ===
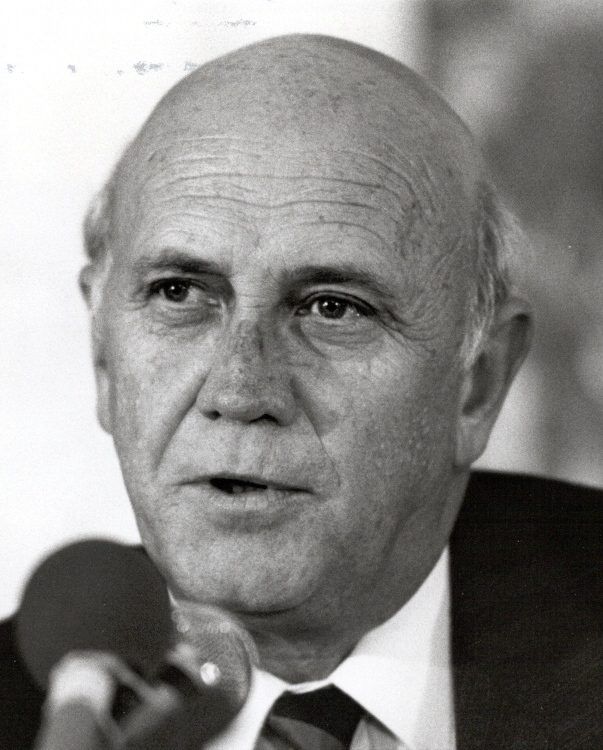
F. W. De Klerk

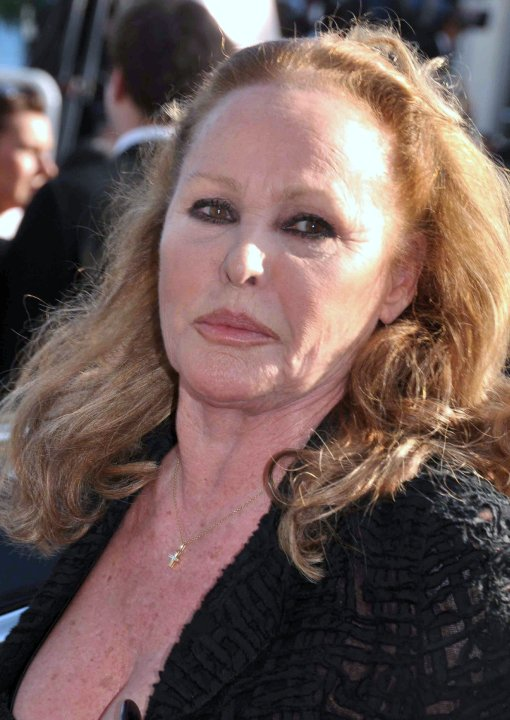
Ursula Andress

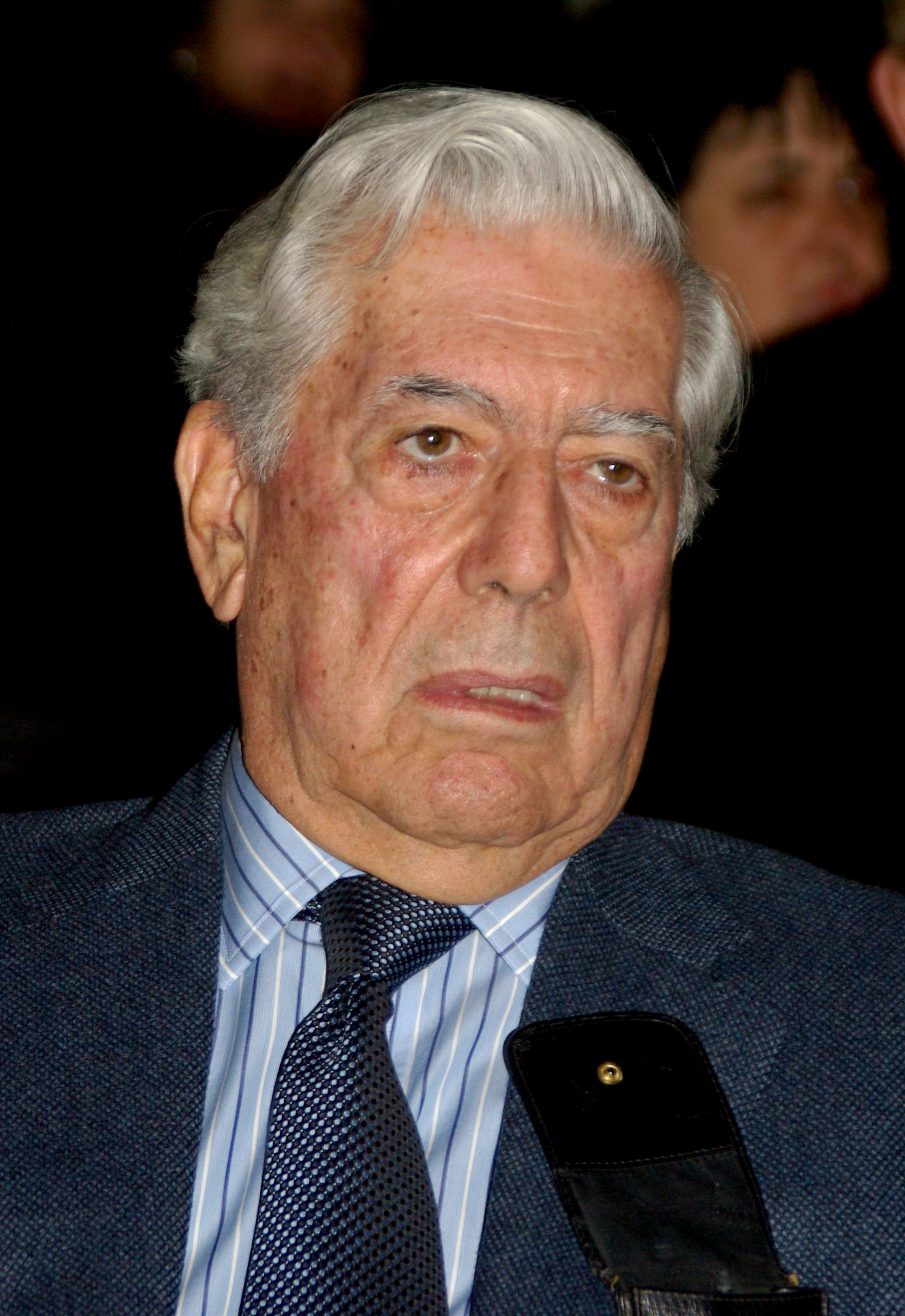
Mario Vargas Llosa

- March 4
  - Jim Clark, Scottish race car driver (d. 1968)
  - Kim Yong-chun, North Korean soldier, politician (d. 2018)
  - Aribert Reimann, German composer (d. 2024)
- March 5
  - Canaan Banana, 1st President of Zimbabwe (d. 2003)
  - Dean Stockwell, American actor (d. 2021)
- March 6
  - Marion Barry, African-American civil rights activist and politician (d. 2014)
  - Choummaly Sayasone, 5th President of Laos
- March 7
  - Loren Acton, American astronaut
  - Galen Cisco, American baseball player
  - Julio Terrazas Sandoval, Bolivian cardinal (d. 2015)
- March 9 – Mickey Gilley, American country singer (d. 2022)
- March 10 – Sepp Blatter, Swiss sports administrator, president of FIFA
- March 11
  - Harald zur Hausen, German virologist (d. 2023)
  - Takis Mousafiris, Greek composer and songwriter (d. 2021)
  - Antonin Scalia, Associate Justice of the Supreme Court of the United States (d. 2016)
- March 17 – Ken Mattingly, American astronaut (d. 2023)
- March 18 – F. W. de Klerk, 7th and last State President of South Africa (d. 2021)
- March 19 – Ursula Andress, Swiss actress
- March 20 – Lee "Scratch" Perry, Jamaican musician (d. 2021)
- March 25 – Lawrence Gordon, American motion picture executive.
- March 27 – Banwari Lal Joshi, Indian politician (d. 2017)
- March 28 – Mario Vargas Llosa, Peruvian writer, politician, journalist and essayist, Nobel Prize laureate (d. 2025)

=== April ===
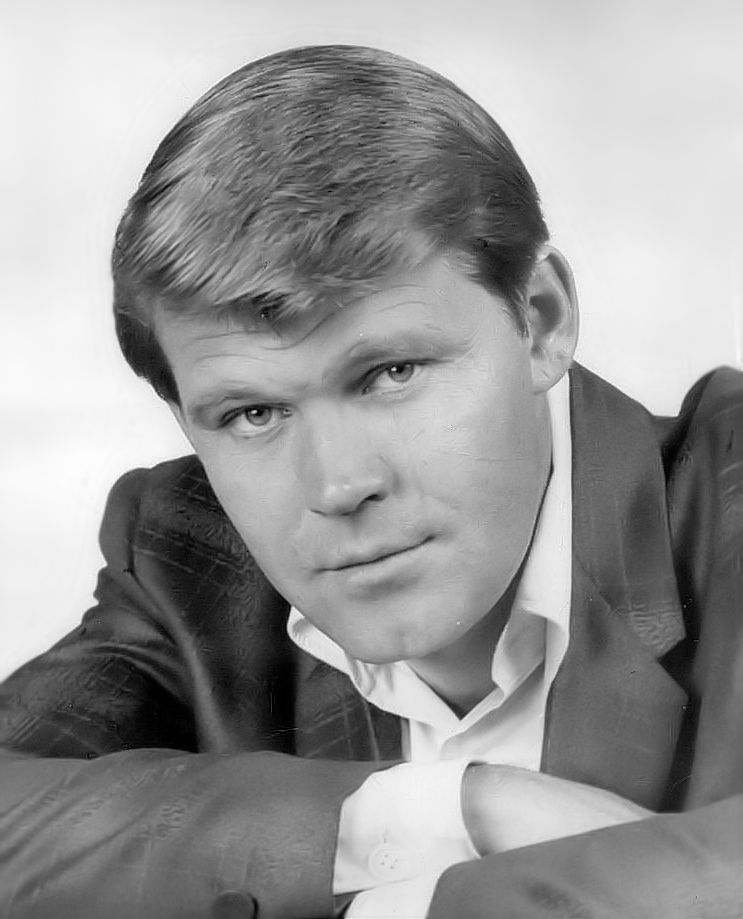
Glen Campbell

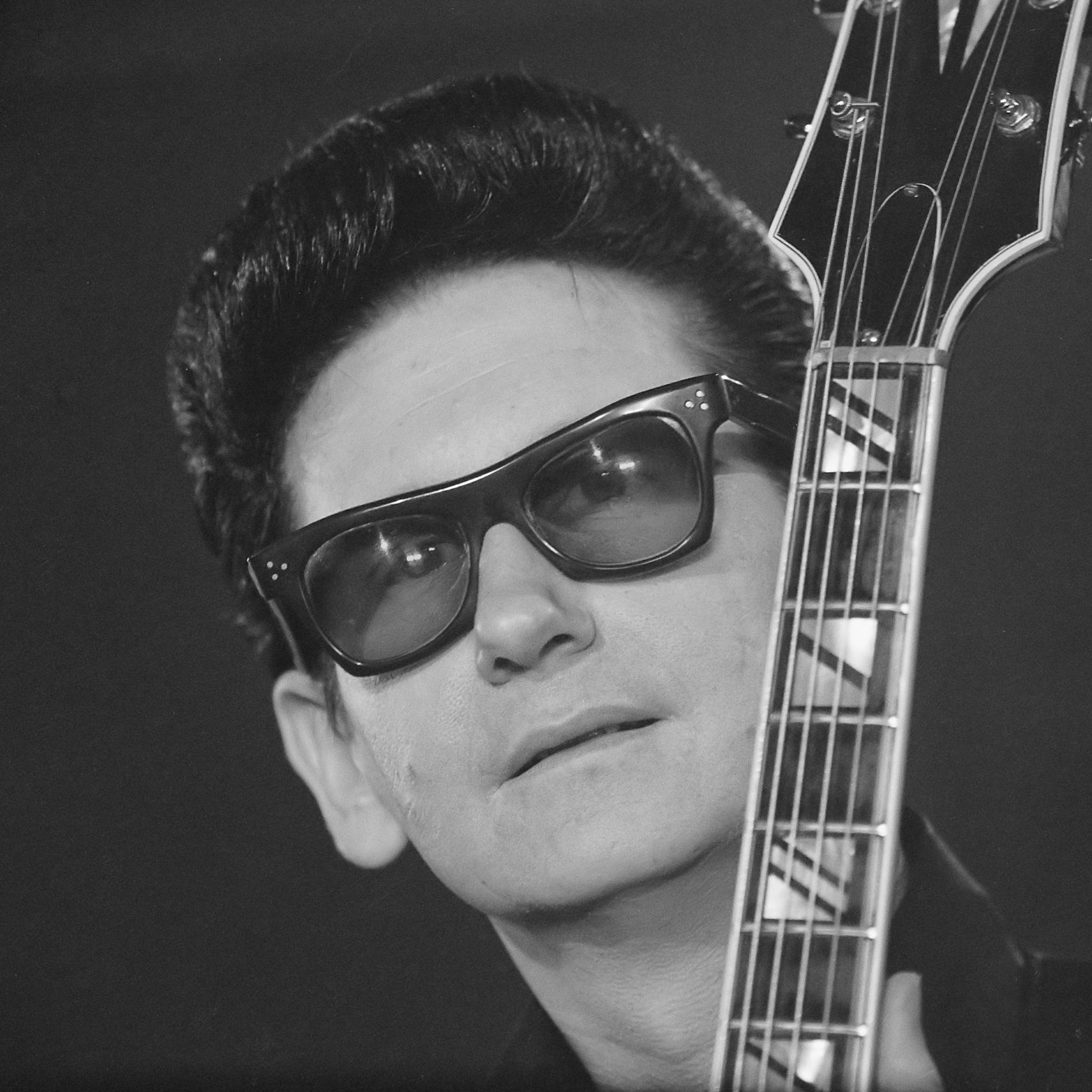
Roy Orbison

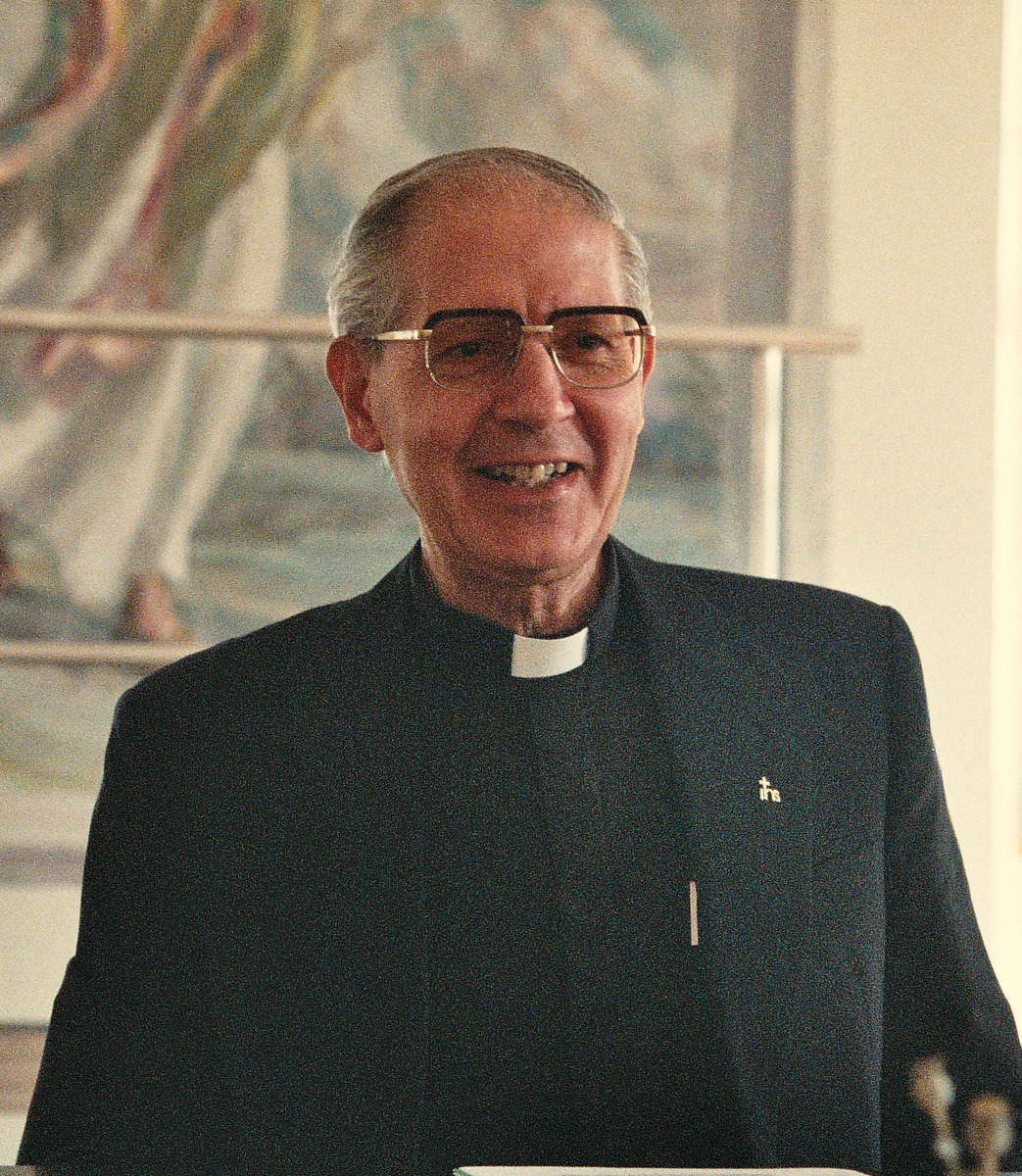
Adolfo Nicolás

- April 1 – Jean-Pascal Delamuraz, 2-time President of Switzerland (d. 1998)
- April 5 – Glenn Jordan, American film and television director
- April 9
  - Gloria Grosso, Italian politician
  - Valerie Solanas, American feminist writer who attempts to kill Andy Warhol (d. 1988)
  - Ferdinando Imposimato, Italian judge (d. 2018)
- April 12 – Charles Napier, American character actor (d. 2011)
- April 13 – Choi In-hun, South Korean writer (d. 2018)
- April 14
  - Dilbagh Singh Kler, Malaysian Olympic athlete (d. 2012)
  - Frank Serpico, American police officer
- April 15
  - Pen Sovan, Cambodian politician (d. 2016)
  - Raymond Poulidor, French road-bicycle racer（d. 2019）
- April 17 – Urs Wild, Swiss chemist (d. 2022)
- April 20 – Alfonso, Duke of Anjou and Cádiz (d. 1989)
- April 22 – Glen Campbell, American singer and actor (d. 2017)
- April 23 – Roy Orbison, American singer-songwriter (Pretty Woman) (d. 1988)
- April 24
  - Akwasi Afrifa, 3rd Head of State of Ghana (d. 1979)
  - Jill Ireland, English actress (d. 1990)
- April 28 – Tariq Aziz, Iraqi politician (d. 2015)
- April 29
  - Zubin Mehta, Indian conductor
  - Lane Smith, American actor (d. 2005)

=== May ===
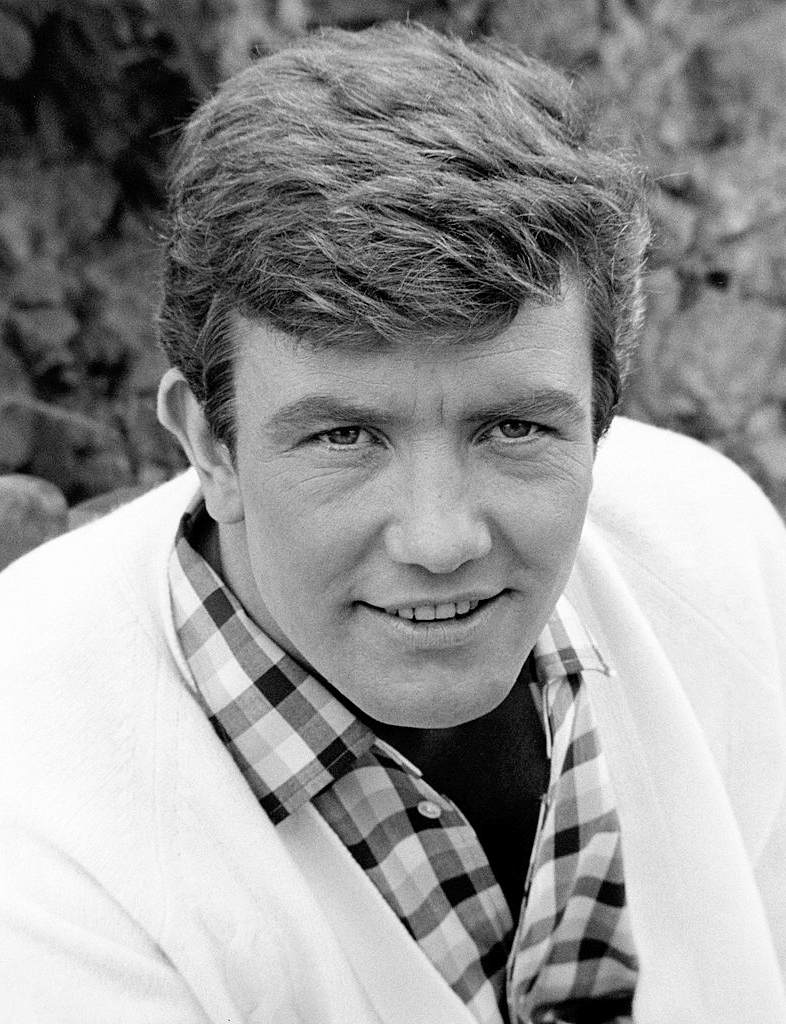
Albert Finney

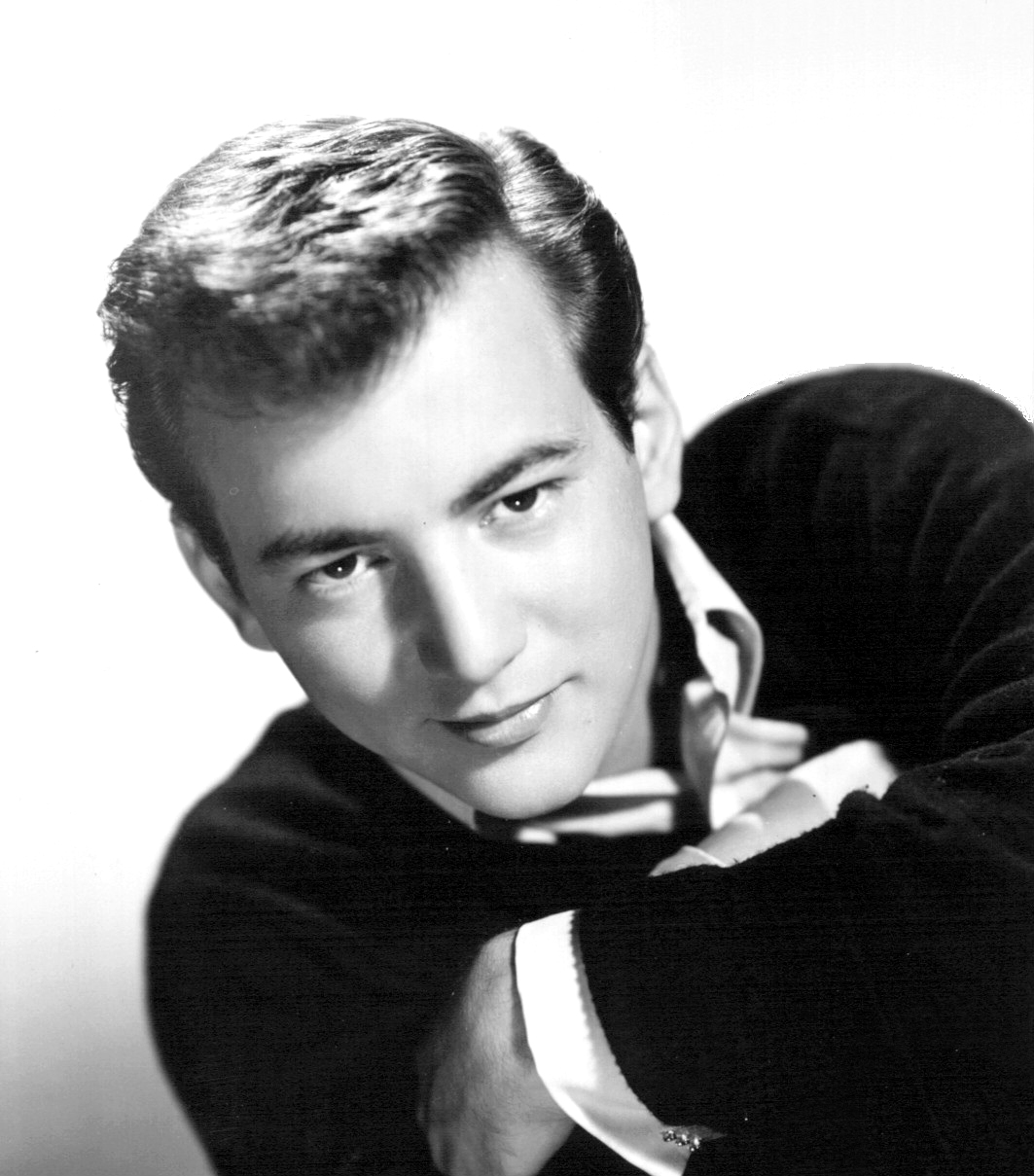
Bobby Darin

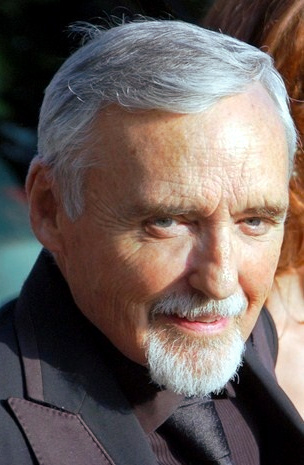
Dennis Hopper

- May 1 – Danièle Huillet, French filmmaker (d. 2006)
- May 2
  - Norma Aleandro, Argentinian actress
  - Engelbert Humperdinck (b. Arnold George Dorsey), British singer
- May 4 – El Cordobés, Spanish matador
- May 7 – Jimmy Ruffin, African-American singer (d. 2014)
- May 9
  - Albert Finney, English actor (d. 2019)
  - Glenda Jackson, English actress and politician (d. 2023)
  - Ernest Shonekan, 9th Head of State of Nigeria (d. 2022)
- May 12
  - Klaus Doldinger, German musician (d. 2025)
  - Guillermo Endara, 32nd President of Panama (1989–1994) (d. 2009)
- May 13 – Rafael Campos, Dominican actor (d. 1985)
- May 14 – Bobby Darin, American singer (d. 1973)
- May 15
  - Ralph Steadman, Welsh artist
  - Wavy Gravy, American performer
- May 16
  - Philippe de Montebello, American museum director
  - Karl Lehmann, German Catholic cardinal (d. 2018)
- May 17
  - Dennis Hopper, American actor and director (d. 2010)
  - Alfred R. Kelman, American film and television documentary producer and director
- May 20
  - Nickey Iyambo, Namibian politician, 1st Vice-President of Namibia (d. 2019)
  - Antanas Vaupšas, Lithuanian athlete (d. 2017)
  - Anthony Zerbe, American actor
- May 21
  - Joe Alves, American film production designer
  - Günter Blobel, German-American biologist, academic and Nobel Prize laureate (d. 2018)
  - Alan Heim, American film editor
- May 25 – Tom T. Hall, American country singer-songwriter (d. 2021)
- May 26 – Richard Harrison, American actor, writer, director and producer
- May 27 – Louis Gossett Jr., African-American actor (d. 2024)
- May 28 – John Wilder, American producer and former actor
- May 30 – Keir Dullea, American actor

=== June ===
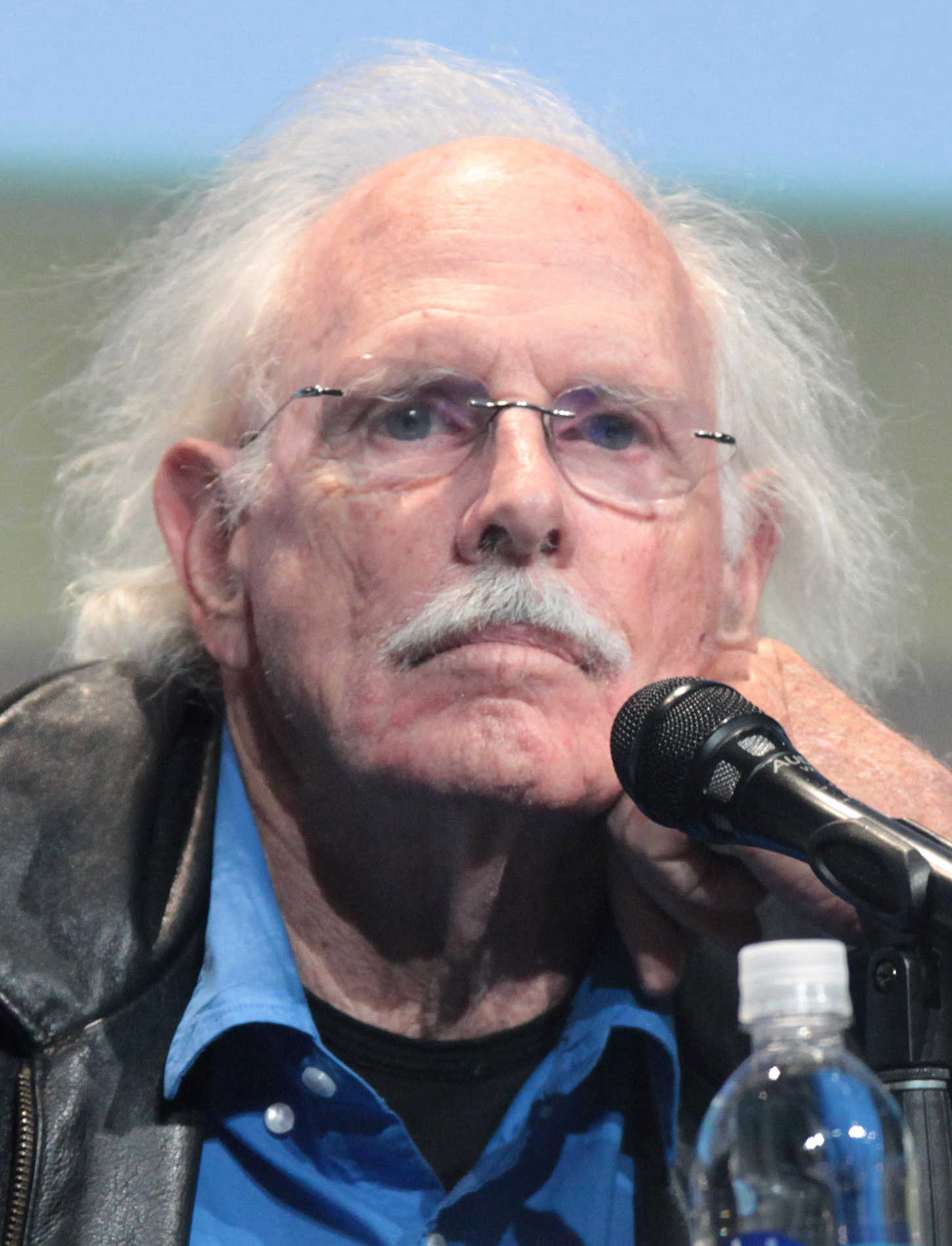
Bruce Dern

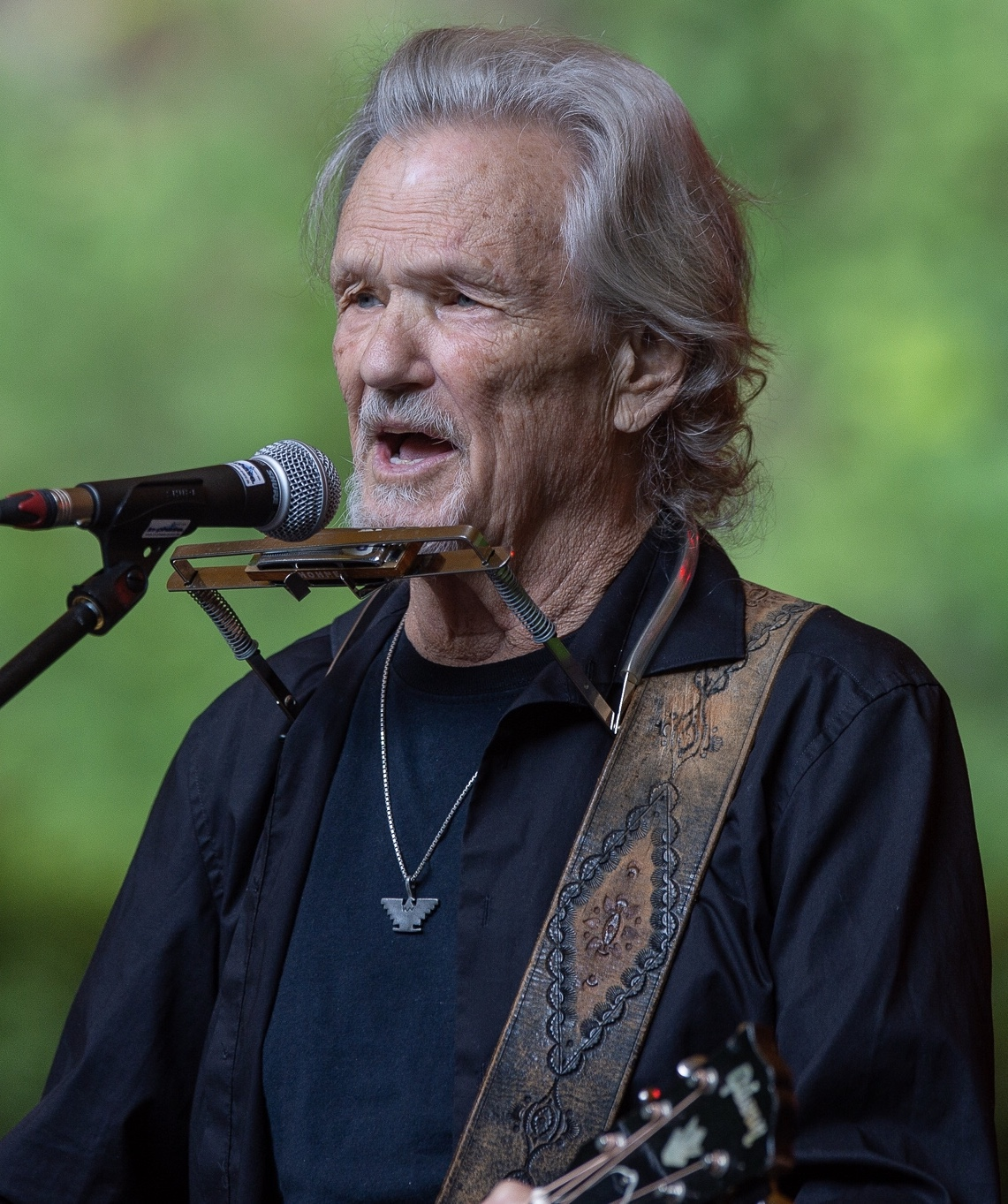
Kris Kristofferson

B. J. Habibie

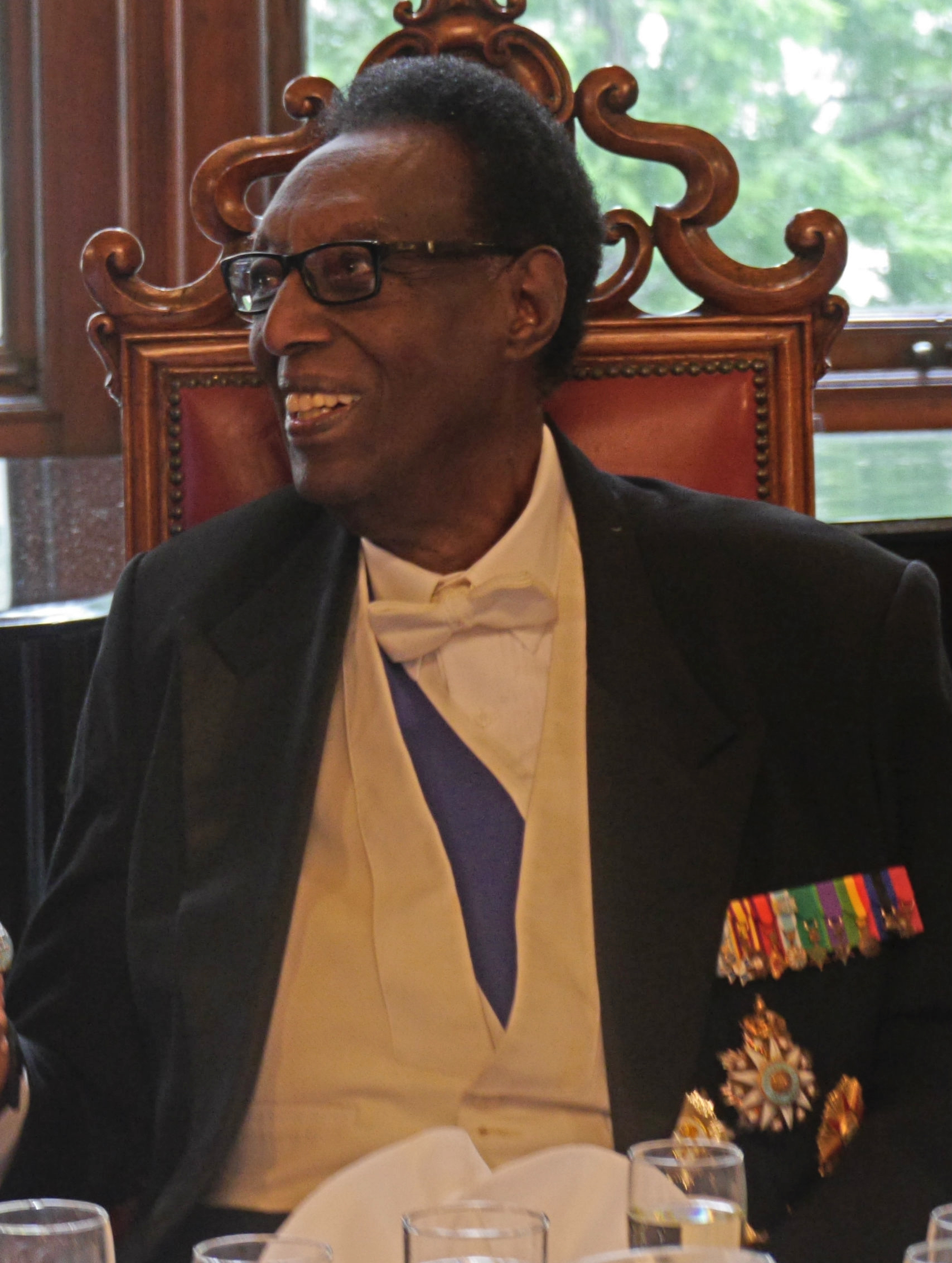
Kigeli V Ndahindurwa, King of Rwanda

- June 2 – Volodymyr Holubnychy, Soviet Olympic athlete (d. 2021)
- June 3 – Colin Meads, New Zealand rugby union player (d. 2017)
- June 4
  - Bruce Dern, American actor
  - Nutan, Indian actress (d. 1991)
- June 8
  - James Darren, American actor and singer (d. 2024)
  - Kenneth G. Wilson, American Nobel Prize-winning physicist (d. 2013)
- June 12 – Kevin Thomas, American film critic
- June 17 – Ken Loach, British film director
- June 18
  - Denny Hulme, New Zealand racing driver (d. 1992)
  - Ronald Venetiaan, president of Suriname (d. 2025)
- June 19 – Takeshi Aono, Japanese actor (d. 2012)
- June 22
  - Kris Kristofferson, American actor and singer-songwriter (d. 2024)
  - Izatullo Khayoyev, 1st Prime Minister of Tajikistan (d. 2015)
  - Hermeto Pascoal, Brazilian composer and multi-instrumentalist (d. 2025)
- June 23 – Costas Simitis, Greek politician, 78th Prime Minister of Greece (d. 2025)
- June 24 – Robert Downey Sr., American actor, filmmaker and father of actor Robert Downey Jr. (d. 2021)
- June 25 – B. J. Habibie, Indonesian politician, 3rd President of Indonesia (d. 2019)
- June 26
  - Hal Greer, African-American professional basketball player (d. 2018)
  - Lee Ming-liang, Taiwanese geneticist
- June 27
  - Geneviève Fontanel, French stage, film actress (d. 2018)
  - Joe Doyle, Irish politician (d. 2009)
- June 29
  - David Jenkins, American figure skater
  - Eddie Mabo, Australian Indigenous rights activist (d. 1992)
  - Kigeli V Ndahindurwa, last king of Rwanda (d. 2016)
- June 30
  - Assia Djebar, Algerian writer (d. 2015)
  - Nancy Dussault, American actress and singer

=== July ===
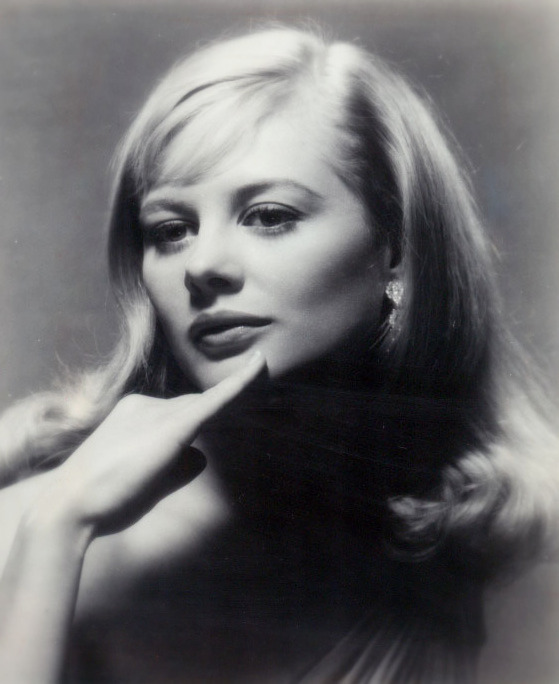
Shirley Knight

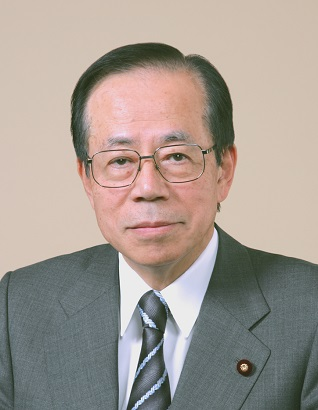
Yasuo Fukuda

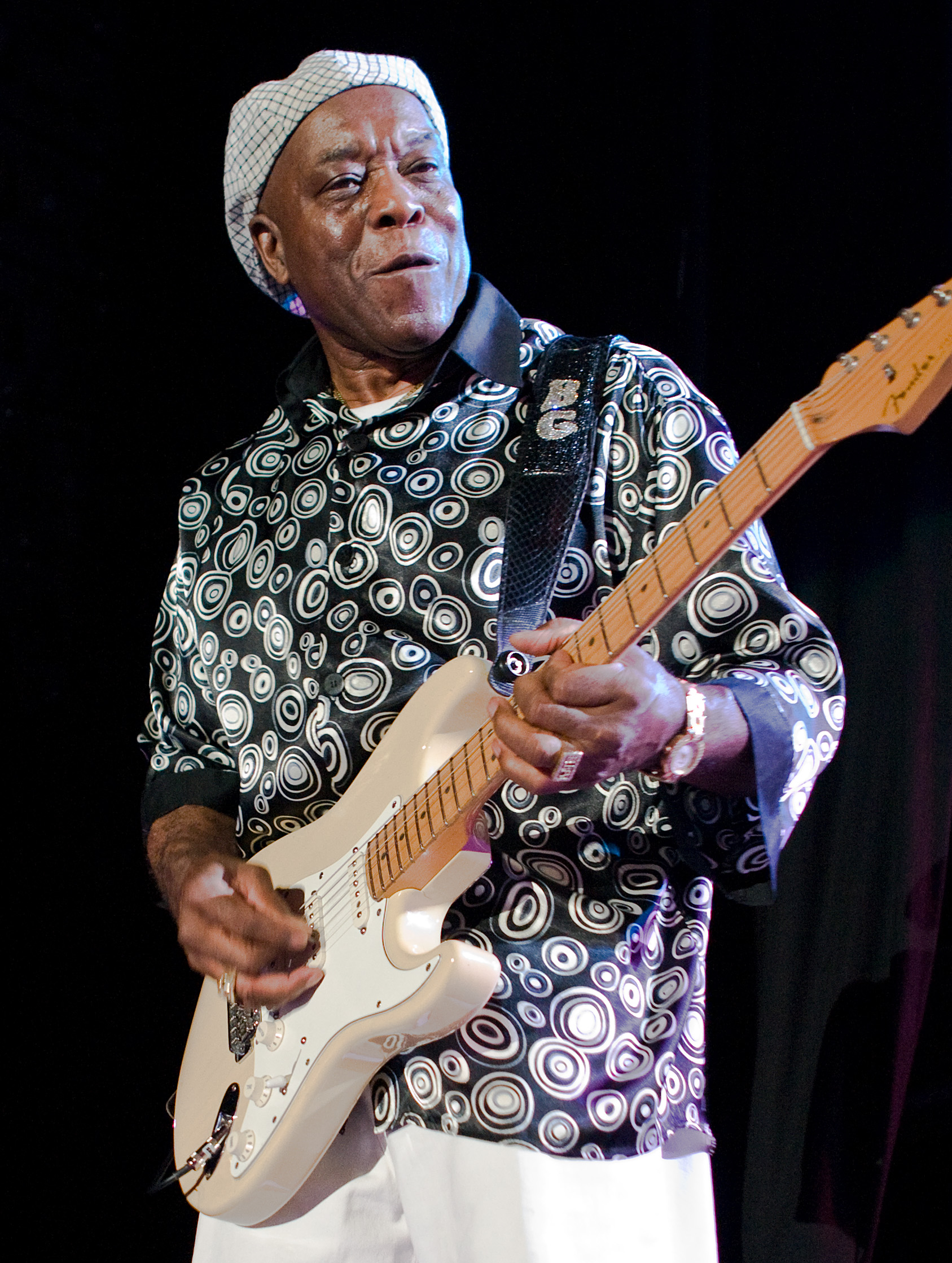
Buddy Guy

- July 1 – Antonio Salines, Italian actor and director (d. 2021)
- July 4 – Günter Vetter, Austrian politician (d. 2022)
- July 5
  - Sir Frederick Ballantyne, Governor-General of Saint Vincent and the Grenadines (d. 2020)
  - Shirley Knight, American actress (d. 2020)
  - Sir James Mirrlees, Scottish-born economist, winner of the 1996 Nobel Memorial Prize in Economic Sciences (d. 2018)
- July 7
  - Hammoudi Al-Harithi, Iraqi actor (d. 2024)
  - Anatoly Kirov, Soviet wrestler
  - Nikos Xilouris, Greek singer (d. 1980)
- July 8 – Johan Du Preez, Rhodesian-Zimbabwean sprinter
- July 16
  - Yasuo Fukuda, 58th Prime Minister of Japan (d. 2026)
  - Sanford Lieberson, American film producer
  - Miria Obote, First Lady of Uganda
  - Leo Sterckx, Belgian cyclist (d. 2023)
  - Venkataraman Subramanya, Indian cricketer
- July 20 – Barbara Mikulski, US Senator
- July 26
  - John Farris, American fiction writer
  - Neelu, Indian actor (d. 2018)
- July 28 – Garfield Sobers, Barbadian cricketer (d. 2026)
- July 29 – Elizabeth Dole, US Senator
- July 30
  - Buddy Guy, African-American blues singer and guitarist
  - Infanta Pilar, Duchess of Badajoz, Spanish royal (d. 2020)
- July 31 – Jorge Sanjinés, Bolivian film director and screenwriter

=== August ===
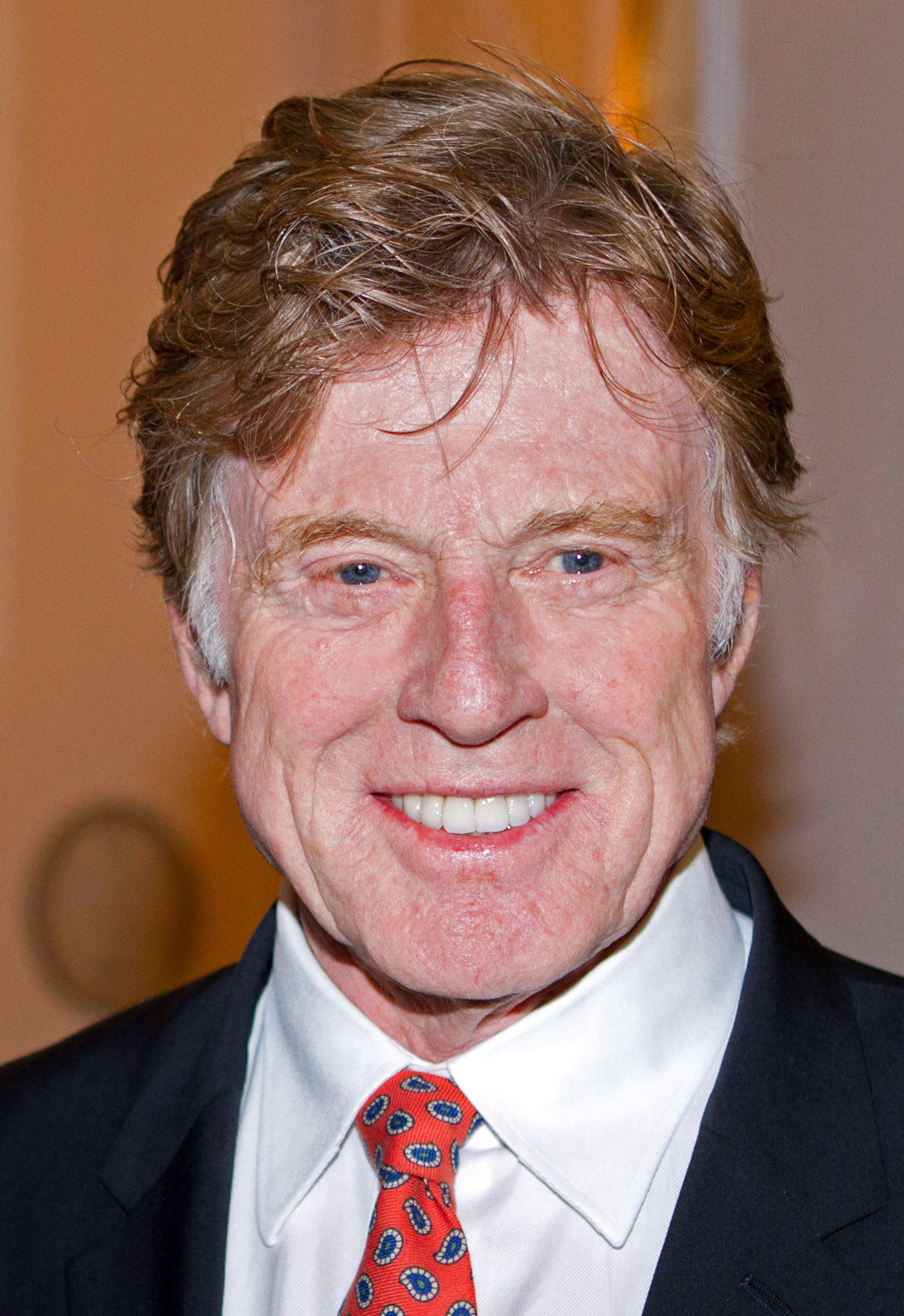
Robert Redford

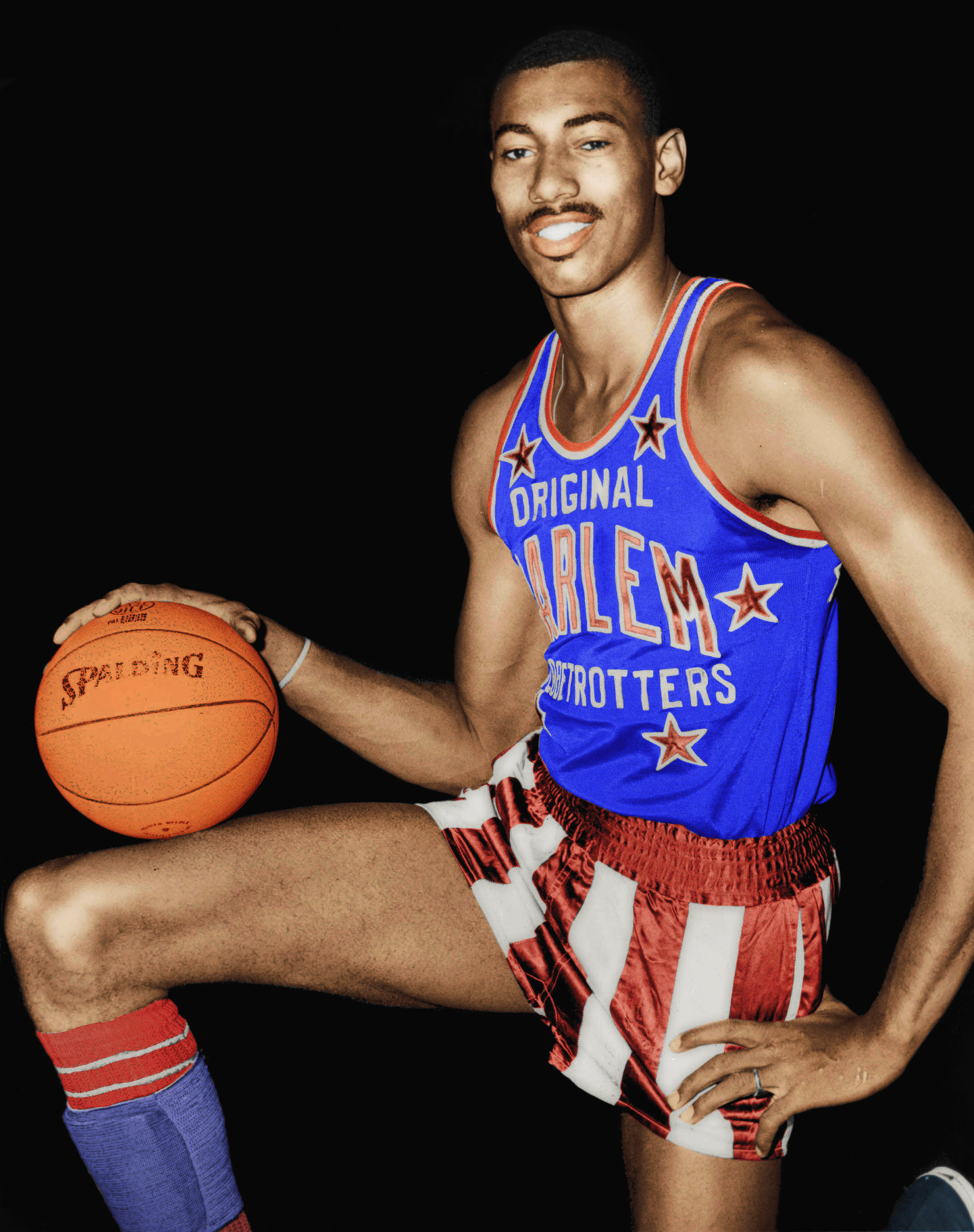
Wilt Chamberlain

- August 1
  - Yves Saint Laurent, Algerian-born French fashion designer (d. 2008)
  - Chadlia Farhat Essebsi, Tunisian consort, 5th First Lady of Tunisia (d. 2019)
- August 3 – Edward Petherbridge, British actor
- August 12
  - Kjell Grede, Swedish film director (d. 2017)
  - André Kolingba, President of Central African Republic (d. 2010)
  - John Poindexter, American political figure
- August 15 – Pat Priest, American actress
- August 16 – Anita Gillette, American actress
- August 17 – Margaret Hamilton, American computer scientist, systems engineer and business owner (d. 2026)
- August 18 – Robert Redford, American actor and film director (d. 2025)
- August 21 – Luisa Isabel Álvarez de Toledo, 21st Duchess of Medina Sidonia, (d. 2008)
- August 23 – Rudy Lewis, American rhythm and blues singer (d. 1964)
- August 25 – Giridharilal Kedia, Indian Working President of KVK (d. 2009)
- August 26 – Benedict Anderson, American academic (d. 2015)
- August 27 – Lien Chan, Taiwanese politician
- August 28 – Bert Schneider, Austrian road racer (d. 2009)
- August 29 – John McCain, American politician, U.S. Senator (R-Az.) (d. 2018)
- August 31 – Fabrizia Ramondino, Italian author (d. 2008)

=== September ===
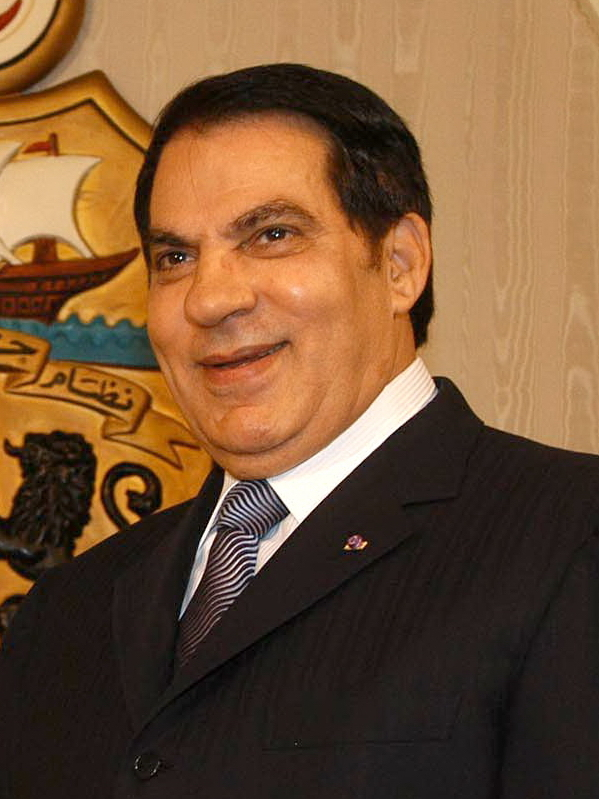
Zine El Abidine Ben Ali

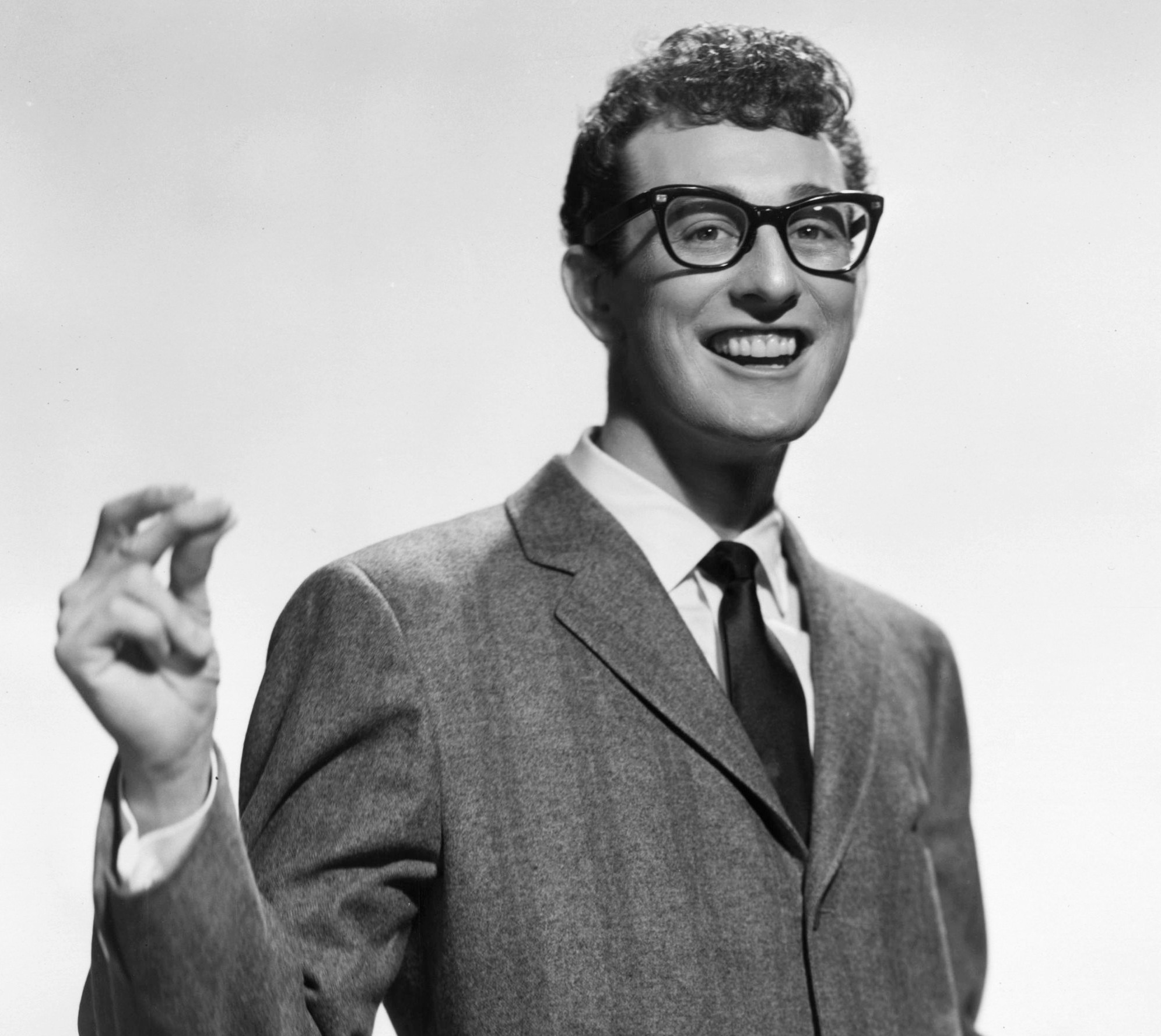
Buddy Holly

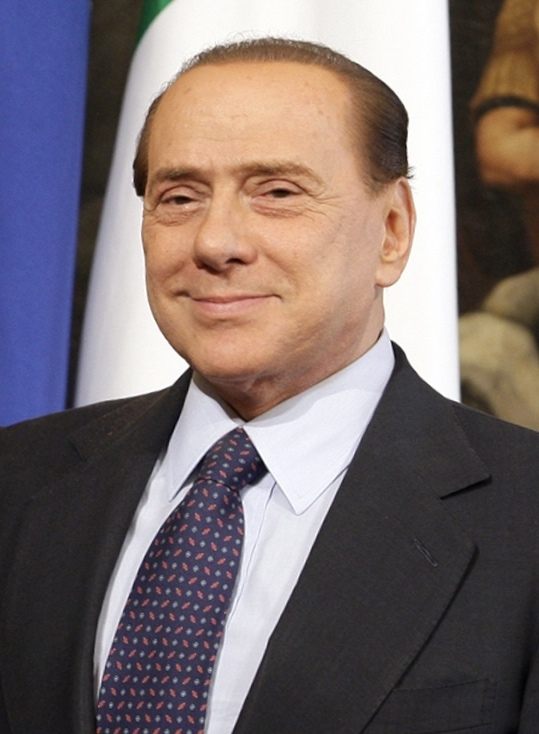
Silvio Berlusconi

- September 1 – Valery Legasov, Soviet inorganic chemist (d. 1988)
- September 2 – Andrew Grove, Hungarian-American businessman, engineer and author (d. 2016)
- September 3 – Zine El Abidine Ben Ali, 2nd President of Tunisia (d. 2019)
- September 4 – Kamuta Latasi, 4th Prime Minister of Tuvalu
- September 5 – John Danforth, US Senator Missouri
- September 7
  - Buddy Holly, American rock-and-roll singer-songwriter and musician (d. 1959)
  - Jorge Porcel, Argentine-American actor (d. 2006)
- September 9 – Jerrold Immel, American television music composer
- September 10 – Jörgen Persson, Swedish cinematographer
- September 14 – Walter Koenig, American actor (Star Trek: The Original Series) (d. 2026)
- September 15 – Ashley Cooper, Australian tennis player (d. 2020)
- September 18 – Ruth Hesse, German mezzo-soprano (d. 2024)
- September 19 – Al Oerter, American Olympic athlete (d. 2007)
- September 21
  - Dickey Lee, American musician
  - Yury Luzhkov, mayor of Moscow (d. 2019)
- September 23 – Valentín Paniagua, President of Peru (d. 2006)
- September 24 – Jim Henson, American puppeteer, filmmaker and television producer (The Muppets) (d. 1990)
- September 25 – Moussa Traoré, President of Mali (d. 2020)
- September 26 – Winnie Madikizela-Mandela, South African anti-apartheid activist (d. 2018)
- September 27 – Joselo, Venezuelan actor, comedian (d. 2013)
- September 28 – Robert Wolders, Dutch actor (d. 2018)
- September 29 – Silvio Berlusconi, 50th Prime Minister of Italy, media entrepreneur (d. 2023)

=== October ===
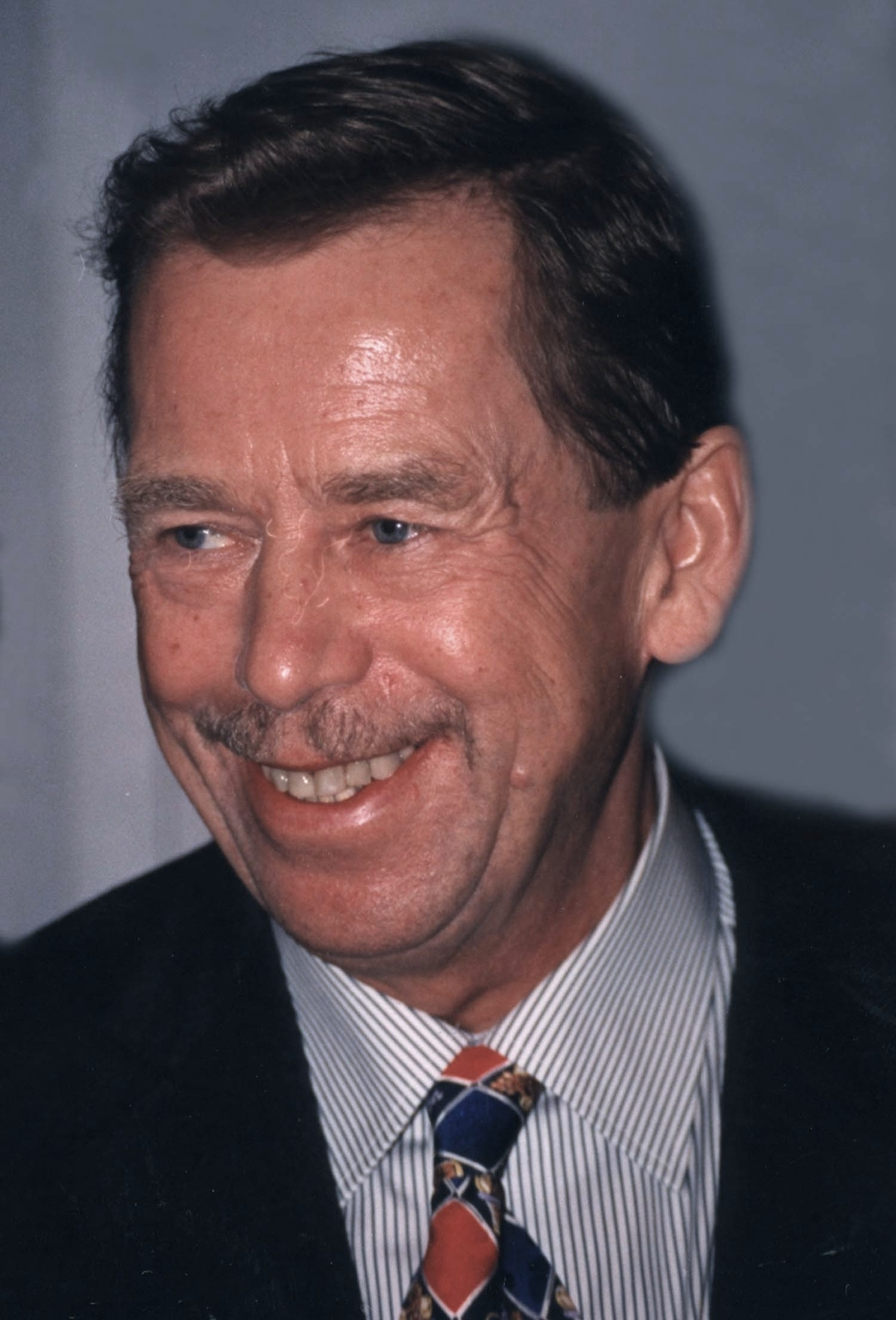
Václav Havel

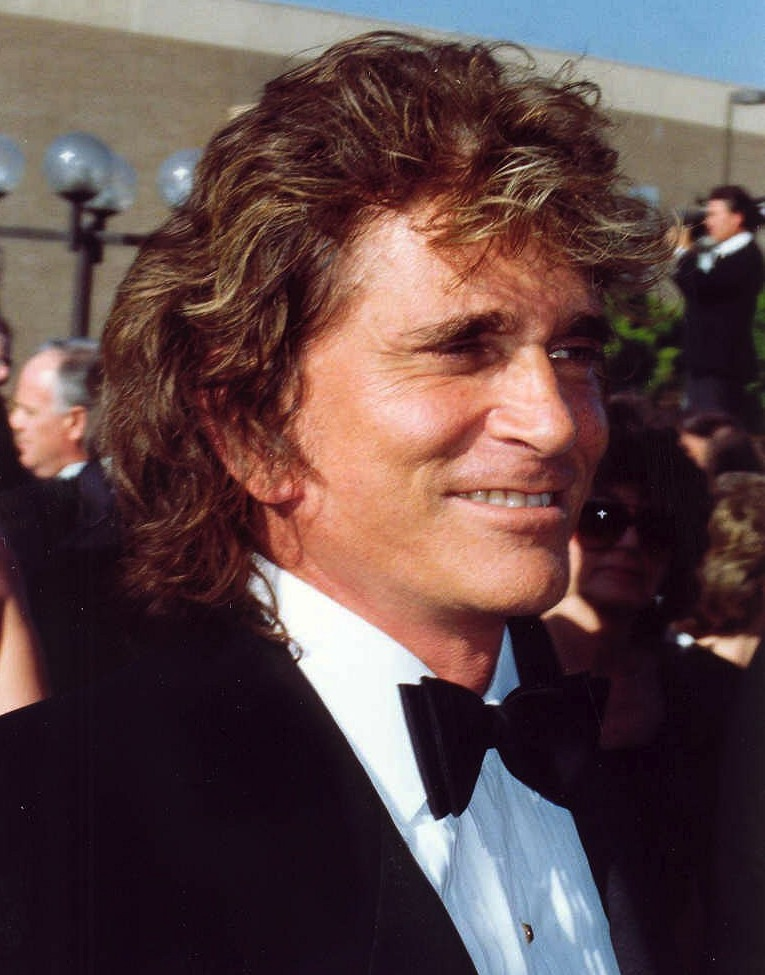
Michael Landon

- October 1 – Duncan Edwards, English footballer (d. 1958)
- October 2 – Gwen Marston, American quilter and writer (d. 2019)
- October 3 – Steve Reich, American composer
- October 5 – Václav Havel, Czech playwright, writer and politician, 10th President of Czechoslovakia and 1st President of the Czech Republic (d. 2011)
- October 6 – Lin Yu-lin, Taiwanese billionaire real estate developer (d. 2018)
- October 7 – Fereydoun Farrokhzad, Iranian entertainer (d. 1992)
- October 8 – Rogelio Guerra, Mexican actor (d. 2018)
- October 9 – Brian Blessed, English actor
- October 10 – Gerhard Ertl, German physicist, Nobel laureate
- October 11 – Tom Zé, Brazilian Tropicália singer-songwriter
- October 13 – Christine Nöstlinger, Austrian writer (d. 2018)
- October 16 – Andrei Chikatilo, Soviet serial killer (d. 1994)
- October 18 – Jaime Lucas Ortega y Alamino, Cuban cardinal (d. 2019)
- October 19
  - James Bevel, American civil rights movement strategist and leader (d. 2008)
  - Tony Lo Bianco, American actor (d. 2024)
- October 22 – Bobby Seale, American political activist
- October 24 – Bill Wyman, English rock guitarist
- October 25 – Masako Nozawa, Japanese actress and voice actress
- October 26 – Etelka Kenéz Heka, Hungarian writer, poet, singer (d. 2024)
- October 28 – Charlie Daniels, American country singer-songwriter (d. 2020)
- October 30
  - Polina Astakhova, Soviet artistic gymnast (d. 2005)
  - Luciano Tovoli, Italian cinematographer and filmmaker
  - Dick Vermeil, American former football coach
- October 31 – Michael Landon, American actor, director, producer and writer (d. 1991)

=== November ===
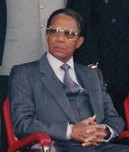
Didier Ratsiraka

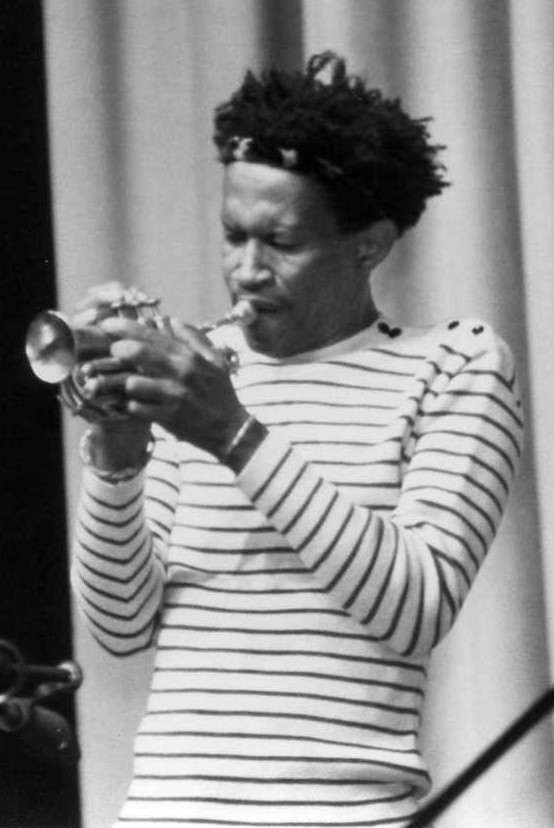
Don Cherry

- November 3 – Roy Emerson, Australian tennis player
- November 4
  - Didier Ratsiraka, 3rd President of Madagascar (d. 2021)
  - C. K. Williams, American poet (d. 2015)
- November 5
  - Ivan Stambolić, Serbian politician (d. 2000)
  - Uwe Seeler, German football player and manager (d. 2022)
- November 7 – Gwyneth Jones, Welsh soprano
- November 8 – Virna Lisi, Italian actress (d. 2014)
- November 9 – Mary Travers, American singer-songwriter (d. 2009)
- November 11 – Susan Kohner, American actress
- November 17
  - Dahlia Ravikovitch, Israeli poet (d. 2005)
  - Lazarus Salii, 3rd President of Palau (d. 1988)
- November 18
  - Ennio Antonelli, president of the Pontifical Council for the Family from 2008 to 2012.
  - Ante Žanetić, Croatian professional footballer (d. 2014)
- November 19 – Dick Cavett, American talk show host, television personality
- November 20 – Don DeLillo, American author
- November 22 – Sigmund R. Petersen, Norwegian-born American NOAA Commissioned Corps admiral (d. 2024)
- November 23 – Lazarus Salii, 3rd President of Palau (d. 1988)
- November 29 – Freddie Garrity, English singer and actor (d. 2006)
- November 30
  - Eric Walter Elst, Belgian astronomer (d. 2022)
  - Abbie Hoffman, American political and social activist (d. 1989)

=== December ===
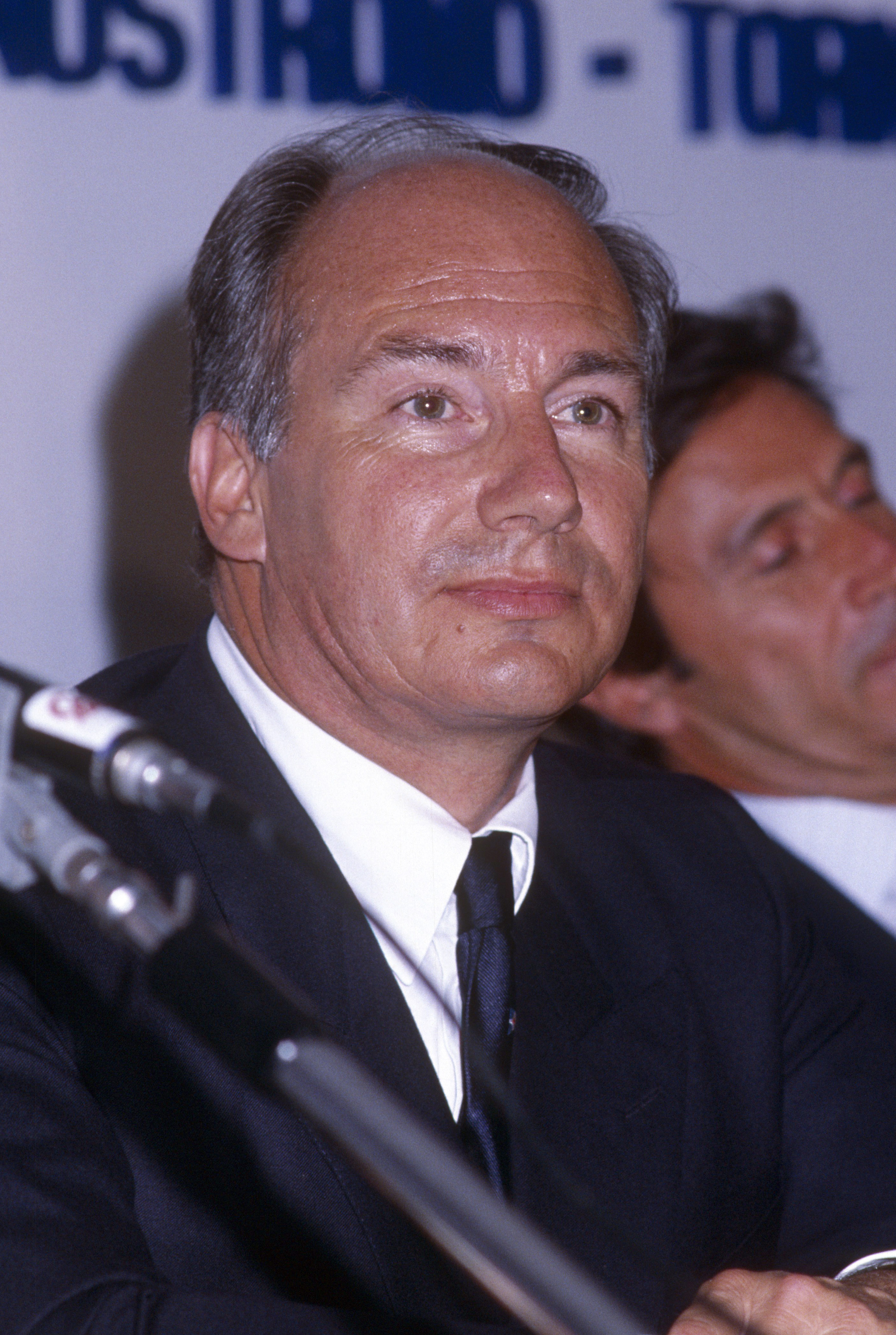
Aga Khan IV

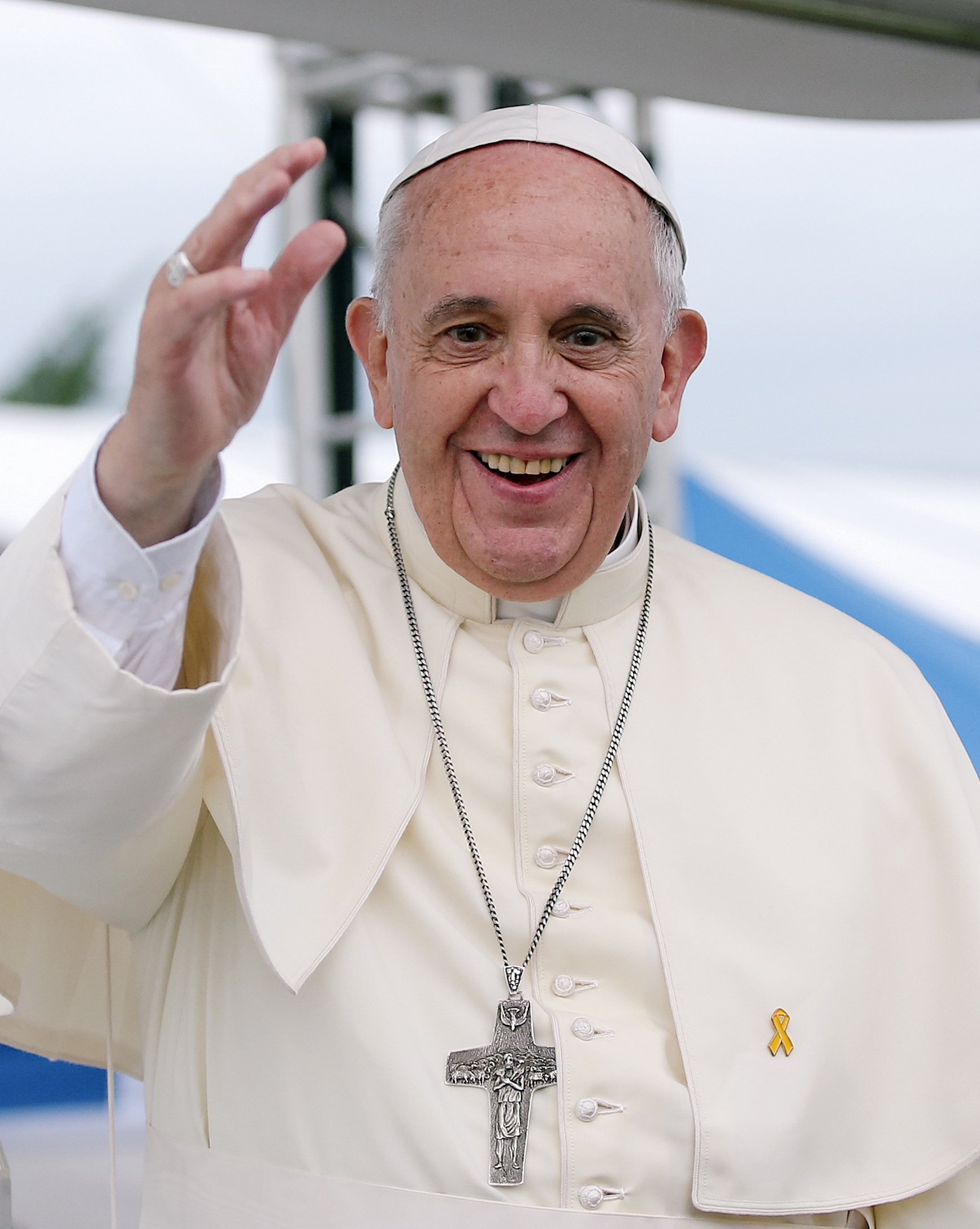
Pope Francis

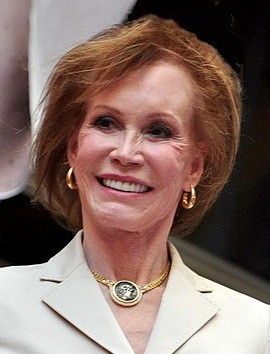
Mary Tyler Moore

- December 3 – Alfred Uhry. American playwright and screenwriter
- December 4 – América Alonso, Venezuelan actress (d. 2022)
- December 5 – James Lee Burke, American novelist
- December 6 – David Ossman, American writer and comedian
- December 6 – Kenneth Copeland, Minister
- December 7 – Martha Layne Collins, American businesswoman and politician (d. 2025)
- December 8 – David Carradine, American actor, director and martial artist (d. 2009)
- December 9 – A. B. Yehoshua, Israeli writer (d. 2022)
- December 11 – Hans van den Broek, Dutch politician and diplomat (d. 2025)
- December 12
  - Iolanda Balaș, Romanian high jumper (d. 2016)
  - Alain Cornu, French footballer (d. 2025)
- December 13 – Prince Karim Al-Husseini, Aga Khan IV, Swiss-born 49th imam of Nizari Isma'ilis, businessman, philanthropist and racehorse owner (d. 2025)
- December 14 – Robert A. Parker, American physicist, astronomer and astronaut
- December 15 – Walon Green, American documentary film director and screenwriter
- December 17
  - Pope Francis (d. 2025)
  - Klaus Kinkel, German politician (d. 2019)
  - Tommy Steele, British entertainer
- December 20 – Niki Bettendorf, Luxembourgish politician (d. 2018)
- December 21 – Barbara Roberts, American politician
- December 22 – Héctor Elizondo, American actor
- December 23
  - La Lupe, Cuban singer (d. 1992)
  - Bobby Ross, American football coach
- December 25
  - Princess Alexandra of Kent, The Honourable Lady Ogilvy, member of the British royal family
  - Ismail Merchant, Indian film director and producer (d. 2005)
- December 29 – Mary Tyler Moore, American actress, producer and diabetes awareness activist (d. 2017)
- December 31
  - Siw Malmkvist, Swedish singer
  - Bari Wood, American writer

== Deaths ==
=== January ===
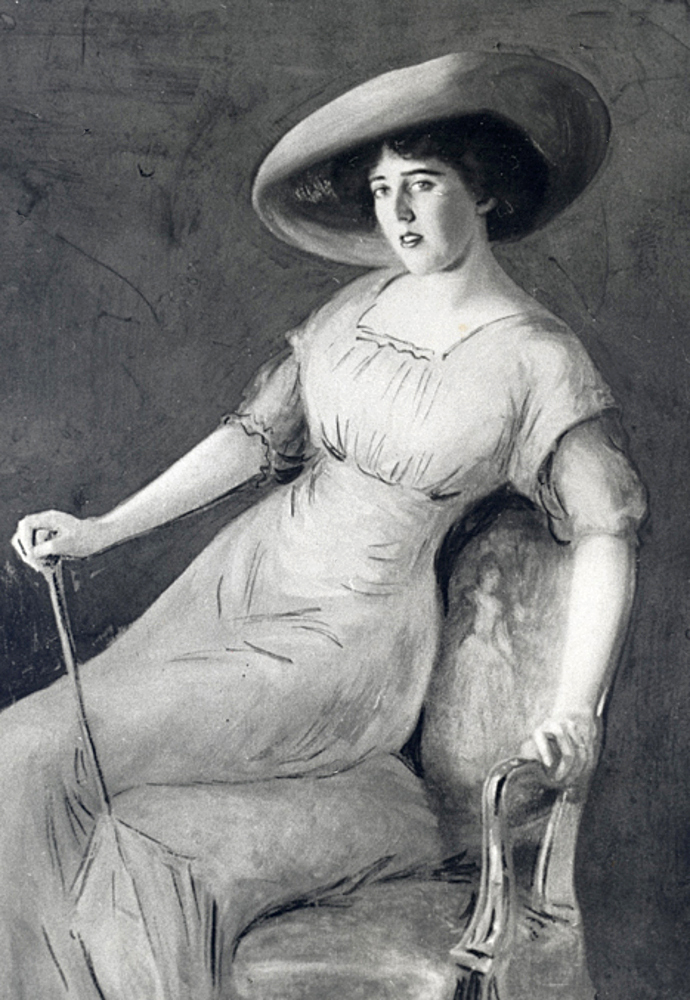
Louise Bryant

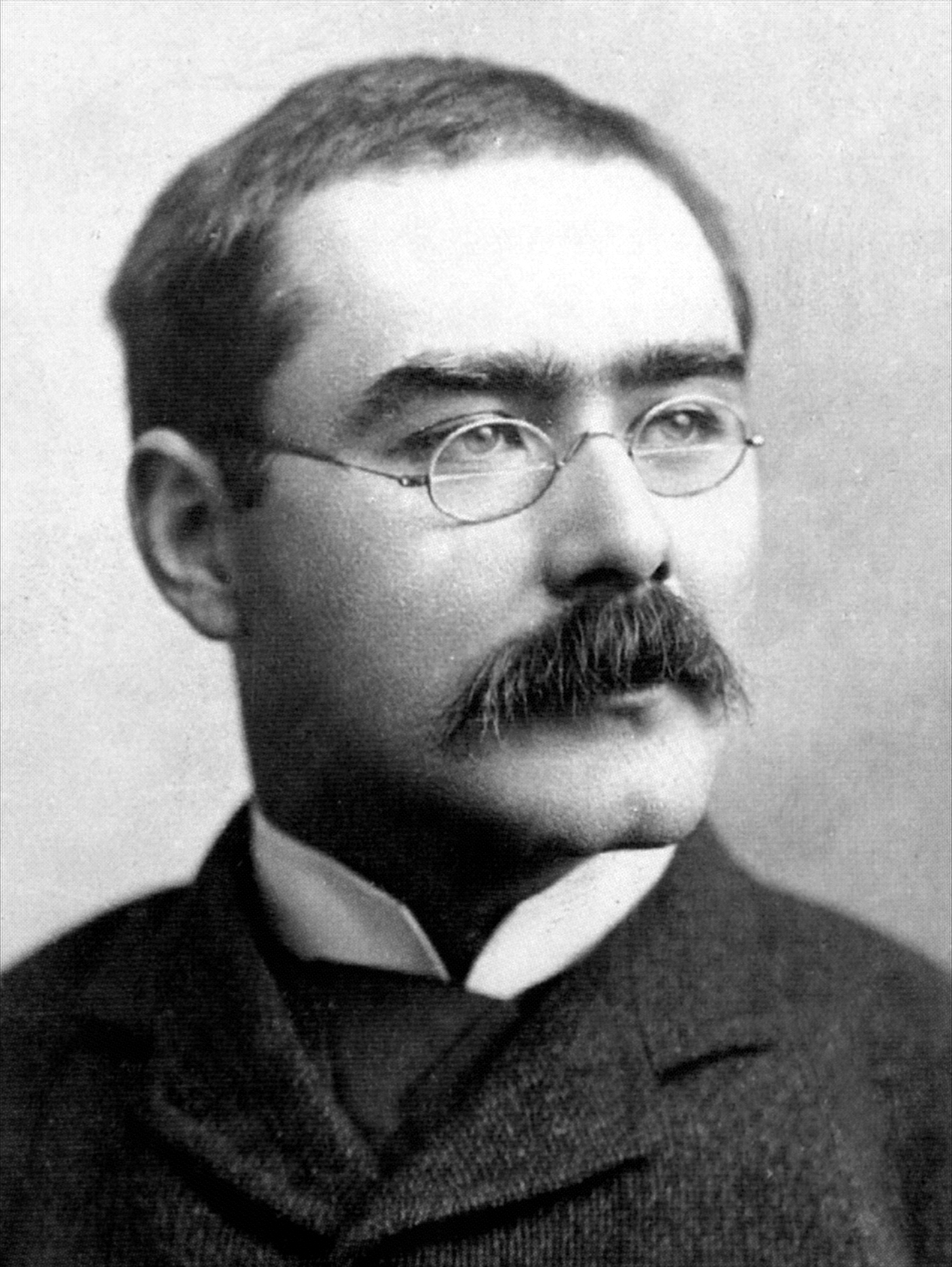
Rudyard Kipling

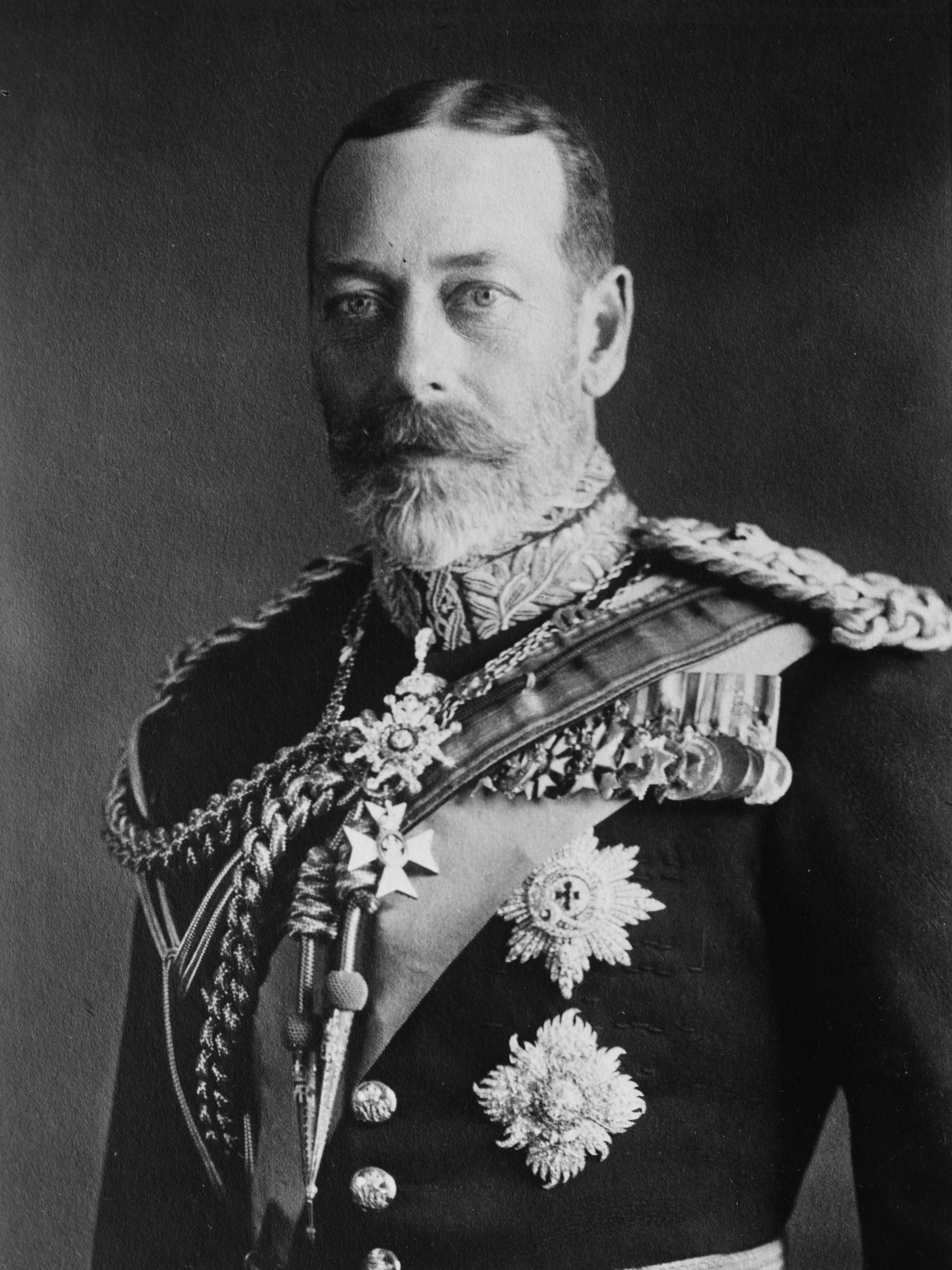
King George V of the United Kingdom

- January 1 – Harry B. Smith, American composer (b. 1860)
- January 5 – Ramón del Valle-Inclán, Spanish writer (b. 1866)
- January 6 – Louise Bryant, American journalist (b. 1885)
- January 9 – John Gilbert, American actor (b. 1897)
- January 15
  - Henry Foster, British Conservative Party politician, Governor-General of Australia (b. 1866)
  - George Landenberger, United States Navy Captain, 23rd Governor of American Samoa (b. 1879)
- January 16 – Albert Fish, American serial killer (executed) (b. 1870)
- January 18 – Rudyard Kipling, British writer, Nobel Prize laureate (b. 1865)
- January 20 – King George V of the United Kingdom (b. 1865)
- January 23 – John Mills Jr., "Mills Brothers" basso, guitarist (b. 1911)
- January 24
  - Harry T. Morey, American actor (b. 1873)
  - Harry Peach, British furniture manufacturer, social campaigner (b. 1874)
- January 28 – Richard Loeb, American murderer (b. 1905)

=== February ===
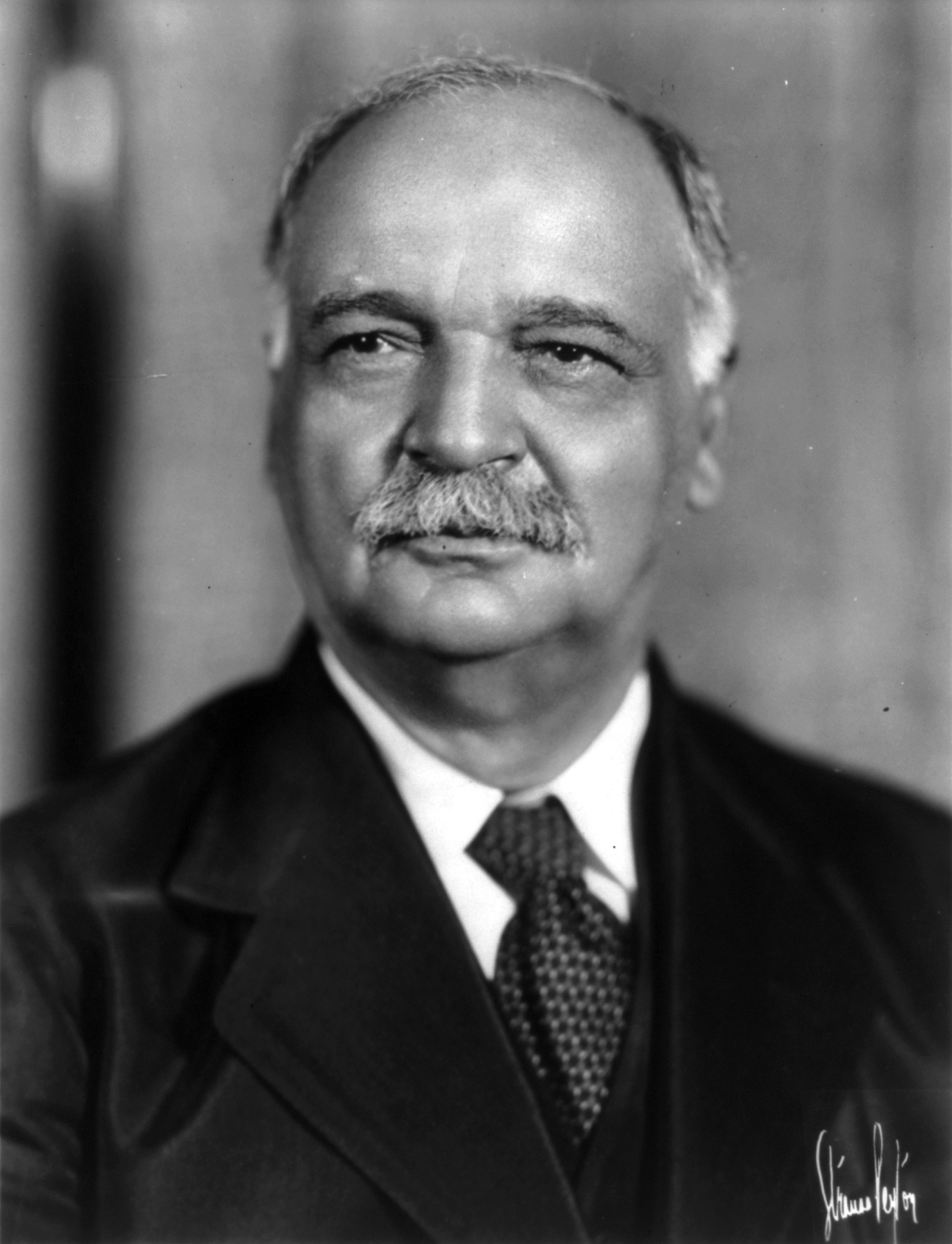
Charles Curtis

- February 3 – Sophie, Princess of Albania, consort of William of Wied, Prince of Albania (b.1885)
- February 4 – Wilhelm Gustloff, German leader of the Swiss Nazi Party (b. 1895)
- February 8 – Charles Curtis, 31st Vice President of the United States (b. 1860)
- February 19 – Billy Mitchell, American general, military aviation pioneer (b. 1879)
- February 20
  - Max Schreck, German actor (b. 1879)
  - Georges Vacher de Lapouge, French anthropologist (b. 1854)
- February 23 – William Adamson, British Labour politician (b. 1863)
- February 26 – in the "February 26 Incident":
  - Takahashi Korekiyo, 11th Prime Minister of Japan (b. 1854)
  - Saitō Makoto, Japanese admiral, 19th Prime Minister of Japan (b. 1858)
- February 27
  - Ivan Pavlov, Russian psychologist, recipient of the Nobel Prize in Physiology or Medicine (b. 1849)
  - Mulugeta Yeggazu, Ethiopian government official, military leader
- February 28 – Charles Nicolle, French bacteriologist, recipient of the Nobel Prize in Physiology or Medicine (b. 1866)

=== March ===
- March 8 – Jean Patou, French fashion designer (b. 1880)
- March 9 – Swami Sri Yukteswar Giri, Indian monk and yogi (b. 1855)
- March 12
  - David Beatty, 1st Earl Beatty, British admiral (b. 1871)
  - Sir David Campbell, British army general and Governor of Malta (b. 1869)
- March 13 – Sir Francis Bell, 20th Prime Minister of New Zealand (b. 1851)
- March 16
  - Dace Akmentiņa, Latvian actress (b. 1858)
  - Marguerite Durand, French journalist, feminist leader (b. 1864)
- March 18 – Eleftherios Venizelos, Greek statesman, several times Prime Minister (b. 1864)
- March 20 – Herman P. Faris, American temperance movement leader (b. 1858)
- March 21 – Alexander Glazunov, Russian composer, conductor (b. 1865)
- March 23 – Oscar Asche, Australian actor (b. 1871)
- March 28 – Sir Archibald Garrod, English physician (b. 1857)
- March 29 – Eugène Marais, South African lawyer, naturalist, poet and writer (b. 1871)

=== April ===
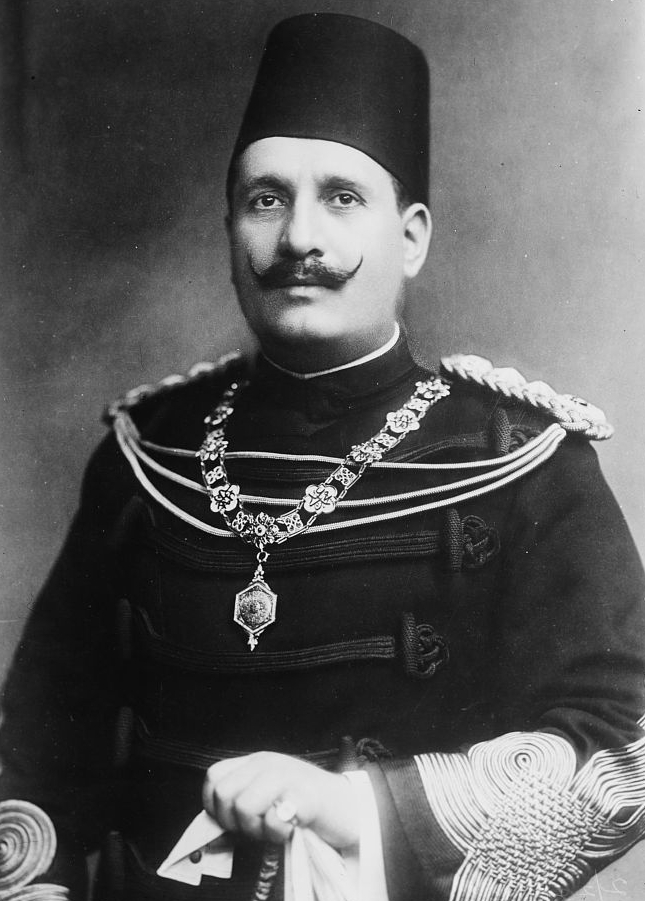
King Fuad I of Egypt

- April 2 – Alberico Albricci, Italian general (b. 1864)
- April 3 – Richard Hauptmann, German killer of Charles Lindbergh Jr. (executed) (b. 1899)
- April 6 – Edmund Breese, American actor (b. 1871)
- April 7 – Marilyn Miller, American actress (b. 1898)
- April 8 – Róbert Bárány, Austrian physician, recipient of the Nobel Prize in Physiology or Medicine (b. 1876)
- April 9 – Ferdinand Tönnies, German sociologist, economist and philosopher (b. 1855)
- April 18 – Ottorino Respighi, Italian composer, musicologist and conductor (b. 1879)
- April 23 – Teresa de la Parra, Venezuelan writer (b. 1889)
- April 25 – Wajed Ali Khan Panni, Bengali aristocrat and philanthropist (b. 1871)
- April 26 – Tammany Young, American actor (b. 1886)
- April 28 – King Fuad I of Egypt (b. 1868)
- April 30 – A. E. Housman, English poet (b. 1859)

=== May ===
- May 2 – Ivan Alexandrov, Russian engineer (b. 1875)
- May 4 – Ludwig von Falkenhausen, German general (b. 1844)
- May 5 – Marianne Hainisch, Austrian women's rights activist (b. 1839)
- May 8 – Oswald Spengler, German philosopher (b. 1880)
- May 12 – Hu Hanmin, Chinese politician (b. 1879)
- May 14 – Edmund Allenby, 1st Viscount Allenby, British soldier, administrator (b. 1861)
- May 16 – Leonidas Paraskevopoulos, Greek general, senator (b. 1860)
- May 17 – Panagis Tsaldaris, Prime Minister of Greece (b. 1868)
- May 24 – Khazʽal Ibn Jabir, Iranian sheikh (b. 1863)
- May 29 – Norman Chaney, American actor (b. 1914)

=== June ===
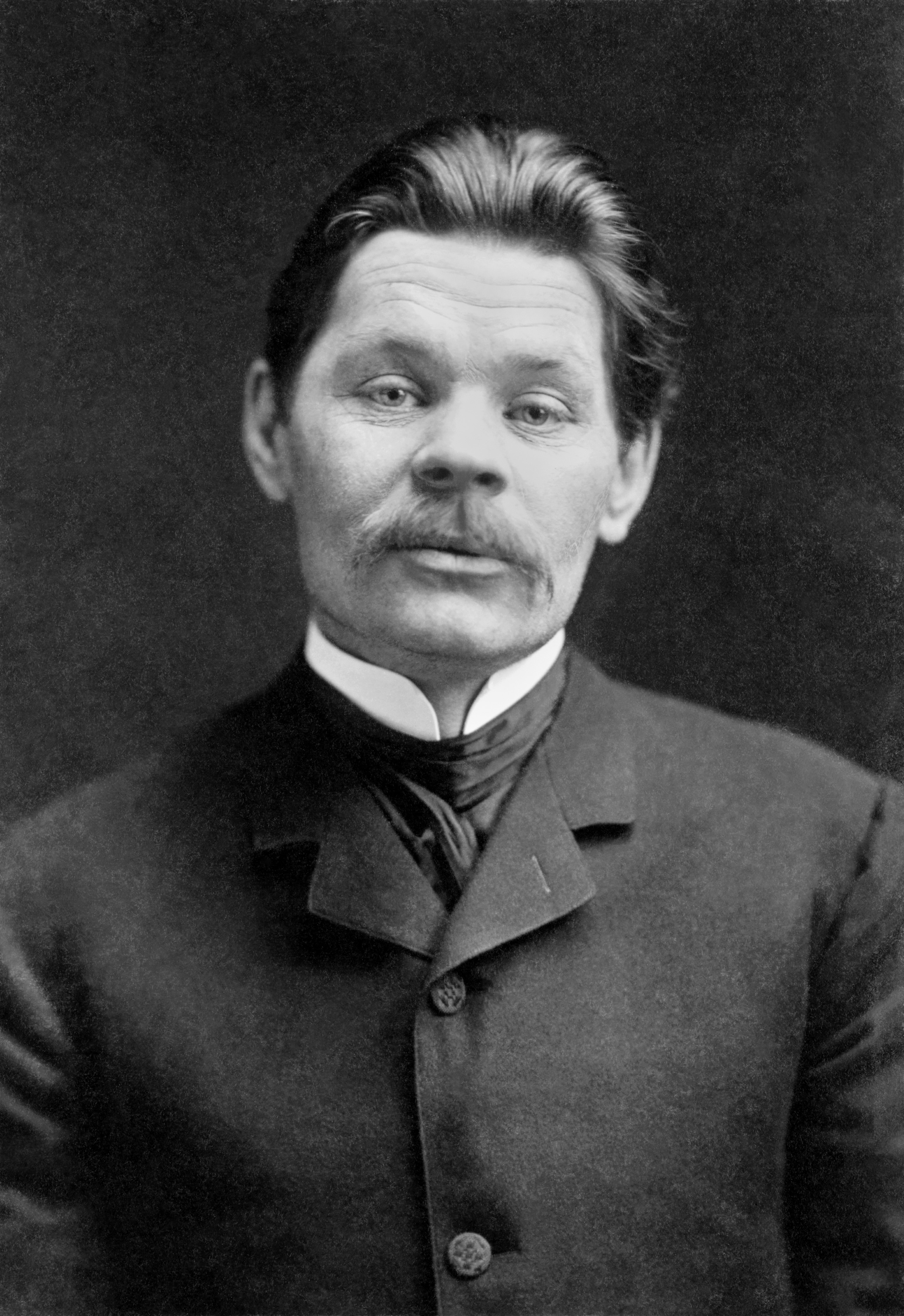
Maxim Gorky

- June 4 – Yvette Amice, French mathematician (d. 1993)
- June 11 – Robert E. Howard, American pulp fiction writer (suicide) (b. 1906)
- June 12
  - M. R. James, English medievalist scholar and author (b. 1862)
  - Karl Kraus, Austrian writer, journalist (b. 1874)
- June 14 – G. K. Chesterton, English author (b. 1874)
- June 17 – Henry B. Walthall, American actor (b. 1878)
- June 18 – Maxim Gorky, Russian writer (b. 1868)
- June 19 – Sir William Hall-Jones, English-New Zealand politician, 16th Prime Minister of New Zealand (b. 1851)
- June 22
  - Mary Haviland Stilwell Kuesel, American pioneer dentist (b. 1866)
  - Moritz Schlick, German philosopher, physicist (b. 1882)
- June 28 – Alexander Berkman, Russian anarchist (b. 1870)

=== July ===
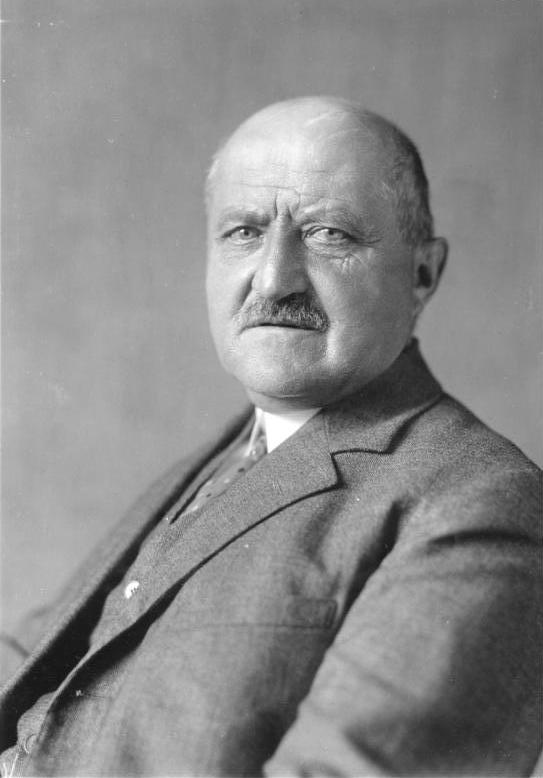
Georg Michaelis

- July 1 – Hovhannes Abelian, Armenian actor (b. 1865)
- July 8 – Thomas Meighan, American actor (b. 1879)
- July 9 – Auguste Adib Pacha, two-time prime minister of Lebanon (b. 1859)
- July 11 – James Murray, American actor (b. 1901)
- July 13
  - Kojo Tovalou Houénou, Beninese critic of the French colonial empire in Africa (b. 1887)
  - José Calvo Sotelo, Spanish politician (assassinated) (b. 1893)
- July 16 – Alan Crosland, American film director (b. 1894)
- July 23 – Anna Abrikosova, Soviet Roman Catholic religious sister and servant of God (b. 1882)
- July 24
  - Georg Michaelis, 6th Chancellor of Germany (b. 1857)
  - Sir Arnold Theiler, South African veterinary scientist (b. 1867)
- July 25 – Heinrich Rickert, German philosopher (b. 1863)

=== August ===
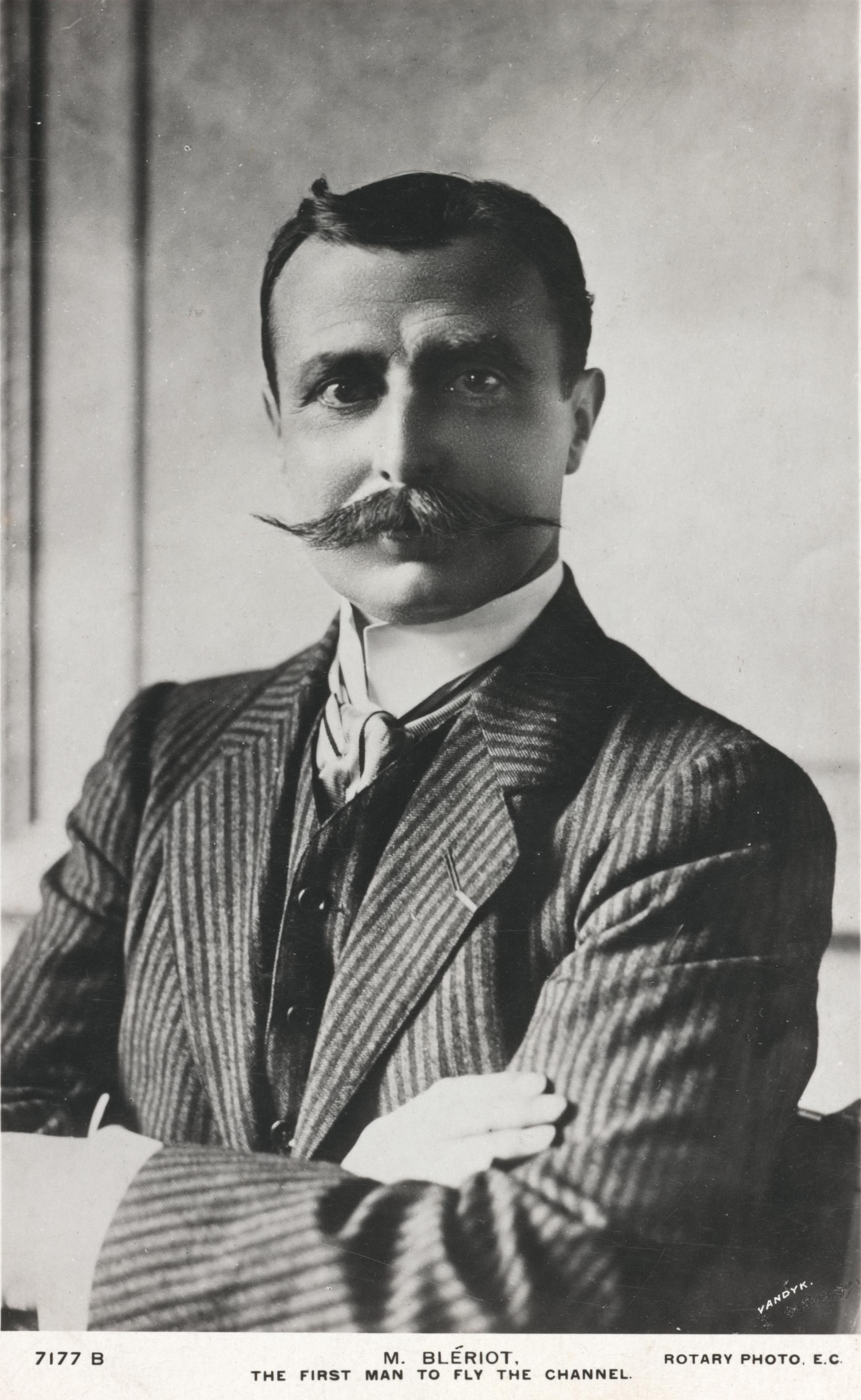
Louis Bleriot

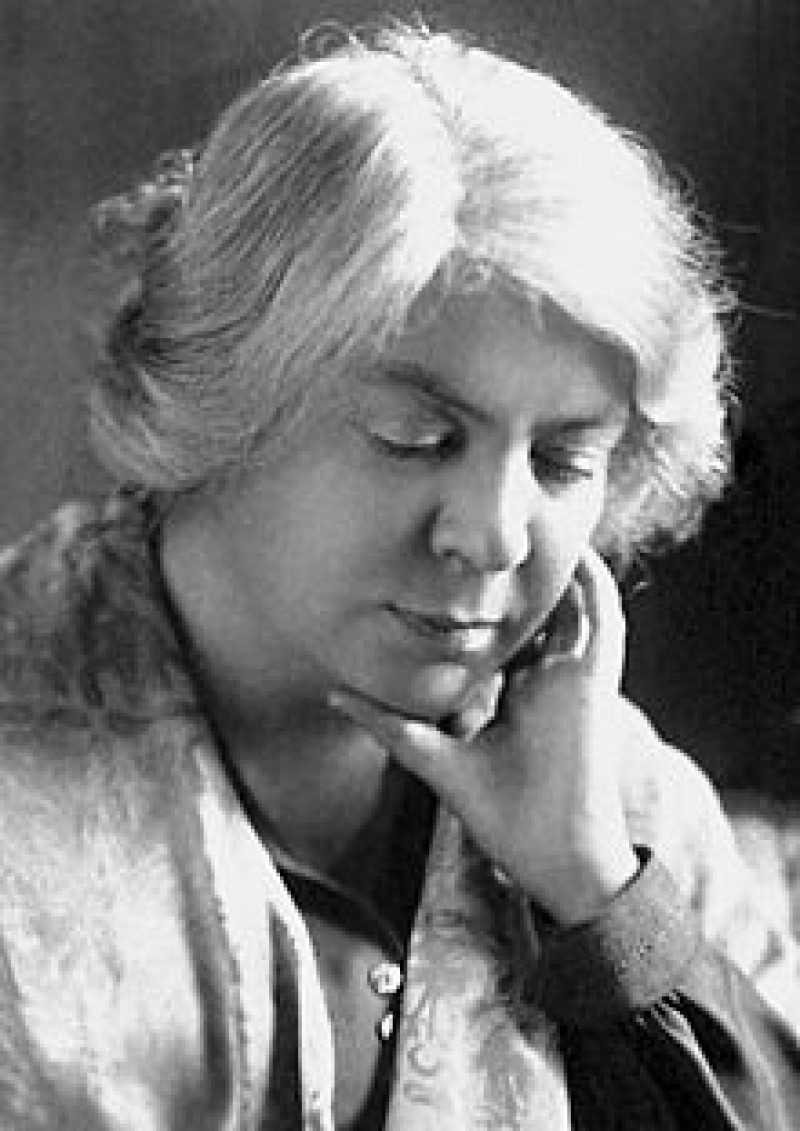
Grazia Deledda

- August 1 – Louis Blériot, French aviation pioneer (b. 1872)
- August 9 – Lincoln Steffens, American journalist (b. 1866)
- August 12 – Manuel Goded, Spanish general (executed) (b. 1882)
- August 15 – Grazia Deledda, Italian writer, Nobel Prize laureate (b. 1871)
- August 19
  - Federico García Lorca, Spanish writer (assassinated) (b. 1898)
  - Oscar von Sydow, 18th Prime Minister of Sweden (b. 1873)
- August 22 – José María Hinojosa, Spanish poet (assassinated) (b. 1904)
- August 23 – Julio Ruiz de Alda, Spanish aviator, Falangist politician (executed) (b. 1897)
- August 25
  - Ivan Nikitich Smirnov, Soviet Communist Party activist (b. 1881)
  - Lev Kamenev, Soviet politician (b. 1883)
  - Grigory Zinoviev, Soviet politician (b. 1883)

=== September ===
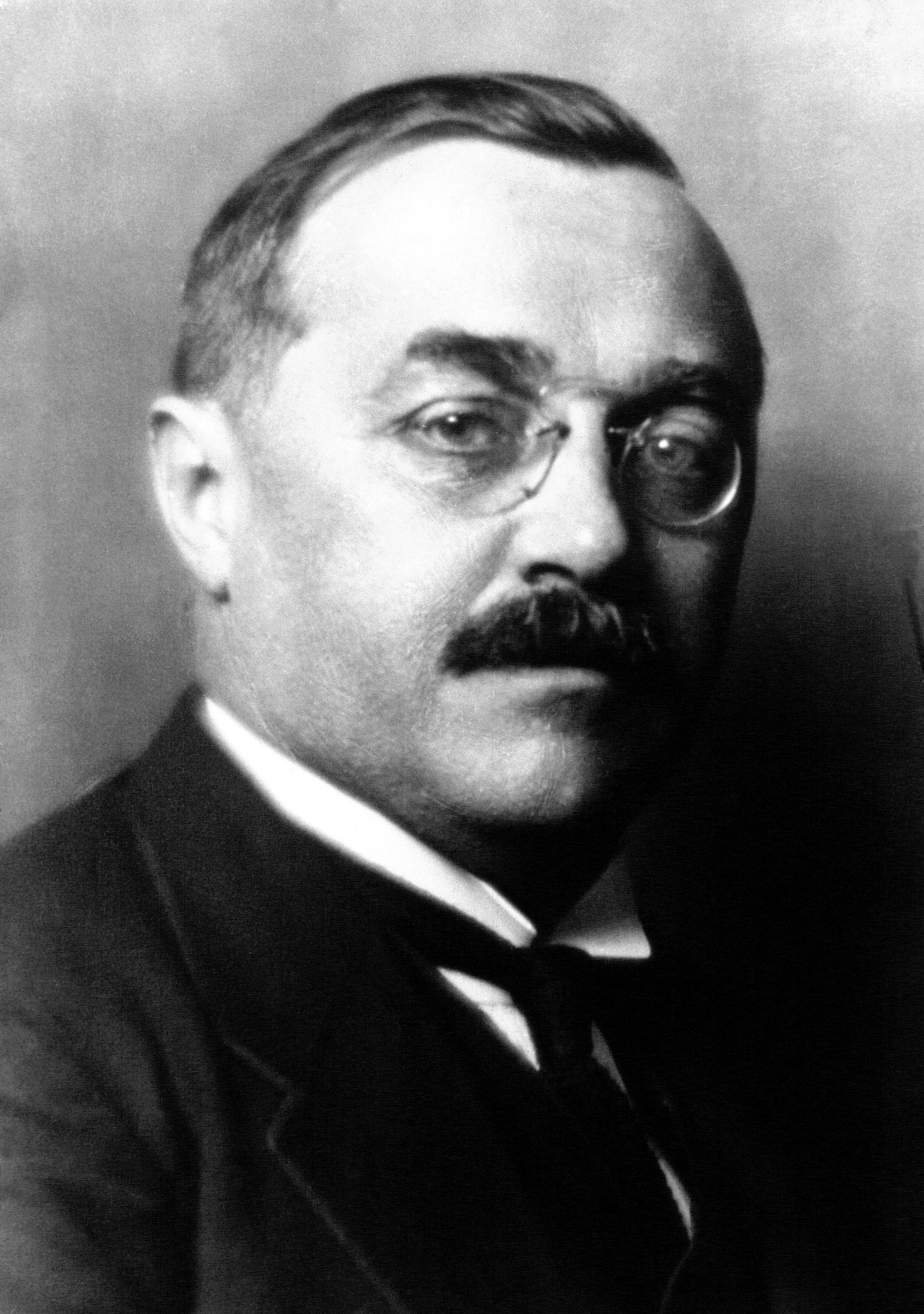
Karl Buresch

- September 6 – Víctor Pradera Larumbe, Spanish political theorist (executed) (b. 1872)
- September 7 – Kenneth Balfour, British Conservative Party politician (b. 1863)
- September 9 – Jerrold Immel, American television music composer
- September 14
  - Irving Thalberg, American film producer (b. 1899)
  - Raoul Villain, French assassin (b. 1885)
- September 16 – Karl Buresch, 9th Chancellor of Austria (b. 1878)
- September 17 – Henri Louis Le Chatelier, French chemist (Le Chatelier's principle) (b. 1850)
- September 19 – Vishnu Narayan Bhatkhande, Indian musician (b. 1860)
- September 21
  - Amalia Abad Casasempere, Spanish Roman Catholic laywoman, martyr (executed) (b. 1897)
  - Antoine Meillet, French linguist (b. 1866)
- September 28 – William Sims, American admiral (b. 1858)
- September 30 – Friedrich Sixt von Armin, German general (b. 1851)

=== October ===
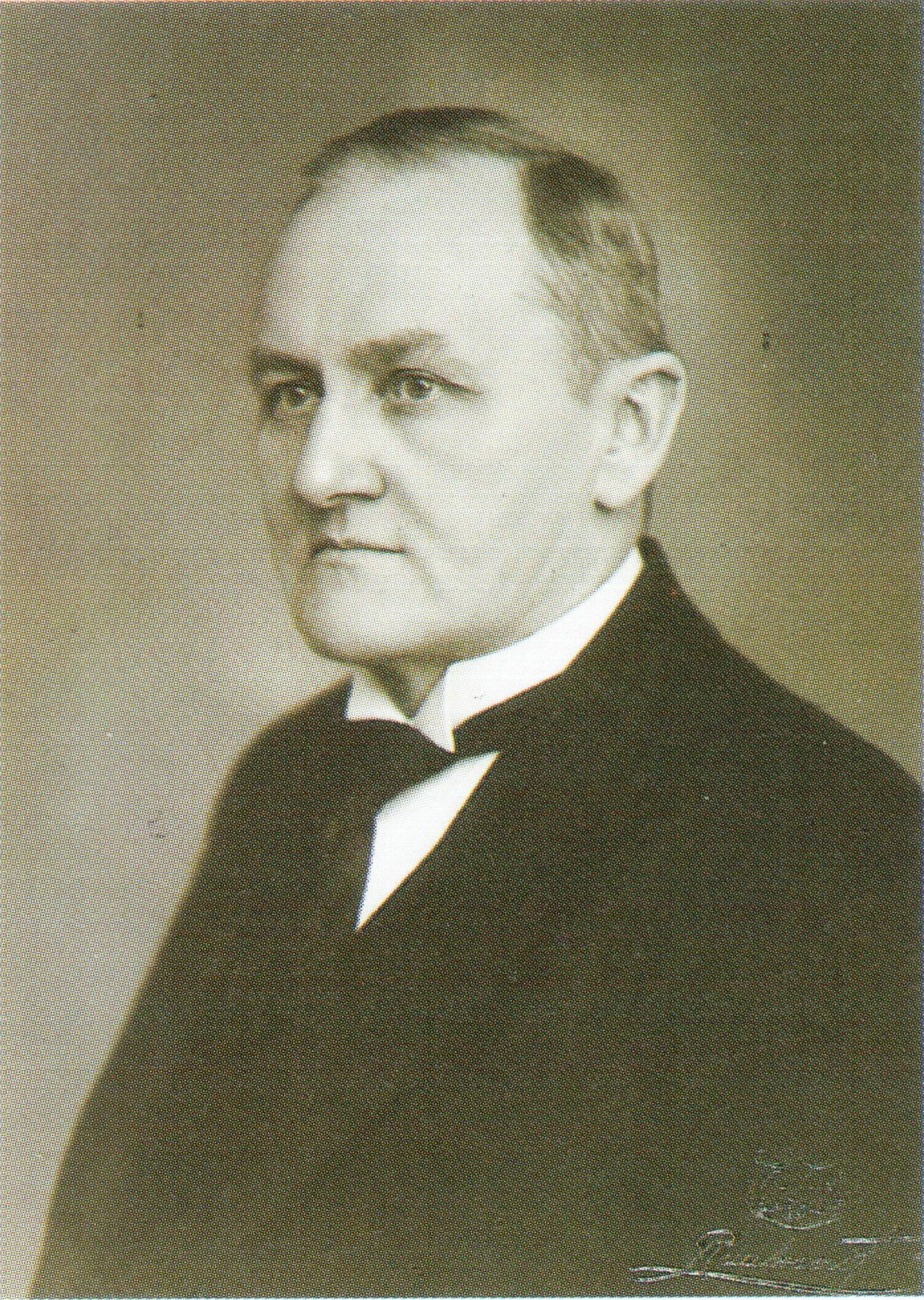
Juho Sunila

- October 2 – Juho Sunila, 2-time Prime Minister of Finland (b. 1875)
- October 3 – John Heisman, American football coach (b. 1869)
- October 6 – Gyula Gömbös, 30th Prime Minister of Hungary (b. 1886)
- October 8
  - Cheiro, Irish astrologer (b. 1866)
  - William Henry Stark, American businessman (b. 1851)
- October 10 - Abul Kasem, Bengali politician (b. 1872)
- October 12
  - Félix Julien, French footballer (b. 1884)
  - Shuja ul-Mulk, Indian ruler (b. 1881)
- October 16 – Effie Adelaide Rowlands, British novelist (b. 1859)
- October 19 – Lu Xun, leading figure of modern Chinese literature (b. 1881)
- October 20 – Anne Sullivan, American teacher of Helen Keller (b. 1866)
- October 26 – Rodney Heath, Australian tennis player (b. 1884)
- October 29 – Ramiro de Maeztu, Spanish writer (assassinated) (b. 1875)

=== November ===
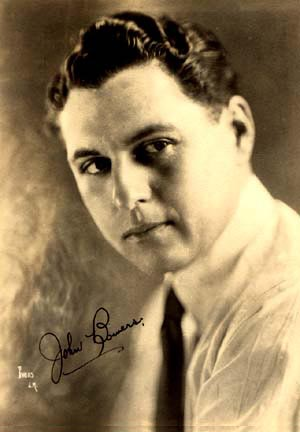
John Bowers

- November 2 – Martin Lowry, English physical chemist (b. 1874)
- November 7
  - Walter L. Finn, American physician and politician (b. 1875)
  - Charles "Chic" Sale, American vaudevillian (b. 1885)
- November 11 – Sir Edward German, English composer (b. 1862)
- November 17
  - John Bowers, American actor (b. 1885)
  - Alexandros Papanastasiou, 2-time prime minister of Greece (b. 1876)
- November 20
  - Buenaventura Durruti, Spanish anarchist (b. 1896)
  - José Antonio Primo de Rivera, Spanish fascist politician (executed) (b. 1903)
- November 24 – Mateo García de los Reyes, Spanish admiral and minister of the navy, organizer and first chief of the Spanish Navy submarine force (executed) (b. 1872)
- November 25 – Andrew Harper, Scottish–Australian biblical scholar, teacher (b. 1844)
- November 27 – Edward Bach, British physician, homeopath and bacteriologist (b. 1886)

=== December ===
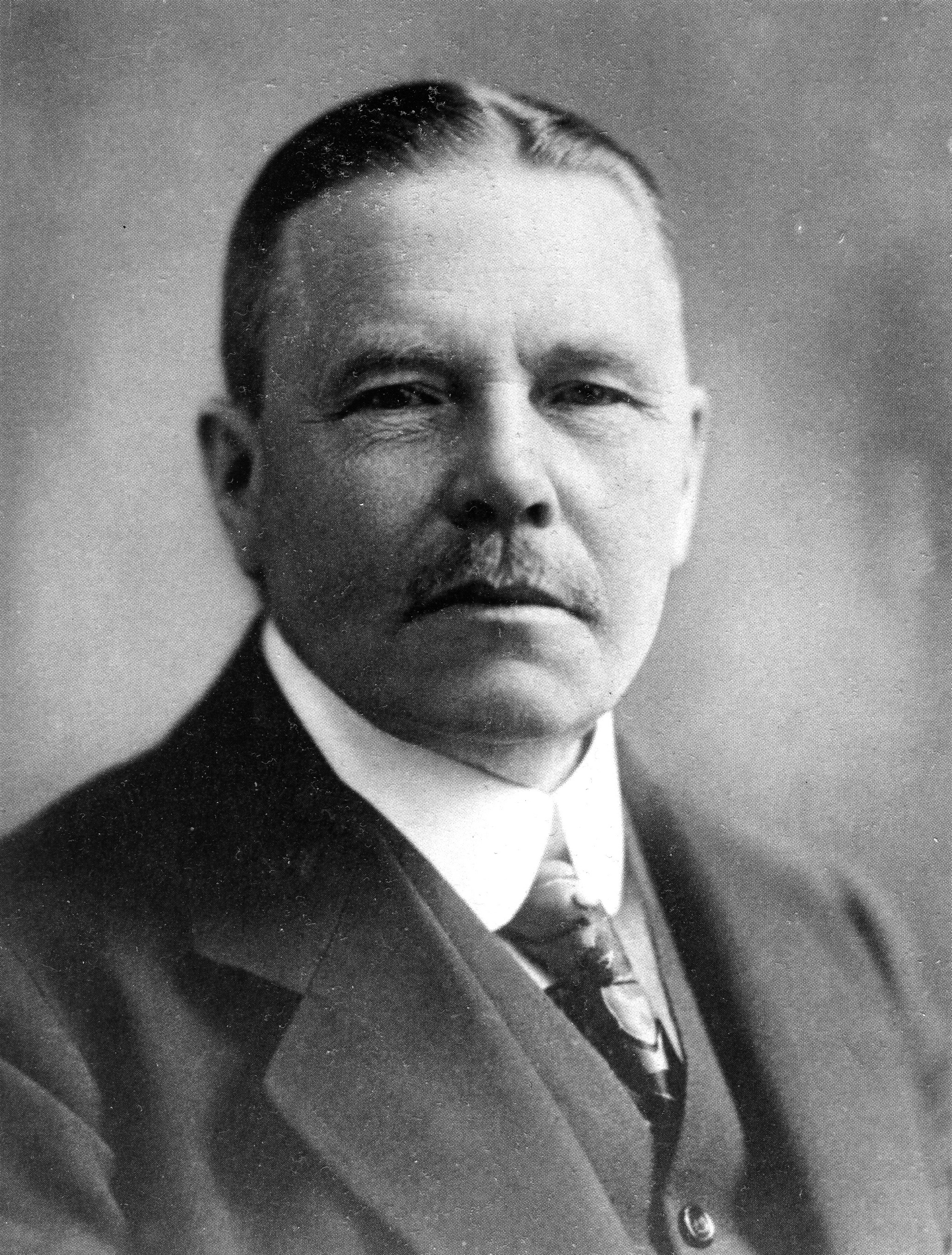
Arvid Lindman

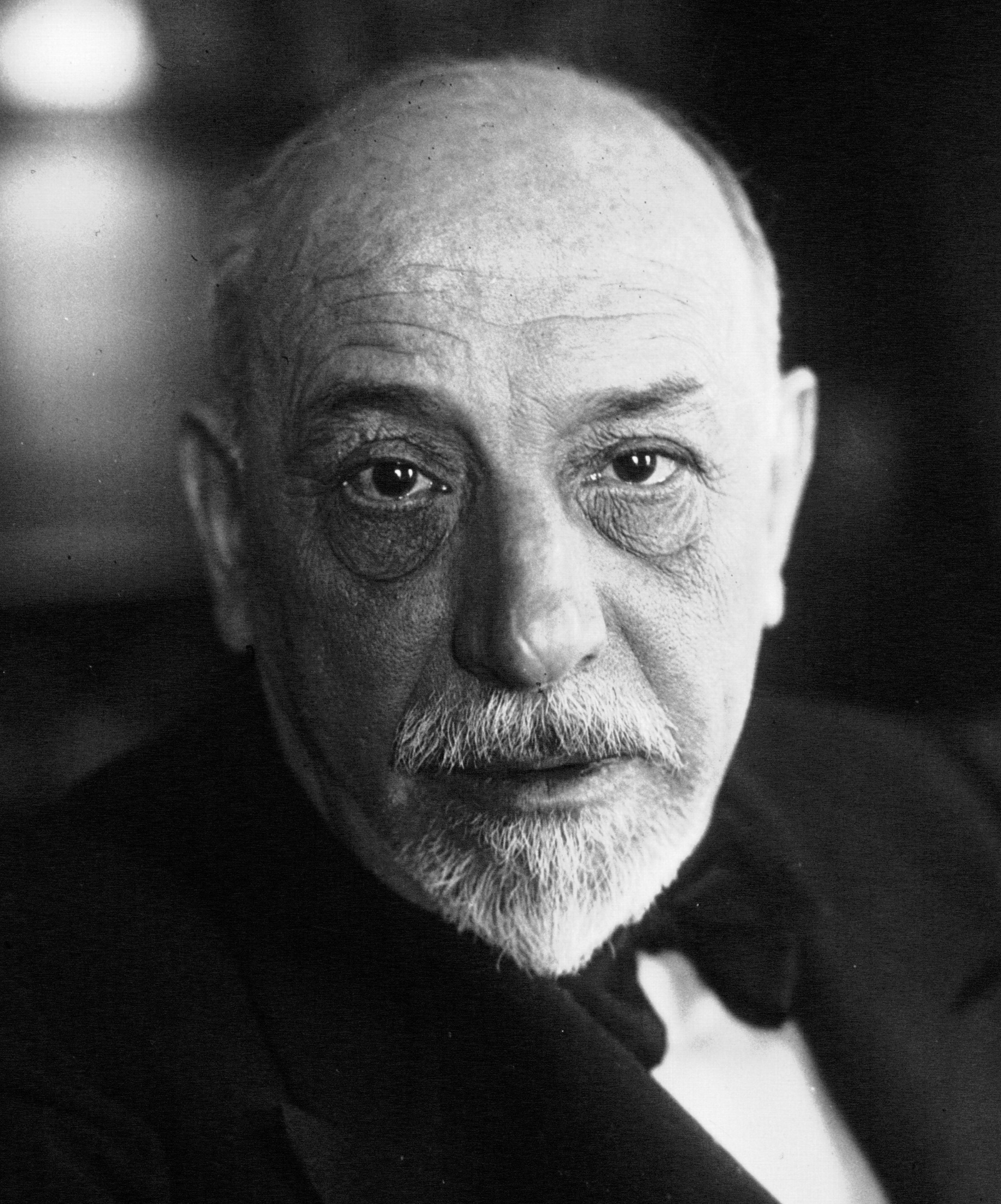
Luigi Pirandello

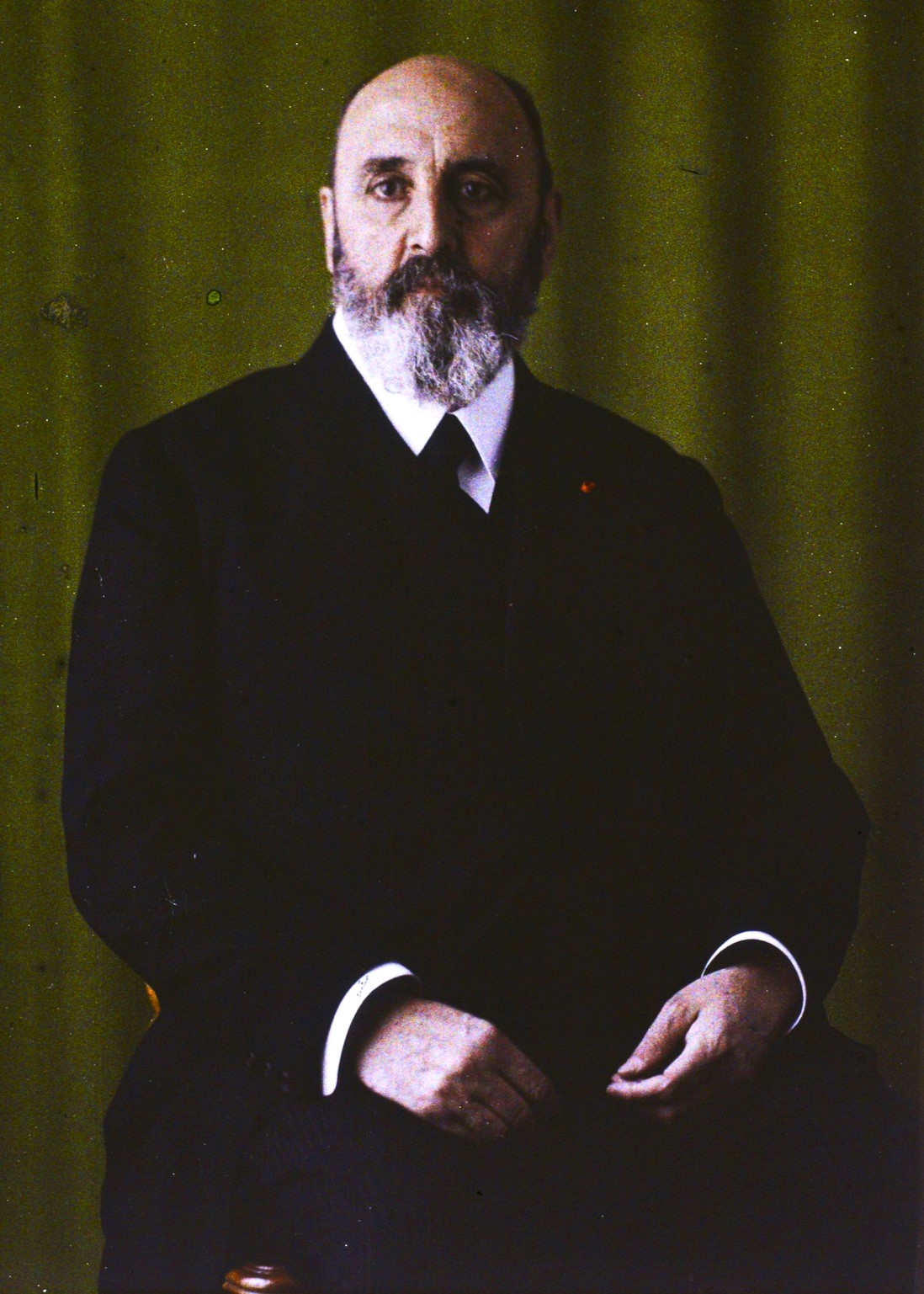
Leonardo Torres Quevedo

- December 7 – Jean Mermoz, French aviator (b. 1901)
- December 9
  - Juan de la Cierva, Spanish civil engineer, aviator and aeronautical engineer, inventor of the autogyro (b. 1895)
  - Arvid Lindman, 12th Prime Minister of Sweden (b. 1862)
  - Lottie Pickford, Canadian actress (b. 1895)
- December 10
  - Bobby Abel, English cricketer (b. 1857)
  - Luigi Pirandello, Italian dramatist, Nobel Prize laureate (b. 1867)
- December 18 – Leonardo Torres Quevedo, Spanish engineer, a pioneer of computing and radio control, inventor of El Ajedrecista (The Chess Player) (b. 1852)
- December 23, William Henry Harrison, English cricketer (b. 1866)
- December 24 – Irene Fenwick, American actress (b. 1887)
- December 25 – Carl Stumpf, German philosopher and psychologist (b. 1848)
- December 26 – Percival G. Baldwin, American politician and businessman (b. 1880)
- December 27 – Hans von Seeckt, German general (b. 1866)
- December 29 – Lucy, Lady Houston, British philanthropist (b. 1857)
- December 31 – Miguel de Unamuno, Spanish writer (b. 1864)

== Nobel Prizes ==

- Physics – Victor F. Hess, Carl D. Anderson
- Chemistry – Petrus (Peter) Josephus Wilhelmus Debye
- Physiology or Medicine – Sir Henry Hallett Dale, Otto Loewi
- Literature – Eugene Gladstone O'Neill
- Peace – Carlos Saavedra Lamas
