= First Lady of Tunisia =

Wife of the president of Tunisia

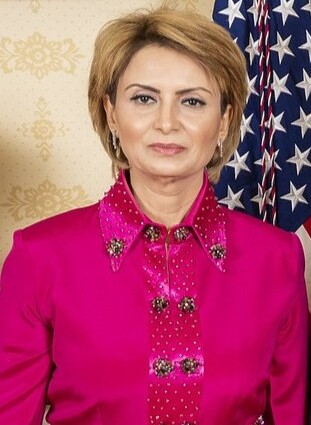
- Incumbent; Ichraf Saied since October 23, 2019
- Style: Madame; Mrs. Saied
- Residence: Carthage Palace
- Term length: Five years, renewable once
- Inaugural holder: Moufida Bourguiba
- Formation: July 25, 1957

First Lady of Tunisia (Arabic: سيدة تونس الأولى, French: Première dame de Tunisie) usually refers to the wife of the president of Tunisia. They often play a protocol role at the Carthage Palace and during official visits, though possess no official title. Ichraf Saied is the spouse of the current president, Kais Saied, who took office on 23 October 2019. It is not a public office nor an official title.

== First ladies of Tunisia ==
Name	Portrait	Term begins	Term ends	President of Tunisia	Notes
Moufida Bourguiba		25 July 1957	21 July 1961 (Divorced)	Habib Bourguiba	Born in France as Mathilde Lorrain, Bourguiba was the inaugural First Lady of Tunisia from independence in 1957 until her divorce from President Habib Bourguiba, which was announced on 21 July 1961.
Position Vacant		21 July 1961	12 April 1962	Habib Bourguiba	
Wassila Bourguiba		12 April 1962 (Married)	11 August 1986 (Divorced)	Habib Bourguiba	President Bourguiba married Wassila Ben Ammar on 12 April 1962. Wassila Bourguiba wielded considerable influence in Tunisian politics during her later years as first lady. The couple divorced in 1986 after 24 years of marriage. Their divorce was announced by the government on 11 August 1986.
Position Vacant		11 August 1986	7 November 1987	Habib Bourguiba	
Naïma Ben Ali		7 November 1987	1988 (Divorced)	Zine El Abidine Ben Ali	Naïma Ben Ali and President Ben Ali, who had married in 1964, divorced in 1988.
Position Vacant		1988	26 March 1992	Zine El Abidine Ben Ali	President Ben Ali and his first wife, then-first lady Naïma Ben Ali, divorced in 1988. Prior to the divorce, President Ben Ali had a daughter out-of-wedlock with Leïla Trabelsi in 1987. President Ben Ali moved Trabelsi into Carthage Palace on November 7, 1987, but they remained unmarried until 1992.
Leïla Ben Ali		26 March 1992 (Married)	15 January 2011	Zine El Abidine Ben Ali	Leïla Ben Ali married President Zine El Abidine Ben Ali on 26 March 1992, making her the official first lady. Prior to the wedding, Leïla Ben Ali had lived with President Ben Ali at the presidential palace since 1987.
Lilia Mebazaa		15 January 2011	13 December 2011	Fouad Mebazaa	
Beatrix Marzouki		13 December 2011	31 December 2014	Moncef Marzouki	Of French origin
Chadlia Saïda Farhat		31 December 2014	25 July 2019	Beji Caid Essebsi	
Siren Ennaceur		25 July 2019	23 October 2019	Mohamed Ennaceur	Of Norwegian origin
Ichraf Saied		23 October 2019		Kais Saied	
