= Slim Chiboub =

Tunisian businessman (born 1959)

- Born: January 13, 1959 (age 66)
- Occupation: Businessman
- Known for: Chairmanship of Espérance Sportive de Tunis from 1989 to 2004

Slim Chiboub (born 13 January 1959) is a Tunisian businessman. He is married to Dorsaf Ben Ali, the oldest daughter of former Tunisian President Zine El Abidine Ben Ali and his first wife, Naïma Kefi. He claims he has not seen Ben Ali since the latter married Leïla Ben Ali.

== Biography ==
He was club president of Espérance Sportive de Tunis for fifteen years. He is a former member of the executive committee of FIFA. He used to chair the Tunisian Olympic Committee until he fell, after the 2011 revolution. He also owns race horses.

Following the 2010–2011 Tunisian protests, he was in Libya and then in United Arab Emirates.

As of December 2021, Chiboub is still in prison for the Marina Gamart case, in which he is facing accusations of buying land for a price cheaper than its market value, thanks to his close ties to Ben Ali, and the then ruling class.
