= Ichraf Saied =

Wife of Tunisian president Kais Saied (born 1973)

Ichraf Saïed
- إشراف سعيد
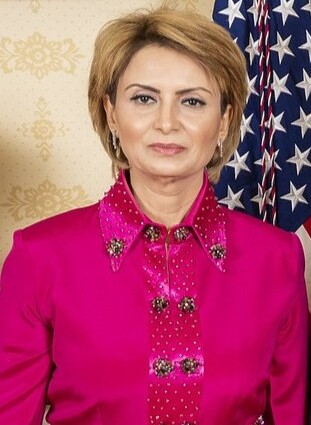
- Saïed in December 2022

First Lady of Tunisia
- Incumbent
- Assumed office 23 October 2019
- President: Kais Saied
- Preceded by: Siren Ennaceur

Personal details
- Born: Ichraf Chebil; 1973 (age 52–53) Sfax, Tunisia
- Spouse: Kais Saied
- Children: 3
- Education: University of Sousse
- Profession: Magistrate

Ichraf Saïed (Arabic: إشراف سعيد; née Chebil [شبيل]; born 1973) is a Tunisian magistrate who has been the First Lady of Tunisia since 23 October 2019, as the wife of Kaïs Saïed, following his election to the presidency of the republic. She is the ninth first lady of Tunisia and the fifth first lady of the post-Tunisian Revolution era.

== Biography ==
Ichraf was born in Sfax, but her family is originally from Téboulba, a coastal town in the Tunisian Sahel region of Monastir Governorate. Her father, Mohamed Chebil, was a judge in the Tunis Court of Appeals. She is also a descendent of Saint Ali Chebil.

She studied in Sousse, first at a French school in Sousse and then at the lycée Tahar-Sfar. After receiving her bachelor's degree, Saïed studied law at the Faculty of Law and Political Science at the University of Sousse. She holds a degree in criminal studies from the Higher Institute of the Magistrate and subsequently became an advisor to the Court of Appeals and the Court of First Instance of Tunis.

She met her husband, Kaïs Saïed, while she was a law student in Sousse and taught him constitutional law. They have declared that their marriage was not a marriage arranged by their families. According to a social media post by Kaïs Karoui, a close friend of Kaïs Saïed, "The whole outlook of Kais Saïed is modernist and...neither his wife nor his daughter are veiled, not to mention that his wife is a magistrate." The couple have three children – Amrou, Sarah and Mouna.

Saïed's first appearance as First Lady took place on the day of her husband's inauguration as President of the Republic, at the reception at Carthage Palace. A few days later, Ichraf Saïed announced she was retiring, out of respect for the independence of the judiciary, from her position as a magistrate, without a monthly salary, for a period of five years, the duration of her husband's term of office.

She appears publicly on official occasions, such as on 13 August 2020 during National Women's Day celebrations, and on 3 June 2021 with the royal couple of Belgium in Brussels. However, she rarely appears in the media, in contrast with the wives of other former Tunisian presidents.

In September 2021, the president of the Superior Council of the Judiciary, Youssef Bouzakher, remarked on Shems FM that Saïed continues to practice law, contrary to what was originally announced at the beginning of her husband's mandate. Saïed was promoted as a third-grade judge and assigned to the Court of Appeals of Sfax, which she declined. A November 2021 statement from the Council of the Judicial Order noted that she would be appointed to the Center for Legal and Judicial Studies of Tunis.
