= Jadia Osman =

Sudanese TV presenter

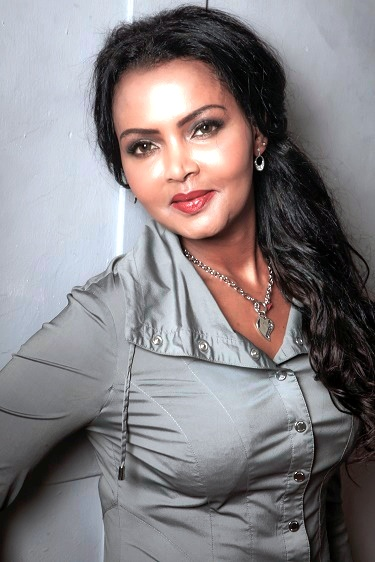
- Occupation: Television presenter

Jadia Osman (جدية عثمان) is a TV presenter from Sudan. She works in London as a reporter and television presenter for Al Ghad Alarabi and the MBC, (Middle East Broadcast Channel), MBC/Alarabiya London Office.

Jadia is the founder of the Arab International Media Center AIMC, an international production company.

She obtained a Level 3 Diploma in Media Techniques (Video Production) from the City Of Westminster College. She also had courses in Broadcast Presentation at London Metropolitan University.

Her most popular programs involved variety late show programs, open and live cultural and variety programs, special programs in Ramadan and other festivities, live and recorded public interviews in Sudan TV, Bahrain Radio and Television Corporation, Blue Nile Channel, Al Ghad Alarabi and MBC.

She is an active member of the Arab International Women's Forum and Sudanese Community Council in UK & Ireland.
