= Chadlia Farhat Essebsi =

Wife of Tunisian president Beji Caid Essebsi

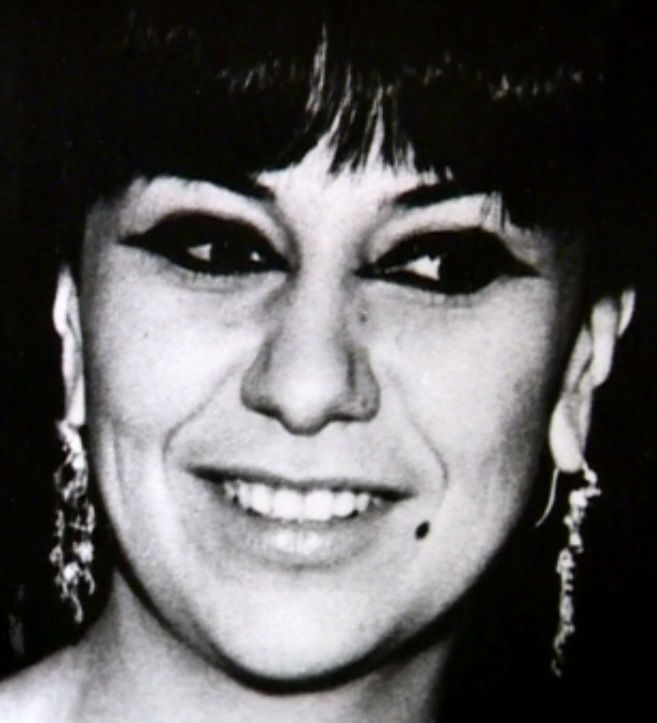
- Chadlia Saïda Farhat during the 1950s

First Lady of Tunisia
- In office 31 December 2014 – 25 July 2019
- President: Beji Caid Essebsi
- Preceded by: Béatrix Marzouki
- Succeeded by: Siren Ennaceur

Personal details
- Born: Chadlia Saïda Farhat; 1 August 1936 Tunis, Tunisia
- Died: 15 September 2019 (aged 83) Tunis, Tunisia
- Spouse: Beji Caid Essebsi (m. 1958; died 2019)
- Children: 4

Chadlia Saïda Farhat Essebsi (Arabic: شاذلية سعيدة فرحات السبسي; 1 August 1936 – 15 September 2019) was the First Lady of Tunisia (2014–2019) as the wife of President Beji Caid Essebsi. She was Tunisia's fifth first lady, as well as the second, following the Tunisian Revolution.

== Biography ==
Farhat was born on 1 August 1936. She married Beji Caid Essebsi, a lawyer and politician eleven years her senior, on 8 February 1958. The couple had four children: two daughters- Amel and Salwa, and two sons- Mohamed Hafedh and Khélil.

Farhat Essebsi became First Lady of Tunisia on 31 December 2014 upon the inauguration of her husband as president. She reportedly disliked the idea of moving to Carthage Palace, the official Presidential Palace, as it was at a distance from her family. As first lady, she assumed a higher profile, both in public and behind-the-scenes, than her immediate predecessor, first lady Béatrix Marzouki.

== Death ==
Farhat Essebsi died of a heart attack on 15 September 2019, aged 83, less than two months after her husband, and on the same day a national election to determine President Essebsi's permanent successor, was held.

Honorary titles
Preceded by Béatrix Marzouki	First Lady of Tunisia; 2014–2019	Succeeded by Siren Ennaceur
