= Fountain with a thousand amphorae =

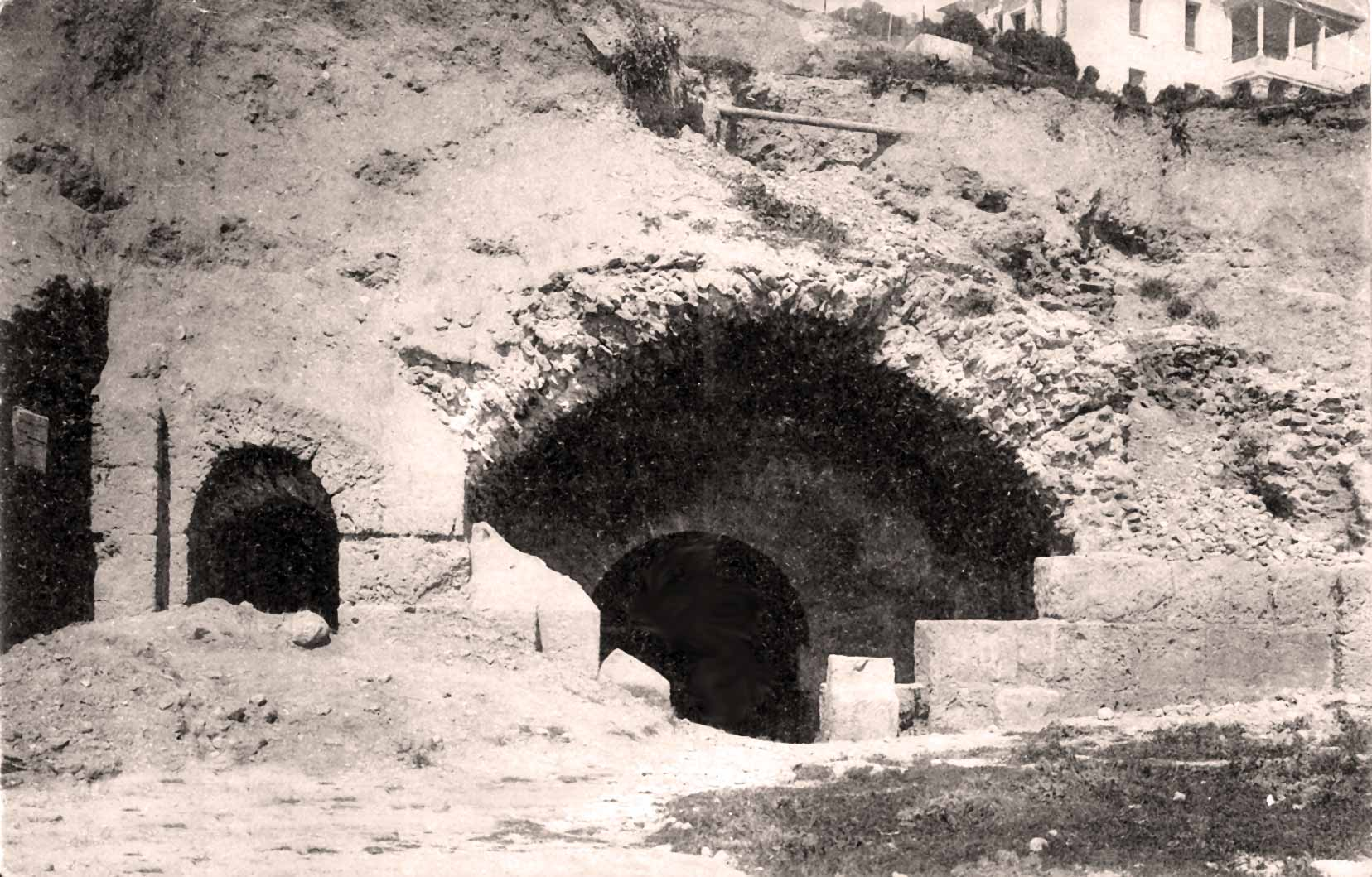
- Location: Carthage, Tunisia

The Fountain with a Thousand Amphorae (French: fontaine aux mille amphores) is an archaeological site located in the city of Carthage in Tunisia.

Discovered in 1919-1920 by Louis Carton, the site is inaccessible to visitors because it is inside the security zone of the Carthage Palace, the official residence of the president of Tunisia. On a spring developed since the time of Ancient Carthage, the structure was made during the Roman era.

== History ==
The Roman construction succeeds a Punic installation according to the discoverer of the site. Indeed, it is there that outcrops the only known spring in the site of Carthage. Prior to the discovery, Alfred Louis Delattre had discovered in the immediate vicinity a pile of 2,000 amphoras, hence the name.

== Description ==
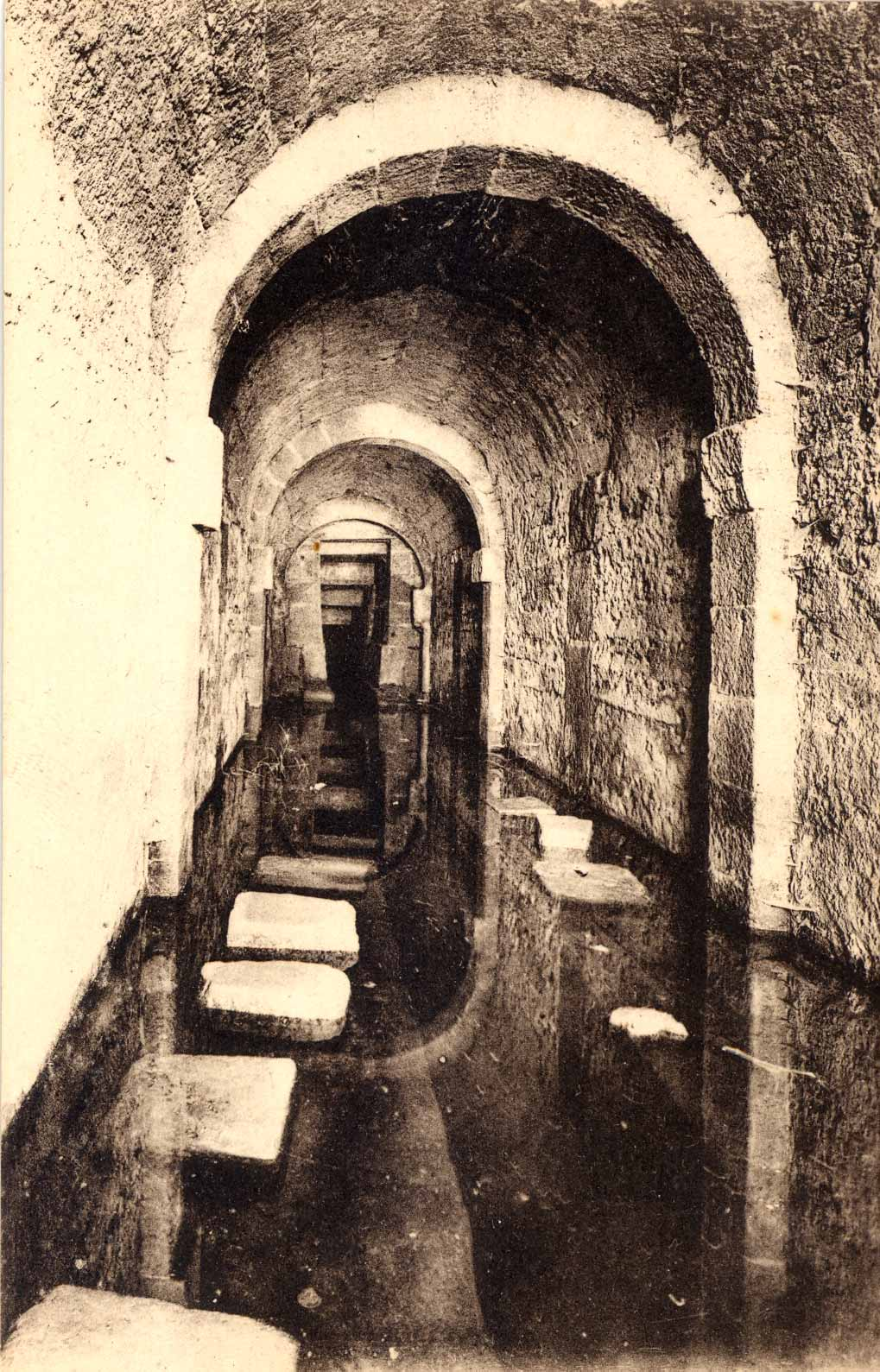
Gallery of the fountain

The fountain is not far from the Punic necropolis excavated at the end of the 19th and early 20th century: the Rabs necropolis excavated by Alfred Louis Delattre.

The site constitutes during its discovery one of the main vestiges of the hydraulic installations of the ancient city, with the large cisterns, including the main complex of the cisterns of La Malga.

Its elements

- catchment chamber (chambre de captation) partially dug into the rock;
- underground gallery;
- corridor (20 meters long).

== See also ==
- Carthage Punic Ports
- Necropolis of the Rabs
