= BASMA Association =

Organization of Tunisia

- Founded: March 7, 2000
- Founder: Leila Ben Ali
- Purpose: "BASMA Association for the Promotion of Employment for the Disabled Persons"
- Location: Tunisia
- Website: basma-emploi.tn

The BASMA Association for the Promotion of Employment of the Disabled is a charitable association. It was established on March 7, 2000, by Mrs. Leila Ben Ali, the wife of the former president of the Republic of Tunisia, Zine El Abidine Ben Ali. The BASMA (meaning "smile" in Arabic) Association seeks to back up the State's efforts in the integration of disabled people, particularly by contributing to enhancing their employment, offering them assistance in finding jobs in both the public and private sectors and also in starting their own projects. The association endeavors to disseminate the spirit of initiative and the sense self-reliance amongst disabled people and persons with specific needs, so as to repel the notion of dependency and to urge them to actively contribute to their own integration in the socio-economic circuit. BASMA contributes also to the training and employment of disabled people, and aids them market their products and participate in various trade fairs and events.

== Aims ==
BASMA's essential aim is to promote the employment of disabled persons either as wage-earners or as self-employed. In order to attain this goal, the association endeavors to prepare disabled individuals for professional life by providing or extending the training opportunities and by ensuring their educational integration at a very early pre-school age. Amongst the major aims of the association are:

1. The integration of disabled people into the economic circuit as wage-earners or self-employed
2. The exploration of new employment fields and areas
3. The rehabilitation and training of disabled people
4. The follow-up and supervision of disabled people
5. Awareness-raising

== Accomplishments ==
BASMA's action is not limited to the employment of disabled people. It also seeks to offer different types of services, including health and leisure, in order to help persons with specific needs to merge within the society and pull them out from the state and feeling of loneliness and marginalization. Thus, and as part of its endeavor to assist disabled people to integrate into socio-economic circuit, the association has proceeded on several occasions to the distribution of various kinds of equipment to help this category launch their own projects in different domains and areas, such as sewing, seaming and broidery, silk painting, silver manufacturing, and gardening.

The BASMA Club offers a multitude of services for the benefit of disabled people and persons with specific needs. Its essential objective is to help these categories lead a quasi- normal life and ultimately integrate the society. The club includes several facilities, namely workshops, art clubs, a swimming pool, a library, sports and play areas, health and therapy tracks, as well as coffee shops and food areas. The club also offers its members training in numerous areas such as ICT's, handicrafts, music, painting, and sports activities.

The BASMA Computer Center for the blind and the partially sighted which offers training sessions.

The Tele-servicing Unit (e-services) to leverage persons with disabilities knowledge of ICT's; this unit allows persons with disabilities to have remote access to various administrative and social services, next of course to Internet access.

The BASMA Call Center offers remote phone services for enterprises and the public. The center operates in collaboration with the Tunisian telecommunications company "Tunisie Télécom" and the national post-office "La Poste Tunisienne La Poste Tunisienne" for the processing of customers' phone calls. The center employs more than 40 operators, 80% of whom are persons with disabilities.

E-tasswik (e-marketing) is an electronic trade center for e-marketing handcrafted products made by disabled persons. This e-commerce portal aims at helping this category of people promote and sell their products via Internet.

== Partnerships ==
The BASMA Association has always endeavored to set up and uphold effective partnership relationships with several governmental and non-governmental structures operating in the field of the rehabilitation and employment of disabled people. It is within this frame that BASMA set up a network of relations with national and international bodies so as to bestow further efficiency upon its operations. This has culminated in the signature of partnership and cooperation agreements with the following bodies:

- The Tunisian Solidarity Bank (BTS)
- The National Agency for Employment and Independent Work (ANETI)
- The Tunisian Professional Training Agency (ATFP)
- The Tunisian Solidarity Union (UTS)
- The Institute for the Promotion of the Disabled (IPH)
