= Naïma Ben Ali =

Tunisian First Lady (1944/1945–2025)

- نعيمة بن علي

First Lady of Tunisia
- In office November 7, 1987 – 1988
- President: Zine El Abidine Ben Ali
- Preceded by: Wassila Bourguiba
- Succeeded by: Leïla Ben Ali (1992)

Personal details
- Born: Naïma Kefi; 1944 or 1945
- Died: 9 April 2025 (aged 80)
- Spouse: Zine El Abidine Ben Ali (m. 1964; div. 1988)
- Children: 3

Naïma Ben Ali (Arabic: نعيمة بن علي, romanized: Naʿīme bin ʿAlī; 1944 or 1945 – 9 April 2025); née Kefi (الكافي, il-Kēfī) was the First Lady of Tunisia as the first wife of Zine El Abidine Ben Ali, serving from 1987 until her divorce from Ben Ali in 1988.

== Biography ==
Born Naïma Kefi, she was the daughter of Mohamad Kefi, a prominent Tunisian army general who held a high official position in the post-independence government. She met a young member of the Tunisian Army, Zine El Abidine Ben Ali, during the late 1950s or 1960s, though the circumstances of their meeting remain subject to some debate. The couple married in 1964. Ben Ali's marriage to Naïma, the daughter of a high ranking general, immediately helped his career and eventually helped propel him to the presidency two decades later. Ben Ali, who was only a non-commissioned officer at the time, was appointed Director of Military Intelligence in 1964, shortly after his wedding.

Naïma Ben Ali and Ben Ali had three daughters, all of whom married prominent Tunisian businessmen: Ghazoua Ben Ali, born March 8, 1963, in Le Bardo prior to their marriage, and married Slim Zarouk. Dorsaf Ben Ali, born July 5, 1965, is married to Slim Chiboub. Their youngest daughter, Cyrine Ben Ali, was born August 21, 1971.

By the mid-1980s, Ben Ali, the then Director General of National Security, was having an affair with his mistress, Leïla Trabelsi, whom he had met in 1984, marking the beginning of the end of his marriage to Naïma Ben Ali. Ben Ali and Trabelsi had a daughter out of wedlock in January 1987.

Naïma Ben Ali became First Lady of Tunisia in 1987 when Zine El Abidine Ben Ali became president. However, President Ben Ali divorced Naïma in 1988, after 24 years of marriage, in favor of his mistress, Leïla Trabelsi, who moved into the presidential palace shortly after the separation was announced.

Naïma Ben Ali remained in Tunis following the Tunisian Revolution, which ousted her ex-husband from power. She died on 9 April 2025, at the age of 80.
