= Zine El Abidine Ben Ali =

President of Tunisia from 1987 to 2011

- زين العابدين بن علي
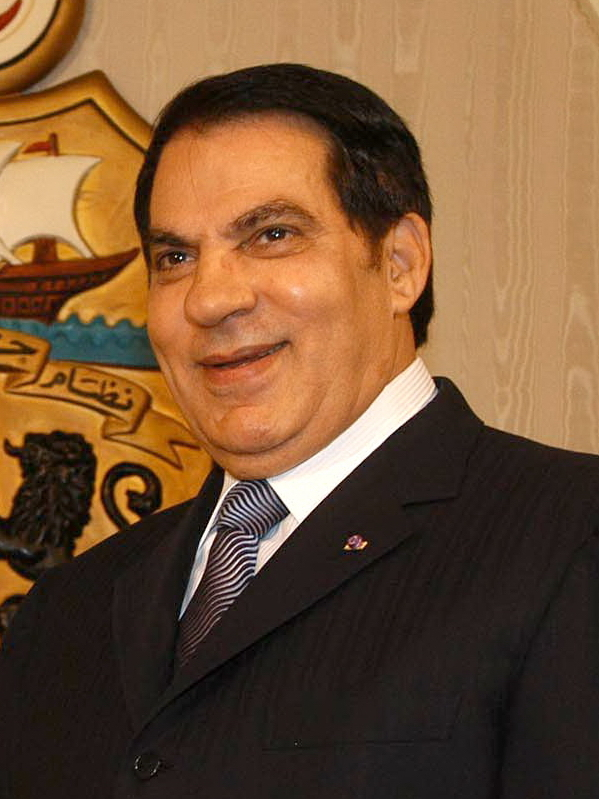
- Ben Ali in 2008

2nd President of Tunisia
- In office 7 November 1987 – 14 January 2011
- Prime Minister: Hédi Baccouche; Hamed Karoui; Mohamed Ghannouchi
- Preceded by: Habib Bourguiba
- Succeeded by: Mohamed Ghannouchi (interim)

Prime Minister of Tunisia
- In office 2 October 1987 – 7 November 1987
- President: Habib Bourguiba
- Preceded by: Rachid Sfar
- Succeeded by: Hédi Baccouche

Minister of the Interior
- In office 28 April 1986 – 7 November 1987
- President: Habib Bourguiba
- Preceded by: Mohammed Mzali
- Succeeded by: Habib Ammar

Director General of National Security
- In office January 1984 – 28 April 1986
- President: Habib Bourguiba

Ambassador of Tunisia to Poland
- In office April 1980 – January 1984
- President: Habib Bourguiba

Director General of National Security
- In office December 1977 – April 1980
- President: Habib Bourguiba

Director of Military Intelligence
- In office 1964–1974
- President: Habib Bourguiba

Personal details
- Born: 3 September 1936 Hammam Sousse, then part of Beylik of Tunis within French Tunisia
- Died: 19 September 2019 (aged 83) Jeddah, Saudi Arabia
- Resting place: Al-Baqi Cemetery, Medina, Saudi Arabia
- Party: Socialist Destourian Party (1986–1988); Constitutional Democratic Rally (1988–2011)
- Spouses: Naïma Kefi (m. 1964; div. 1988); Leïla Trabelsi (m. 1992)
- Children: Ghazwa; Dorsaf; Cyrine; Nesrine; Halima; Mohamed Zine El Abidine
- Education: Special Military School of Saint Cyr; School of Applied Artillery; Senior Intelligence School in Maryland; School for Anti-Aircraft Field Artillery in Texas
- Full name: Zine El Abidine Ben Haj Hamda Ben Haj Hassen Ben Ali
- Military career
- Allegiance: Tunisia
- Branch: Tunisian Army
- Service years: 1958–1980
- Rank: Brigadier general

Zine El Abidine Ben Ali (Arabic: زَيْن الْعَابِدِين بْن عَلِيّ, romanized: Zayn al-ʿĀbidīn bin ʿAliyy, Tunisian Arabic: Zīn il-ʿĀbdīn bin ʿAlī; 3 September 1936 – 19 September 2019), commonly known as Ben Ali or Ezzine, was a Tunisian politician, military officer and dictator who served as the second president of Tunisia from 1987 to 2011. In that year, during the Tunisian revolution, he was overthrown and fled to Saudi Arabia.

Ben Ali was appointed Prime Minister in October 1987. He assumed the Presidency on 7 November 1987 in a bloodless coup d'état that ousted President Habib Bourguiba by declaring him incompetent. Ben Ali led an authoritarian regime. He was re-elected in several non-democratic elections where he won with enormous majorities, each time exceeding 90% of the vote, his final re-election coming on 25 October 2009. Ben Ali was the penultimate surviving leader deposed in the Arab Spring; he was survived by Egypt's Hosni Mubarak, the latter dying in February 2020.

On 14 January 2011, following a month of protests against his rule, he fled to Saudi Arabia along with his wife Leïla Ben Ali and their three children. The interim Tunisian government asked Interpol to issue an international arrest warrant, charging him with money laundering and drug trafficking. A Tunisian court sentenced Ben Ali and his wife in absentia to 35 years in prison on 20 June 2011 on charges of theft and unlawful possession of cash and jewelry, which was put up for auction. In June 2012, a Tunisian court sentenced him in absentia to life imprisonment for inciting violence and murder and another life sentence by a military court in April 2013 for violent repression of protests in Sfax. He served none of those sentences, subsequently dying in Jeddah, Saudi Arabia, on 19 September 2019 at the age of 83 after nearly a decade in exile.

== Early life, education and military career ==
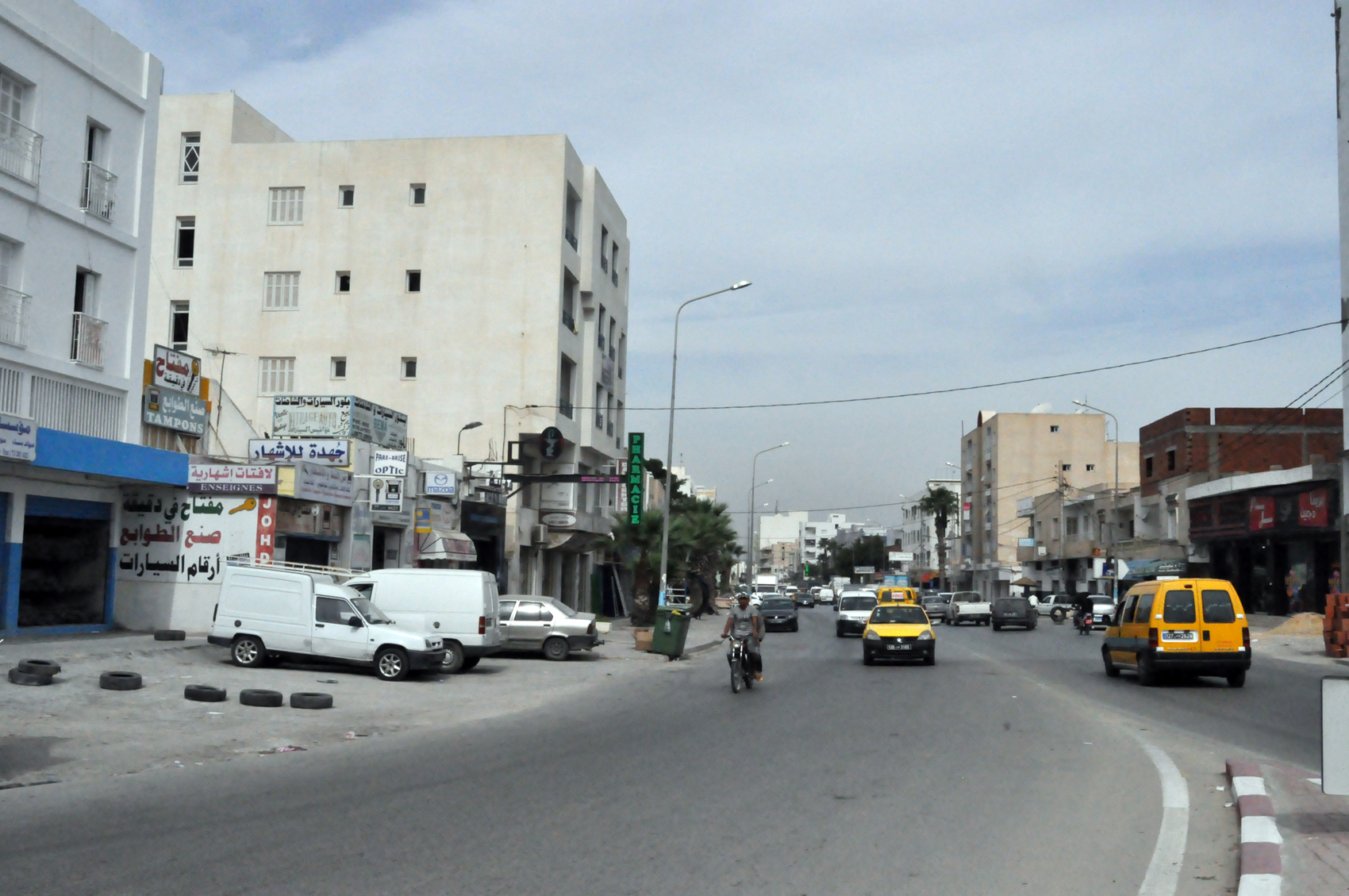
Hammam Sousse, birthplace of Ben Ali

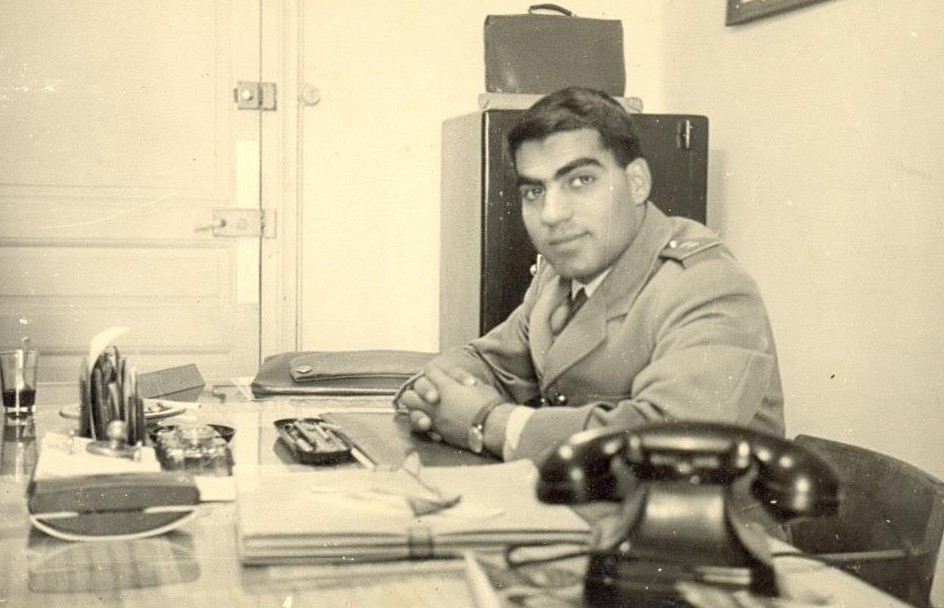
A young Ben Ali, as a military officer, in Tunis, 1961

Ben Ali was born in 1936 to moderate-income parents as the fourth of eleven children in the family. His father, originally from Arram, Gabes worked as a guard at the port city of Sousse.

Ben Ali joined the local resistance against French colonial forces and was imprisoned. His expulsion from secondary school was the reason why he never completed his secondary education. He studied at the Sousse Technical Institute but failed to earn a professional certificate and joined the newly formed Tunisian Army in 1958. Nevertheless, after being chosen as one among a group of young officers, he was awarded training in France at the École Spéciale Militaire de Saint-Cyr in Coëtquidan and the School of Applied Artillery in Châlons-sur-Marne, and also in the United States at the Senior Intelligence School in Maryland and the School for Anti-Aircraft Field Artillery in Texas. He also held a diploma in electronics engineering from a local university. Returning to Tunisia in 1964, he began his professional military career the same year as a Tunisian staff officer. During his time in military service, he established the Military Security Department and directed its operations for 10 years. He briefly served as military attaché in the Tunisian embassy of Morocco and Spain before being appointed General Director of National Security in 1977.

In April 1980, Ben Ali was appointed ambassador to Poland, and served in that position for four years. He also served as the military intelligence chief from 1964 to 1974 and later Director General of national security between December 1977 and 1980 until he was appointed as Minister of Defense. Soon after the Tunisian bread riots in January 1984, he was reappointed director-general of national security.

Ben Ali subsequently served as Minister of State in charge of the interior before being appointed Interior Minister on 28 April 1986 then Prime Minister by President Habib Bourguiba in October 1987.

== Rise to presidency ==
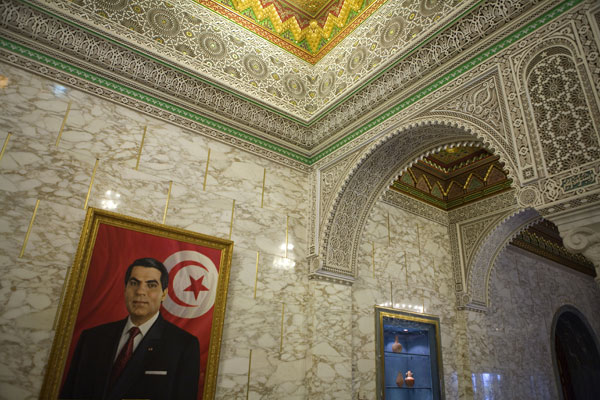
Portrait of Ben Ali at the presidential palace of Carthage

On the morning of 7 November 1987, doctors attending to President Bourguiba filed an official medical report declaring him medically incapacitated and unable to fulfill the duties of the presidency. Ben Ali, next in line to the presidency, removed Bourguiba from office and assumed the presidency himself. The day of his accession to power was celebrated annually in Tunisia as New Era Day. Two of the names given to Ben Ali's rise to the presidency include "the medical coup d'état" and the "Tunisian revolution". Ben Ali favoured the latter. Ben Ali’s assumption of the presidency was in conformity with Article 57 of the Tunisian Constitution. The country had faced 10% inflation, external debt accounting for 46% of GDP and a debt service ratio of 21% of GDP.

In 1999, Fulvio Martini, former head of Italian military secret service SISMI, declared to a parliamentary committee that "from 1985 to 1987, we organized a coup of sorts in Tunisia, putting President Ben Ali as head of state, replacing Bourguiba who wanted to flee". Bourguiba, although a symbol of anti-colonial resistance, was considered incapable of leading his country any longer, and his reaction to the rising Islamic integrism was deemed "a bit too energetic" by Martini; Bourguiba's threat to execute the suspects might have generated strong negative responses in neighbouring countries. Acting under directives from Italian Prime Minister Bettino Craxi and Foreign Minister Giulio Andreotti, Martini claims to have brokered the accord that led to the peaceful transition of powers.

According to Martini, the SISMI did not have an operational role in Ben Ali's rise to power, but organised a move to support his new government politically and economically, preventing Tunisia from falling into an open confrontation with fundamentalists, as happened in Algeria in the following years.

== Presidency (1987–2011) ==
=== Politics ===
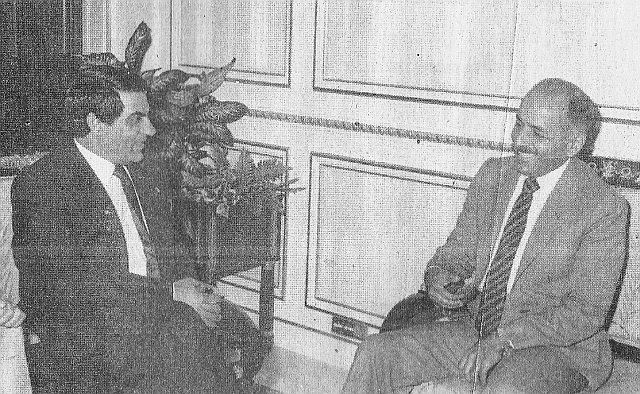
Ben Ali with Iraqi Deputy Prime Minister Taha Yassin Ramadan in 1988

Alan Cowell, a prominent New York Times journalist, believed Ben Ali's initial promises of a more democratic way of ruling the country than had prevailed under Bourguiba. One of his first acts upon taking office was to loosen restrictions on the press; for the first time state-controlled newspapers published statements from the opposition. Ben Ali also released some political prisoners and granted them with pardons. In 1988, he changed the name of the ruling Destourian Socialist Party to the Democratic Constitutional Rally (RCD), and pushed through constitutional amendments that limited the president to three five-year terms, with no more than two in a row.

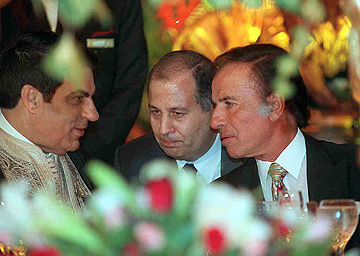
Ben Ali with Carlos Menem in 1997

However, the conduct of the 1989 elections was little different from past elections. The RCD swept every seat in the legislature, and Ben Ali appeared alone on the ballot in Tunisia's first presidential election since 1974. Although opposition parties had been legal since 1981, presidential candidates were required to get endorsements from 30 political figures. Given the RCD's near-absolute dominance of the political scene, prospective opposition candidates discovered they could not get their nomination papers signed. The subsequent years saw the return of several Bourguiba-era restrictions. For many years, the press had been expected to practice self-censorship, but this increasingly gave way to official censorship. Amendments to the press code allowed the Interior Ministry to review all newspaper and magazine articles before publication. In 1992, the president's younger brother Habib Ben Ali was tried in absentia in France for laundering the proceeds of drug trafficking, in a case known as the "couscous connection". French television news was blocked in Tunisia during the trial.

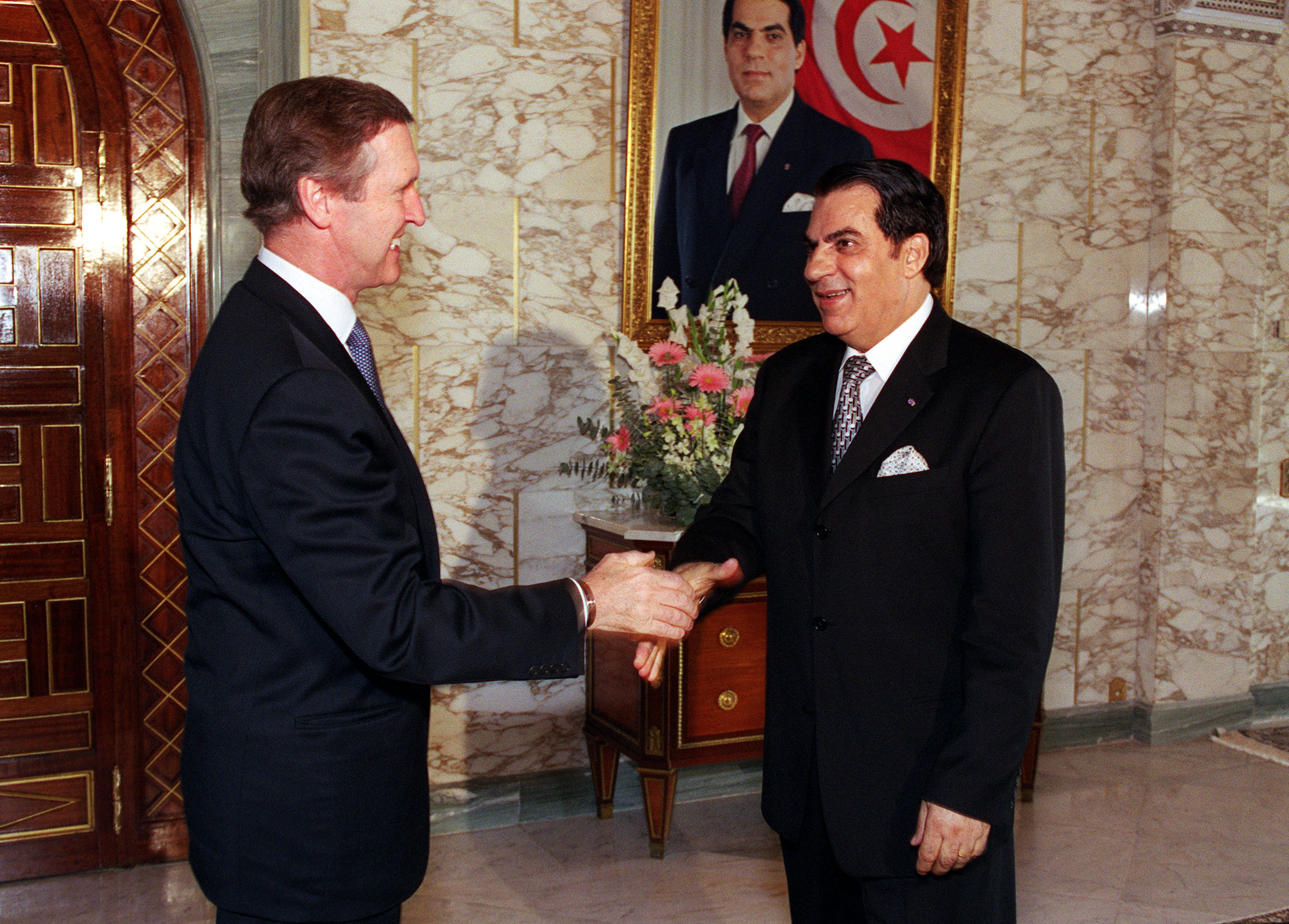
William Cohen is welcomed by Ben Ali at the Presidential Palace in Tunis, 2000.

At the 1994 elections, opposition parties polled 2.25% and gained 19 of 163 seats in Parliament; the first-time opposition parties had actually managed to get into the chamber. Ben Ali was unopposed for a second full term, again after being the only candidate to get enough endorsements to qualify. Turnout was officially reported at 95%. However, at this and subsequent elections, opposition parties never accounted for more than 24 per cent of the seats in the Chamber of Deputies. All legislation continued to originate with the president, and there was little meaningful opposition to executive decisions.

In 1999, Ben Ali became the first Tunisian president to actually face an opponent after the 30-signature requirement was lifted a few months earlier. However, he won a third full term with an implausible 99.4 percent of the vote.

A constitutional referendum in 2002—the first ever held in Tunisia—established a two-chambered parliament, creating the Chamber of Advisers. It also allowed the president to run for an unlimited number of five-year terms and amended the upper age limit for a presidential candidate to 75 years old (previously 70). The latter measures were clearly aimed at keeping Ben Ali in office; he faced having to give up the presidency in 2004. He was duly reelected in 2004, again by an implausibly high margin—this time 94 percent of the vote.

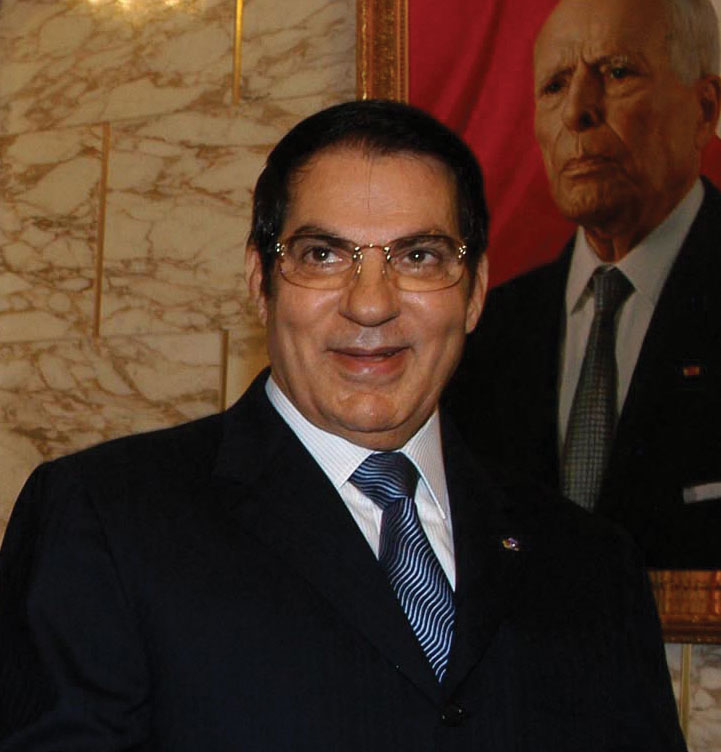
Ben Ali in 2002

Tunisia under Ben Ali was known for its human rights violations such as lack of freedom of the press, highlighted by the official treatment of the journalist Taoufik Ben Brik, who was harassed and imprisoned for his criticism of Ben Ali. By the dawn of the new millennium, Ben Ali was reckoned as leading one of the most repressive regimes in the world. Under his rule, Tunisia consistently ranked near the bottom of most international rankings for human rights and press freedom.

On 25 October 2009, Ben Ali was re-elected for a fifth term with 89% of the vote. The African Union sent a team of observers to cover the election. The delegation was led by Benjamin Bounkoulou, who described the election as "free and fair". However, a spokesperson from the US State Department indicated that Tunisia had not permitted monitoring of the election by international observers, but that the U.S. was still committed to working with the Ben Ali and the Tunisian government. There also were reports of mistreatment of an opposition candidate.

In December 2010 and January 2011, riots over unemployment escalated into a widespread popular protest movement against Ben Ali's government. On 13 January 2011, he announced he would not run for another term in 2014, and pledged steps to improve the economy and loosen restrictions on the press. The following day, however, thousands demonstrated in the center of Tunis, demanding Ben Ali's immediate resignation. On 14 January 2011, Ben Ali, his wife and children fled to Saudi Arabia, and a caretaker ruling committee headed by Prime Minister Mohamed Ghannouchi was announced.

=== Economy ===
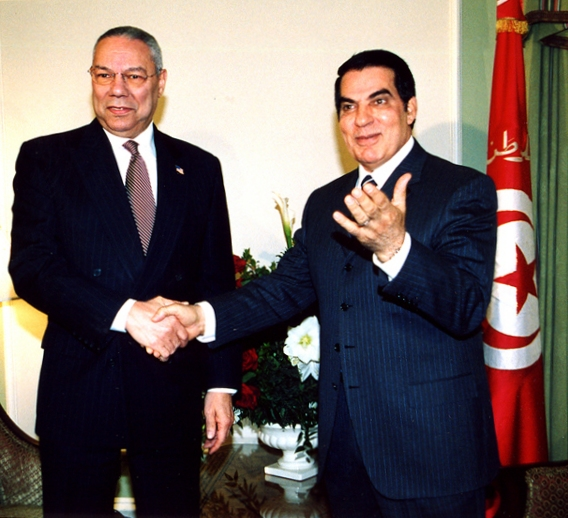
Colin Powell meeting with Ben Ali on 17 February 2004

As president, Ben Ali instituted economic reforms that increased Tunisia's growth rate and foreign investment. During his administration, Tunisia's per capita GDP more than tripled from $1,201 in 1986 to $3,786 in 2008. Although growth in 2002 slowed to a 15-year low of 1.9% due to drought and lackluster tourism (partly due to some tourists being nervous about flying in the aftermath of the 9/11 attacks in New York), better conditions after 2003 helped push growth to about 5% of GDP. For about 20 years after 1987, the GDP annual growth averaged nearly 5%. A report published in July 2010 by the Boston Consulting Group (The African Challengers: Global Competitors Emerge from the Overlooked Continent) listed Tunisia as one of the African "Lions" and indicated the eight such countries account for 70% of the continent's gross domestic product.

Steady increases in GDP growth continued through positive trade relations with the European Union, a revitalised tourism industry and sustained agricultural production. Privatization, increasing foreign investment, improvements in government efficiency and reduction of the trade deficit presented challenges for the future. The 2010/11 Global Competitiveness Report (Davos World Economic Forum) ranked Tunisia 1st in Africa and 32nd globally out of 139 countries but it dropped to 40th in 2011/12 as a result of political instability and was not ranked in 2012/13.

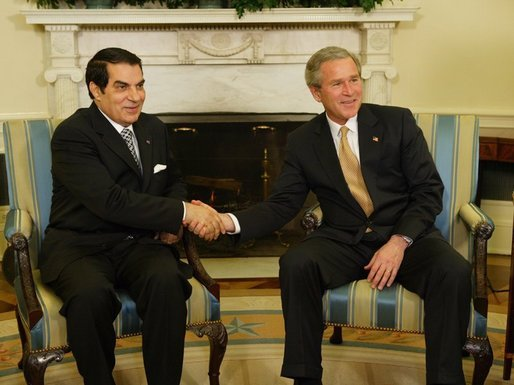
Ben Ali with George W. Bush in the Oval Office, 18 February 2004

According to the Oxford Business Group, Tunisia's economy was likely to grow from 2008 thanks to its diversified industries.

Committed to fighting poverty at home, Ben Ali instituted reforms, including the National Solidarity Fund, which slashed the Tunisian poverty rate from 7.4% in 1990 to an estimated 3.8% in 2005. The National Solidarity Fund was part of a dual strategy to fight current and potential terrorism through economic assistance, development and the rule of law, but also increased opportunities for corruption and clientelism. The fund provided opportunities to those living in impoverished areas and are vulnerable to recruitment by terrorists. It was a critical element in the fight against terrorism.

=== Diplomacy ===
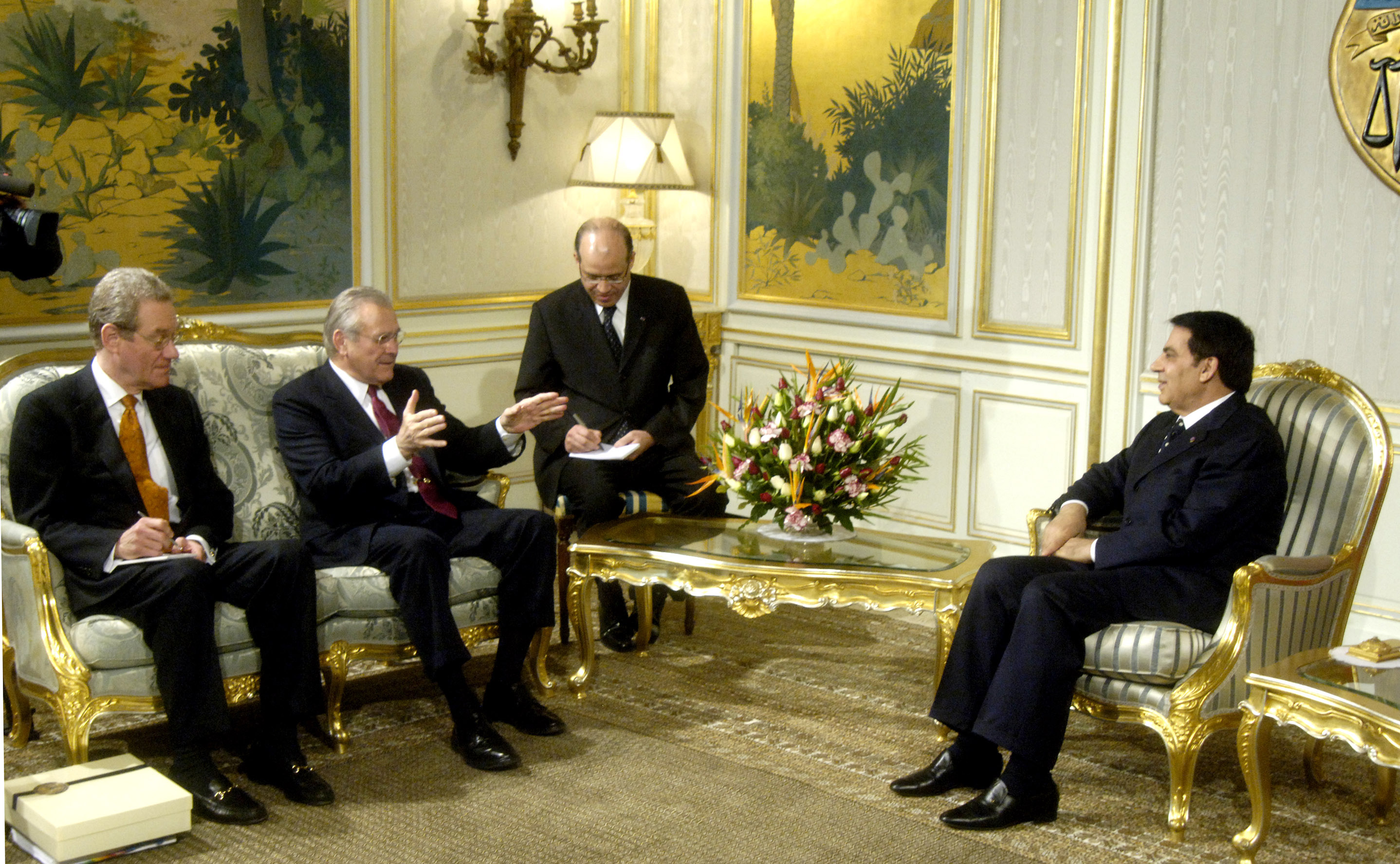
Donald H. Rumsfeld and Peter Rodman meet with Ben Ali in Tunis, February 2006

During Ben Ali's presidency, Tunisia pursued a moderate foreign policy promoting peaceful settlement of conflicts. Tunisia took a middle of the road approach contributing to peacemaking, especially in the Middle East and Africa. Tunisia hosted the first-ever Palestinian American dialogue. While contributing actively to the Middle East peace process, Tunisian diplomacy has supported the Palestinian cause. As host to the Palestine Liberation Organization in 1982–1993, Ben Ali's government tried to moderate the views of that organisation. Tunisia, since the early 1990s, called for a "concerted" international effort against terrorism. It was also a key US partner in the effort to fight global terrorism through the Trans-Saharan Counterterrorism Initiative. Ben Ali mostly retained his predecessor's pro-western foreign policy, though he improved ties with the Arab and Muslim world. He took several initiatives to promote solidarity, dialogue and cooperation among nations. Ben Ali initiated the creation of the United Nations World Solidarity Fund to eradicate poverty and promote social development based on the successful experience of the Tunisian National Solidarity Fund. Ben Ali also played a lead role in the UN's proclaiming 2010 as the International Year of Youth.

=== International characterisations ===
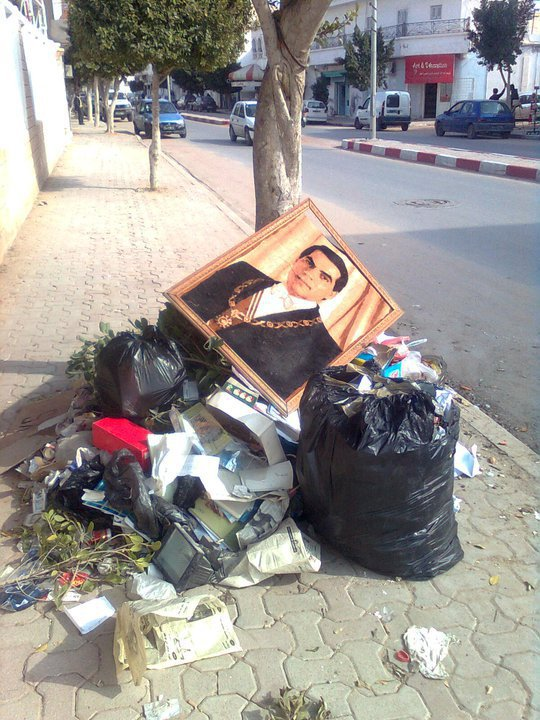
Ben Ali's portrait thrown into trash

Ben Ali's government was considered to have one of the worst human rights records in the world. It largely bucked the trend toward greater democracy in Africa. The level of repression became particularly severe during what would be the last decade of his rule. Ben Ali's government was deemed dictatorial, authoritarian and undemocratic by international human rights groups such as Amnesty International, Freedom House, and Protection International. They criticised Tunisian officials for not observing international standards of political rights and interfering with the work of local human rights organisations. In The Economist's 2010 Democracy Index, Tunisia was classified as an authoritarian regime, ranking 144th out of 167 countries studied. In 2008, in terms of freedom of the press, Tunisia was ranked 143 out of 173.

== Revolution and overthrow ==
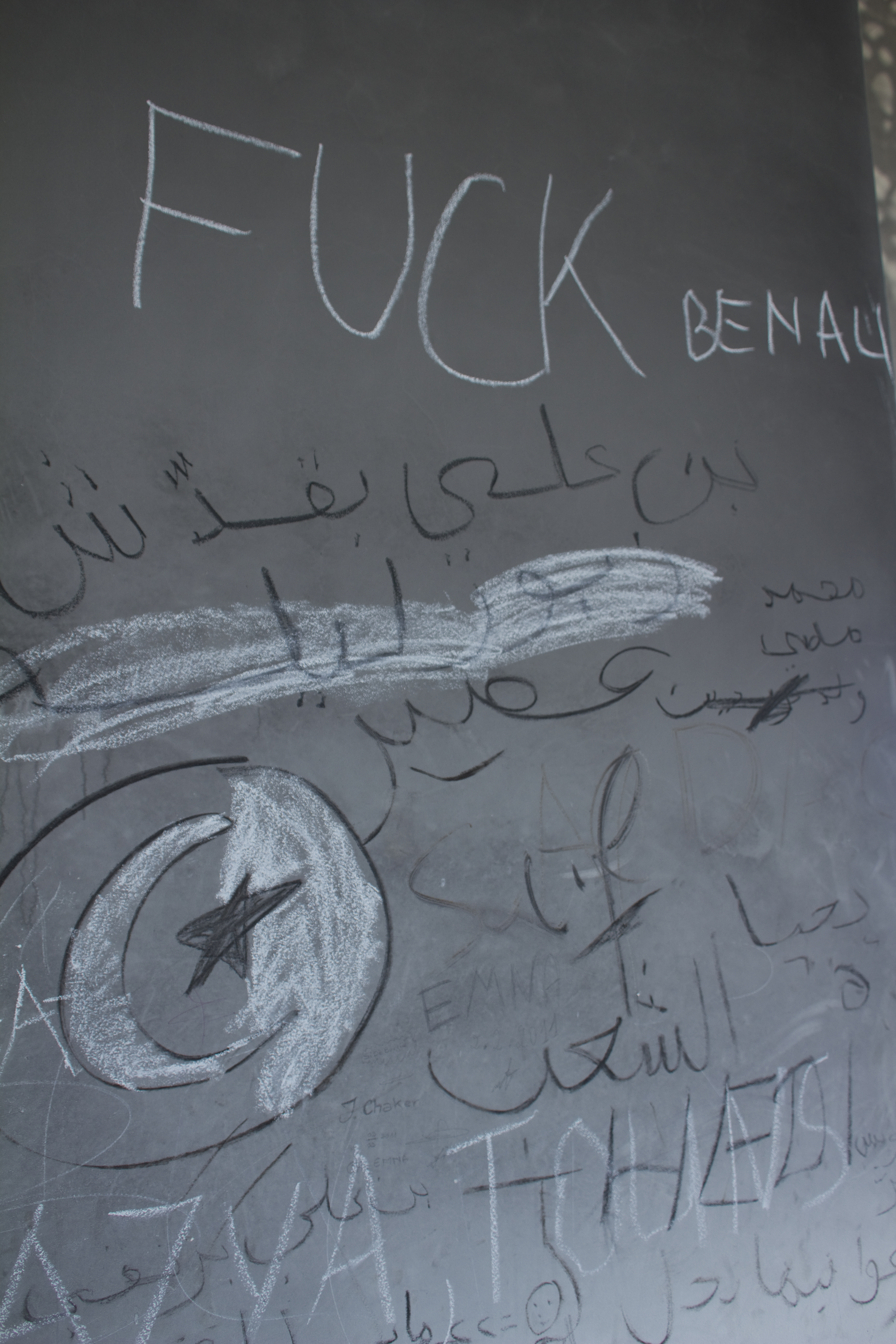
Graffiti against Ben Ali

In response to the protests, Ben Ali declared a state of emergency, dissolved the government on 14 January 2011, and promised new legislative elections within six months. However, events moved quickly, and it appears the armed forces and key members of the legislature had lost confidence in Ben Ali and had decided to take steps of their own. With power slipping from Ben Ali's grasp, prime minister Mohamed Ghannouchi announced that he would act as head of state during the president's "temporary" absence. With the army surrounding the Presidential Palace in Tunis, Ben Ali and close members of his family hastily left and headed to Laouina airport (annexed to the Tunis–Carthage International Airport). The military allowed Ben Ali's plane to take off, immediately after which the Tunisian airspace was closed. The presidential plane then left for Jeddah, Saudi Arabia. Subsequent reports in the media rumoured that Ben Ali was seeking protection in either France or Malta, although a Tunisian pilot who was involved in the arrangement of the flight stated that the plan was "to fly directly to Jeddah", which is also supported by recordings released by the BBC in 2022. Ben Ali and his family were accepted by King Abdullah to live in Saudi Arabia under the condition that he should keep out of politics. Ben Ali and his family went to exile in Jeddah.

Other close associates and family members who attempted to leave the country via Tunis-Carthage were prevented from doing so by the army, which had seized the airport.

=== Succession confusion ===
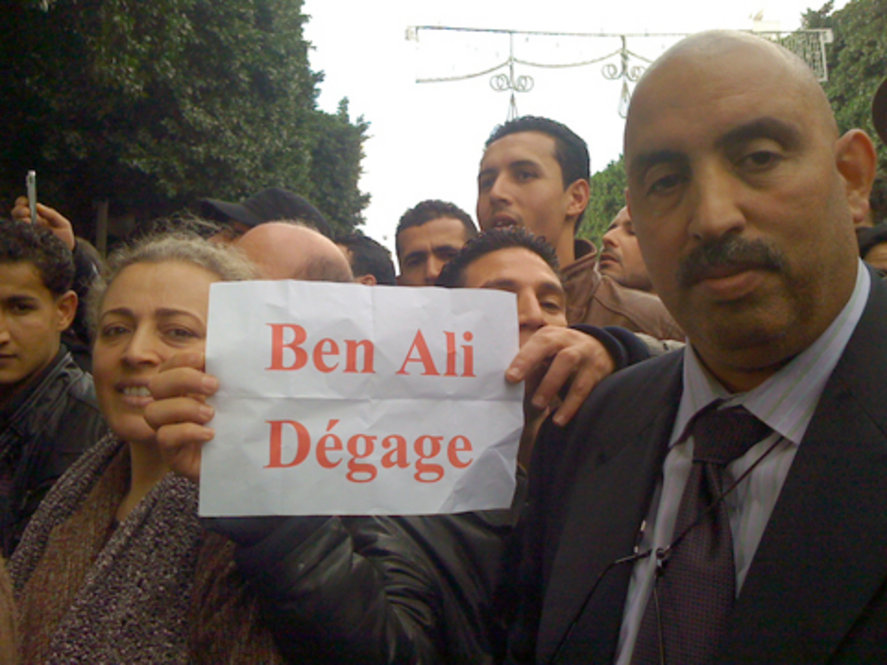
A banner demanding the resignation of Ben Ali in French

At about 18:00, Prime Minister Mohamed Ghannouchi went on state television to say "Since the president is temporarily unable to exercise his duties, it has been decided that the prime minister will temporarily exercise the (presidential) duties."

However, this arrangement was very short-lived, because early the following day (15 January 2011), the Constitutional Council of Tunisia determined that Ben Ali was not "temporarily unable" to exercise his duties and that the presidency was in fact vacant. The arrangements he had made with the Prime Minister before leaving the country were found to be unconstitutional under article 57 of the constitution. The country's constitutional council, at the time the highest legal authority on constitutional matters, announced the transition saying that Fouad Mebazaa, the Speaker of Parliament, had been appointed acting president.

Mebazaa took the oath in his office in parliament, swearing to respect the constitution in the presence of his senate counterpart, Abdallal Kallel, and representatives of both houses. It was also announced that the speaker of parliament would occupy the post of president temporarily and that elections would be held within a period of between 45 and 60 days.

=== Flight and trial in absentia ===
On 26 January 2011, the Tunisian government issued an international arrest warrant for Ben Ali, accusing him of taking money out of the nation illegally and illegally acquiring real estate and other assets abroad, Justice Minister Lazhar Karoui Chebbi said. Videos show that the president stashed cash and jewellery in the president's palace. The gold and jewellery will be redistributed to the people by the government. The Swiss government announced that it was freezing millions of dollars held in bank accounts by his family. On 28 January 2011, Interpol issued an arrest warrant for Ben Ali and his six family members, including his wife Leïla.

After Ben Ali fled Tunisia following the Tunisian revolution, he and his wife were tried in absentia for his suspected involvement in some of the country's largest businesses during his 23-year-long reign. On 20 June 2011, Ben Ali and his wife were sentenced to 35 years in prison after being found guilty of theft and unlawful possession of cash and jewellery. The verdict also included a penalty of 91 million Tunisian dinars (approximately €50 million, and $64 million) that Ben Ali was required to pay. This verdict was dismissed as a "charade" by some Tunisians dissatisfied with the trial and as a "joke" by Ben Ali's lawyer. The sentences were to take immediate effect, although Ben Ali and his wife were living in Saudi Arabia and the Saudi government ignored Tunisia's requests to extradite them.

== Family ==
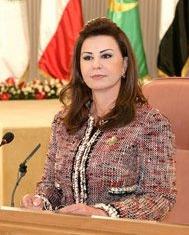
Leïla Ben Ali

Ben Ali and his family were accused of corruption, which was a major contribution to the Tunisian Revolution which led to the fall of his government. Many of Ben Ali's family members subsequently also fled the country. On 20 January 2011, Tunisian television reported that 33 members of Ben Ali's family had been arrested in the past week, as they tried to flee the country.

Leïla Ben Ali was the chair of the BASMA Association, a group that promotes social integration and provides employment opportunities for the disabled. She was also the president of the Arab Women Organization, which works to empower women in Arab states. She has three children.

Tunisian authorities requested the extradition of Ben Ali's daughter Halima from France in 2026, accusing her of financial crimes during her father's rule.

== Health condition and death ==
On 17 February 2011, it was reported that Ben Ali had suffered a stroke, and had been hospitalised for an indefinite period. Al Jazeera reported that a Saudi source had confirmed that Ben Ali had indeed sustained severe complications of a stroke and that he was in critical condition. The information has never been confirmed or denied by the Saudi government. However, on 17 June 2011, Ben Ali's attorney, Jean-Yves Leborgne, stated that Ben Ali "is not in the state that he's said to be in" and that "a meeting with his client took place under 'normal circumstances'".

Ben Ali died at a hospital in Jeddah, Saudi Arabia, of prostate cancer, on 19 September 2019 at the age of 83. He was buried on 21 September at the Al-Baqi Cemetery in Medina.

== Decorations ==
=== Tunisian national honours ===
- Grand Master of the Order of Independence
- Grand Master of the Order of the Republic
- Grand Master of the National Order of Merit
- Grand Master of the Order of the Seventh of November

=== Foreign honours ===
- Argentina: Grand Cross of Order of the Liberator General San Martín (1997)
- Austria: Grand Star of the Decoration of Honour for Services to the Republic of Austria (2003)
- Egypt: Collar of the Order of the Nile (1990)
- France: Grand Cross of the Order of the Legion of Honour (1989)
- Japan: Grand Cordon of the Order of the Chrysanthemum (1996)
- Libya: Collar of the Order of the Grand Conqueror (1992)
- Malta: Honorary Companions of Honour with Collar of the National Order of Merit (Malta) (2005)
- Monaco: Grand Cross of the Order of Saint-Charles (7 September 2006)
- Morocco: Grand Cross of the Order of Ouissam Alaouite (1987)
- Palestine: Grand Collar of the State of Palestine (1996)
- Portugal: Grand Collar of the Order of Prince Henry (1995)
- Romania: Collar of the Order of the Star of Romania (2003)
- South Africa: Grand Cross of the Order of Good Hope (5 April 1995)
- Spain: Collar of the Order of Isabella the Catholic (25 May 1991)

== See also ==
- 18 October Coalition for Rights and Freedoms

Political offices
Preceded by Mohammed Mzali	Minister of the Interior; 1986–1987	Succeeded by Habib Ammar
Preceded by Rachid Sfar	Prime Minister of Tunisia; 1987	Succeeded by Hédi Baccouche
Preceded by Habib Bourguiba	President of Tunisia; 1987–2011	Succeeded by Mohamed Ghannouchi as Acting
Diplomatic posts
Preceded by Hosni Mubarak	Chairman of the Organisation of African Unity; 1994–1995	Succeeded by Meles Zenawi
