= Leïla Ben Ali =

Former First Lady of Tunisia

- ليلى بن علي
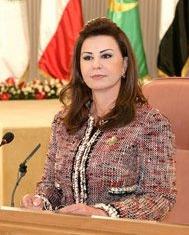
- Ben Ali in 2010

First Lady of Tunisia
- In office 26 January 1992 – 14 January 2011
- President: Zine El Abidine Ben Ali
- Preceded by: Naïma Ben Ali
- Succeeded by: Lilia Mebazaa

Personal details
- Born: Leïla Trabelsi; 14 or 24 October 1956 Tunis, Kingdom of Tunisia
- Spouse(s): Khelil Maaouia (divorced) Zine El Abidine Ben Ali (m. 1992; died 2019)
- Children: 3

Leïla Ben Ali (Tunisian Arabic: ليلى بن علي Līlē bin ʿAlī; née Trabelsi [الطرابلسي, iṭ-Ṭrēbelsī]; born 14 or 24 October 1956) is the widow of former Tunisian president Zine El Abidine Ben Ali and served as First Lady of Tunisia from their marriage in 1992 to Ben Ali's overthrow during the Tunisian revolution in 2011.

Leïla Ben Ali was the president of the Arab Women Organization and chair of the BASMA Association, a charitable organization working to secure employment for disabled people. In July 2010, Ben Ali founded SAIDA to improve care for cancer patients in Tunisia. Following the Tunisian revolution, she fled with her husband and three children into exile in Saudi Arabia. During her time as First Lady of Tunisia, she is believed to have enriched herself and her family through gross corruption and embezzlement of state money to finance a lavish lifestyle, factors that contributed to the protests against the regime of Ben Ali at the end of 2010. As of 2011 she is wanted by Interpol on behest of the Tunisian judiciary for high treason and money laundering.

== Early life and family ==
Leïla Trabelsi is the daughter of Mohamed and Saïda Trabelsi. She has ten brothers and sisters. A "hard hitting" 2009 book by French journalists Nicholas Beau and Catherine Graciet traced her rise from the daughter of a dried fruit seller to First Lady. Prior to her 1992 marriage to Ben Ali, she was a hairdresser with little formal education, partying hard in Paris. She was married for three years to Khelil Maaouia. She then had an affair with industrial magnate, Farid Mokhtar, a friend of the Prime Minister who introduced her to the highest levels of Tunisian society.

After her romantic relationship and subsequent marriage to Tunisian President Zine El Abidine Ben Ali, she and her family rose to prominent positions in Tunisian business and became noted for their greed, power and ruthlessness. Leïla Ben Ali and most of her relatives fled Tunisia to Saudi Arabia, France, Canada and Qatar on 14 January 2011, when President Ben Ali was ousted.

== Philanthropy ==
Leïla Ben Ali was active in philanthropy and humanitarian work in her role as First Lady of Tunisia. She founded the BASMA Association in 2000 to help secure employment for disabled people, and has chaired the organization ever since. Under her leadership the association has provided micro-finance loans, secured employment for many and opened a center for disabled people in October 2010. The center provided technical training in a number of fields including computer science, embroidery, carpentry, theater and music.

She also started SAIDA, an initiative to improve cancer treatment, in 2010. She frequently gave speeches, was present at official ceremonies and occasionally read her husband's speeches. She regularly travelled with the president on official visits to other countries. Ben Ali was also active in S.O.S. Gammarth and El Karama, which provided care for orphans and promoted human rights, respectively.

=== Arab Women Organization ===
As president of the AWO, Leïla Ben Ali established the Arab Women's commission for International Humanitarian Law that served to promote international humanitarian law by increasing awareness and providing training programs for governments and humanitarian organizations. She also made domestic violence prevention a major priority of the AWO, and called for greater public attention and reporting of violence against women in the home. In an interview in Trends Magazine, she asserted the importance of Arab women in sustainable development and bettering the Arab women's image were her main objectives as president of the AWO.

== Awards ==
She was recognized for her contributions to these organizations in a variety of publications. In 2000, she was selected as the "World Family Personality"; in 2003 deemed "Person of the Year" in the Russian magazine The World of the Woman, for her activities to promote social welfare and women's rights; and chosen as one of the world's 50 most influential Arabs by Middle East Magazine, a publication based in London. She was commended for her work with the AWO to increase women's capacity in all fields and positions, and for increasing cooperation among Arab states on women's issues. She was also recognized by the World Association of Women Entrepreneurs (FCEM) for her role in empowering women in economic development.

== Corruption ==
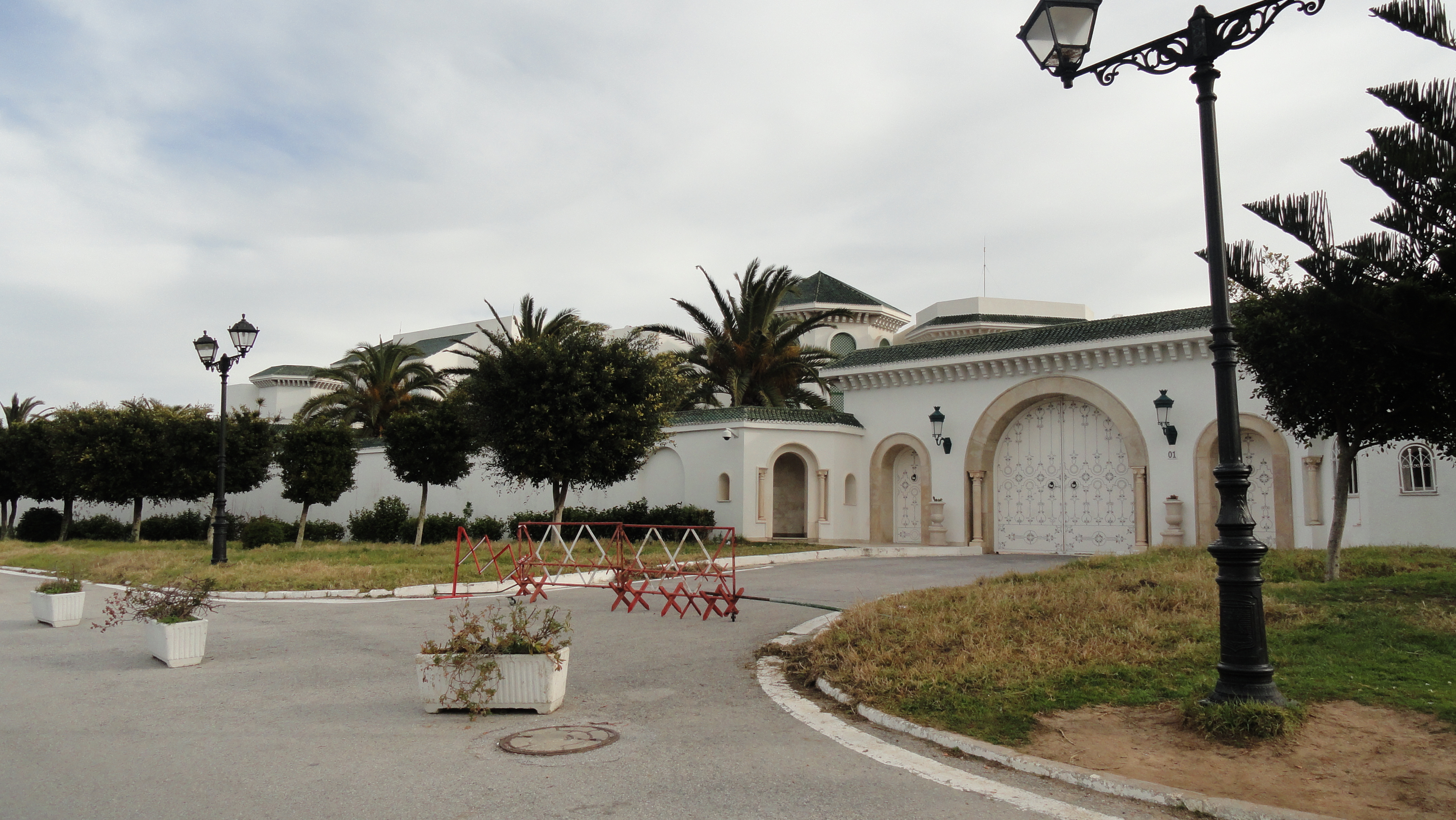
Entrance to Leila's and Ben Ali's palace built in Sidi Bou Said, in 2002

She became a lightning rod for dissatisfaction within a Tunisian society disgusted with the rise of her immediate family and Trabelsi family. Two French authors wrote an extensive book titled "La regente de Carthage" detailing the corruption of Leïla, her family and in-laws. According to the French newspaper Le Monde Diplomatique, Leïla Ben Ali symbolizes the "greed" of the presidential family. A leaked American diplomatic cable described how Ambassador Robert F. Godec often heard "barbs about their lack of education, low social status and conspicuous consumption." During the 2010–2011 Tunisian protests, rioters specifically targeted homes they believed belonged to the Trabelsi extended family. It was reported that Leïla Ben Ali removed 1.5 tons of gold bars (worth about $66 million) from the Central Bank of Tunisia (representing half of the Tunisian gold reserves) before fleeing the country when her husband was ousted on 14 January 2011; however, the removal was denied by the bank. The Swiss government announced that it was freezing millions of dollars held in bank accounts by her family.

On 20 June 2011, Zine El Abidine Ben Ali and Leïla Ben Ali were sentenced to 35 years in prison in absentia after being found guilty of theft and unlawful possession of cash and jewellery.

As of November 2022, she was sentenced to a total of 60 years in prison.

== Personal life ==
She and her husband had three children together: Nesrine (born out of wedlock; recognized by her father, married to Mohammad Sakher El Materi), Halima and Mohamed Zine El Abidine. The couple were together until 19 September 2019, when the former president died in Saudi Arabia.

Honorary titles
Preceded by Naïma Ben Ali	First Lady of Tunisia; 1992–2011	Succeeded by Lilia Mebazaa
