= Carthage Palace =

Presidential palace in Tunisia

- قصر قرطاج
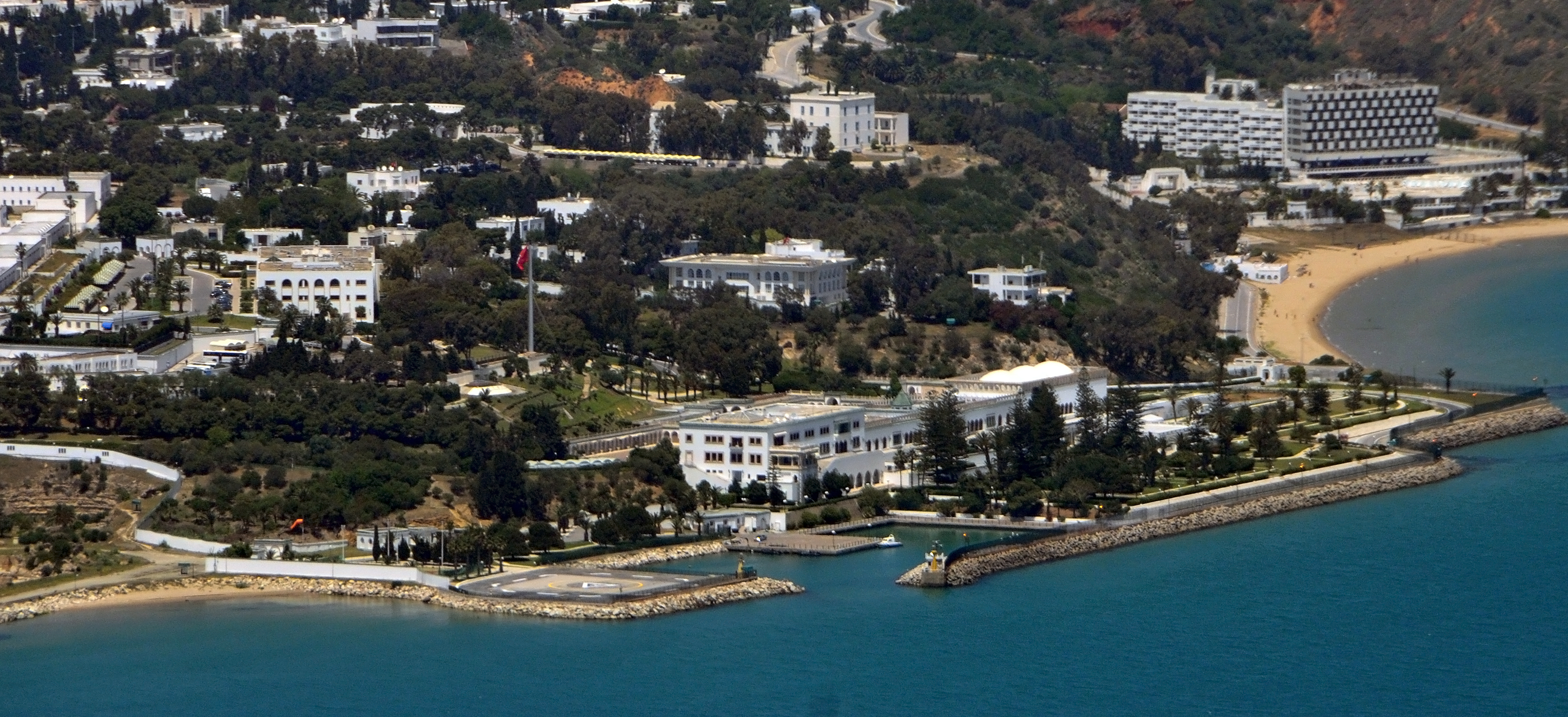
- Aerial view of the presidential palace from the Gulf of Tunis
- Former names: French Resident-General's Palace

General information
- Location: Carthage, Tunisia, Route of La Goulette, Carthage archaeological site
- Coordinates: 36°51′25″N 10°20′19″E
- Current tenants: Kais Saied (2019–present)
- Construction started: 1960
- Completed: 1969
- Owner: Government of Tunisia

Technical details
- Floor count: 4
- Floor area: 40 Hectares

Design and construction
- Architect: Olivier-Clément Cacoub

Website
- www.carthage.tn

Carthage Palace (Arabic: قصر قرطاج) is the presidential palace of Tunisia, and the official residence and seat of the President of Tunisia. It is located along the Mediterranean Sea in the commune of Carthage, near the archaeological site of the ancient city, fifteen kilometers from Tunis. A house by Le Corbusier sits within the site.

== Complex ==
The palace complex has four parts: the palace proper, consisting of the central building and a private wing housing two apartments, a building for presidential security and two other buildings, one of which is used for common, administrative and financial services, and general.

Within the complex is the residence of the Swiss ambassador, a building ceded by Bourguiba after an attempted coup in 1962, as well as the archaeological site called "fountain with a thousand amphorae".

== History ==
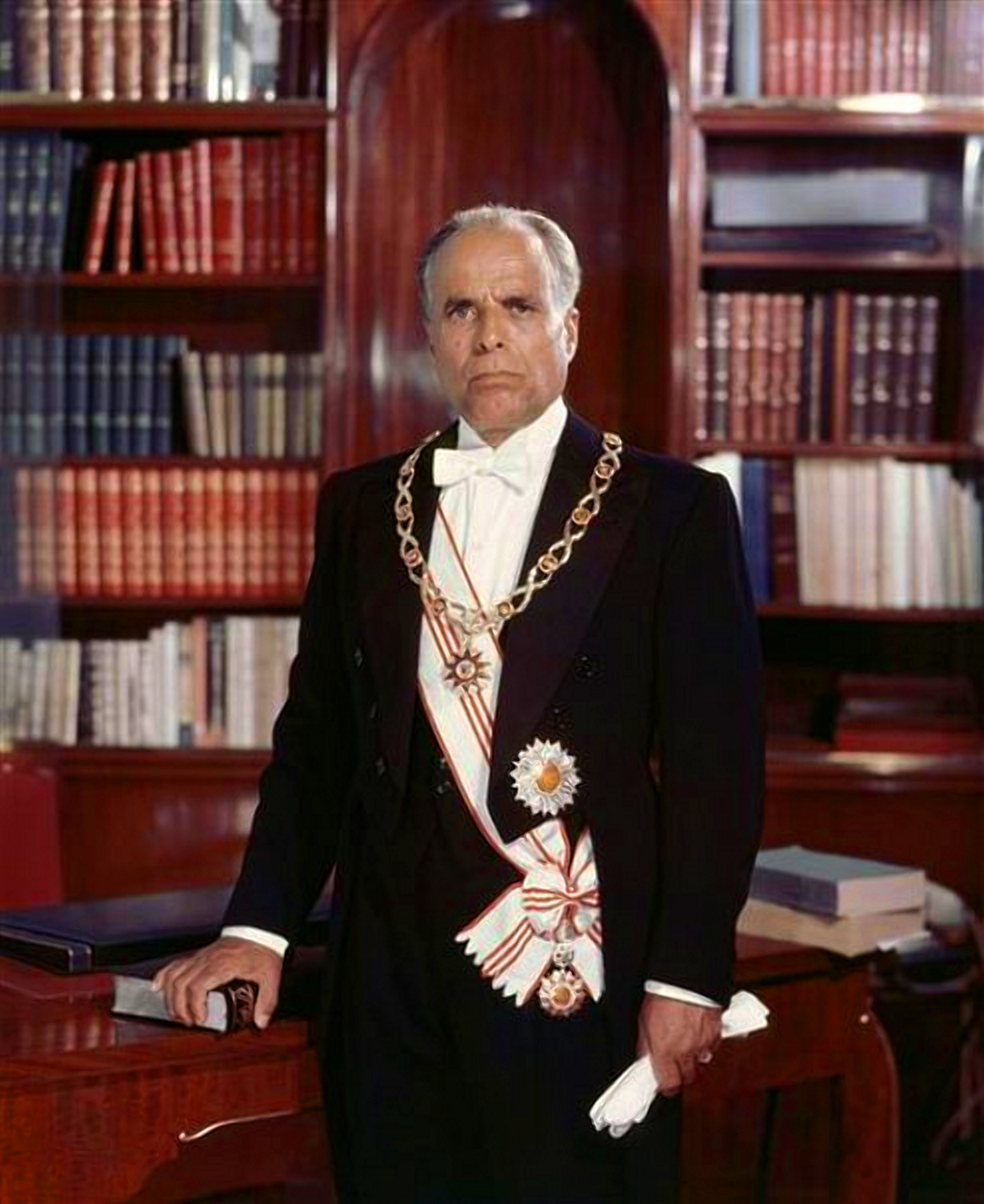
Habib Bourguiba was the first resident of the palace.

Originally, the palace park sheltered a residence of Mustapha Khaznadar. It became the property of an Italian (Mario Cignoni) in 1937. The residence was occupied by the Allies of World War II in 1943, then became the residence of the Secretary General of the Tunisian government, a French official responsible for controlling the ministers and the government of the Bey of Tunis.

Chosen by Bourguiba as the place of residence after the Essaâda palace in La Marsa, it replaced another palace in Carthage, located at the bottom of the hill, which was the main residence of the last bey of Tunis.

After the independence of Tunisia, Habib Bourguiba built a palace there according to his ambitions and to the extent of his cult of personality. The Bourguiba collection of numerous works to the glory of the leader is found in the basement of the palace and shown on Tunisian television after the 2011 revolution. The palace was built by the Franco-Tunisian architect Olivier-Clément Cacoub, in three sections over a period spread from 1960 to 1969, in Arab-Andalusian architectural style. The palace complex covers a total area of 38 to 40 hectares.

During Bourguiba's presidency, the palace served as his residence and workplace. His family lived there until the coup d'état of Zine El Abidine Ben Ali on 7 November 1987. Ben Ali refused to use the office of his predecessor and had a new one built, as well as another for his spouse Leïla Ben Ali.

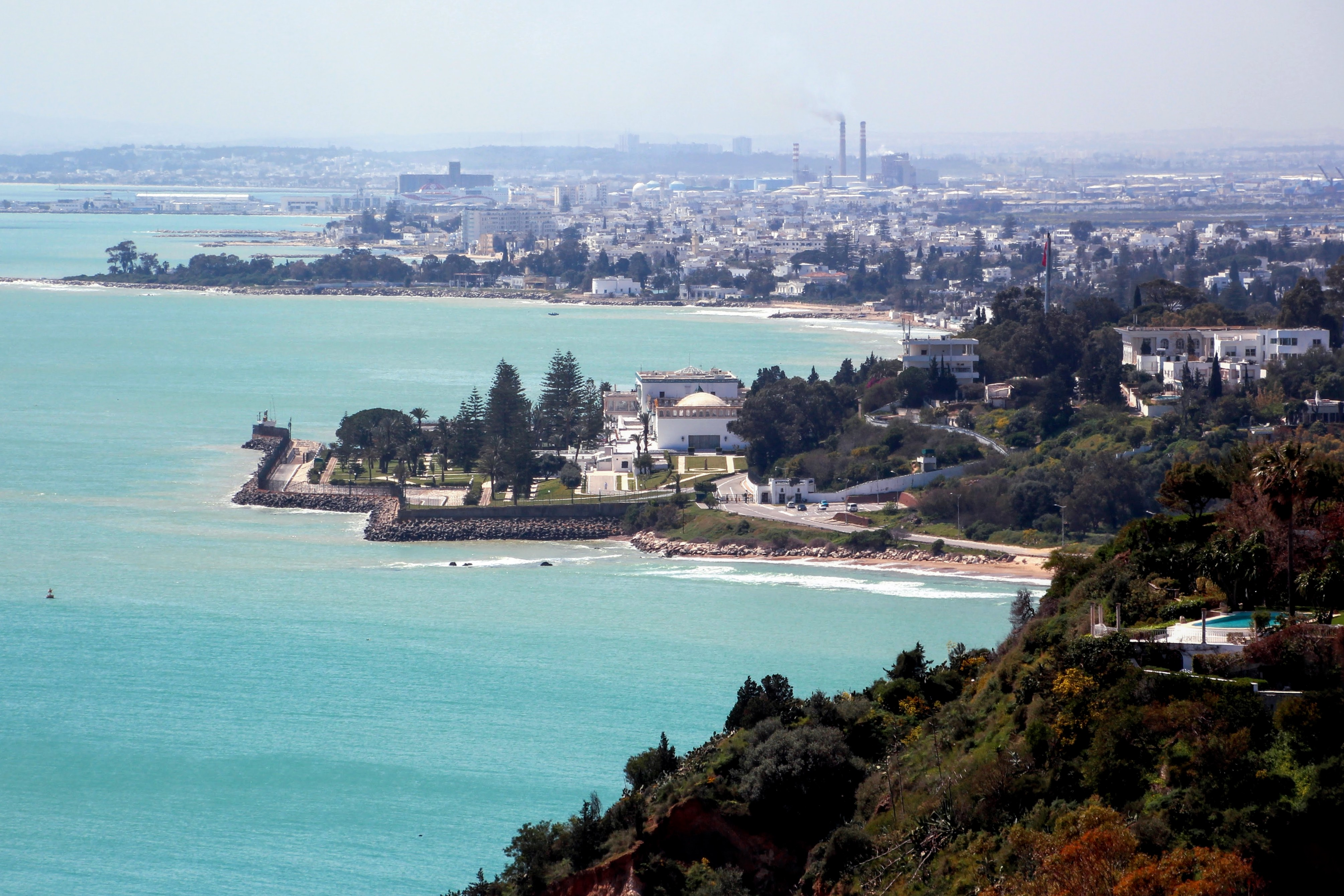
Carthage Palace from Sidi Bou Said.

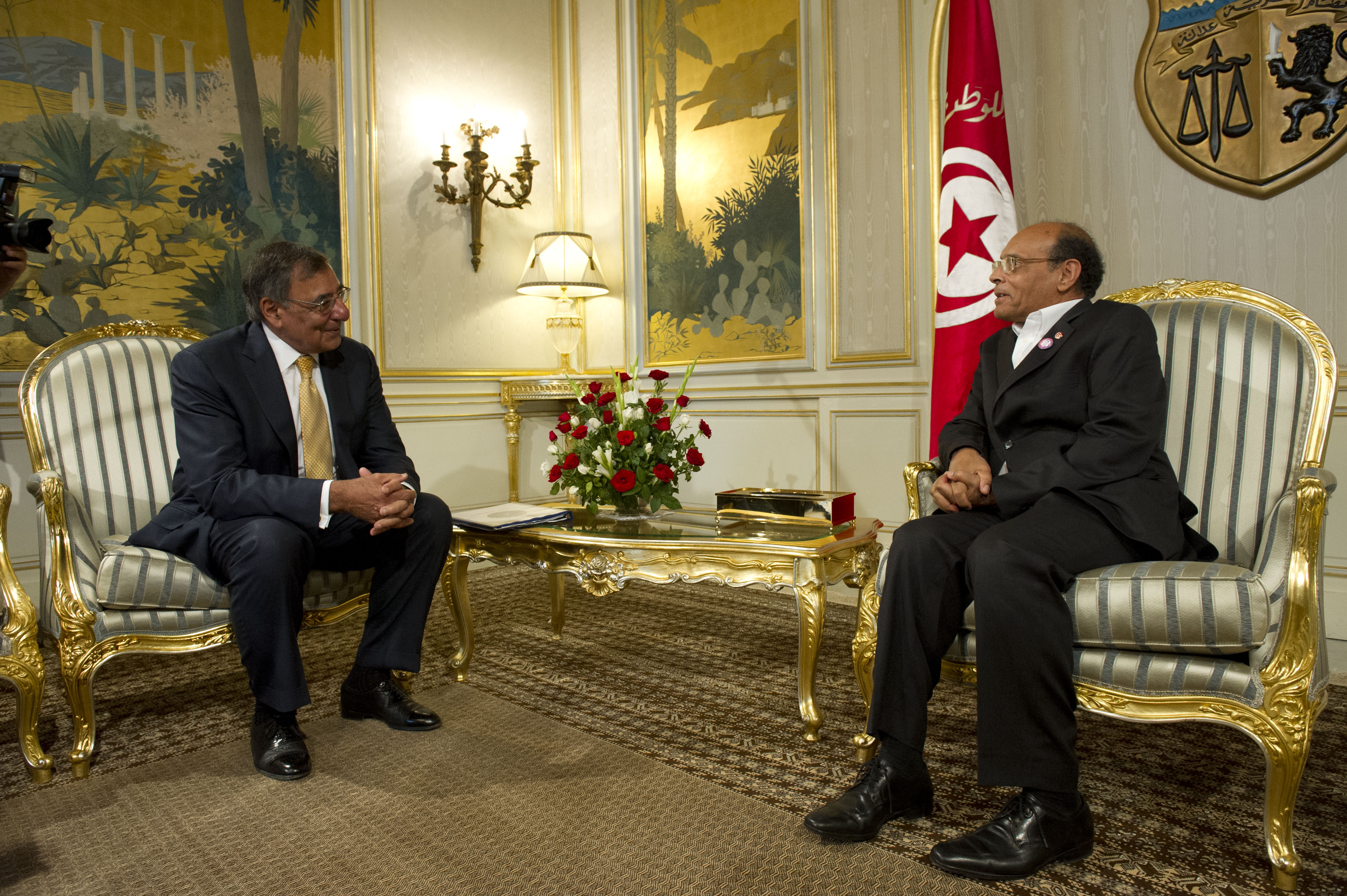
Secretary of Defense Leon E. Panetta, left, meets with Tunisian President Moncef Marzouki in Tunis, Tunisia, on July 29, 2012

He only uses the palace as a place of work, launching the construction of another palace to serve as his personal residence, although he sometimes resides in the apartments which he arranged, at the beginning of his presidency, in the private wing of the palace.

On 15 January 2011, one day after Ben Ali's flight during the revolution, the army stormed the palace which houses members of the presidential security who remained loyal to the ousted president.

Fouad Mebazaa, interim President of the Republic, following the flight of Ben Ali, decided to occupy the presidential offices of Carthage and announced his intention to settle there, as part of his duties.

Shortly after his election by the Constituent Assembly, Moncef Marzouki announced to the press his intention to work and reside within the palace itself. He decided to take over Bourguiba's office, installing portraits of Habib Bourguiba, Farhat Hached, Salah Ben Youssef, Mohamed Daghbaji, and Mohamed Bouazizi there.

== Interior architecture ==
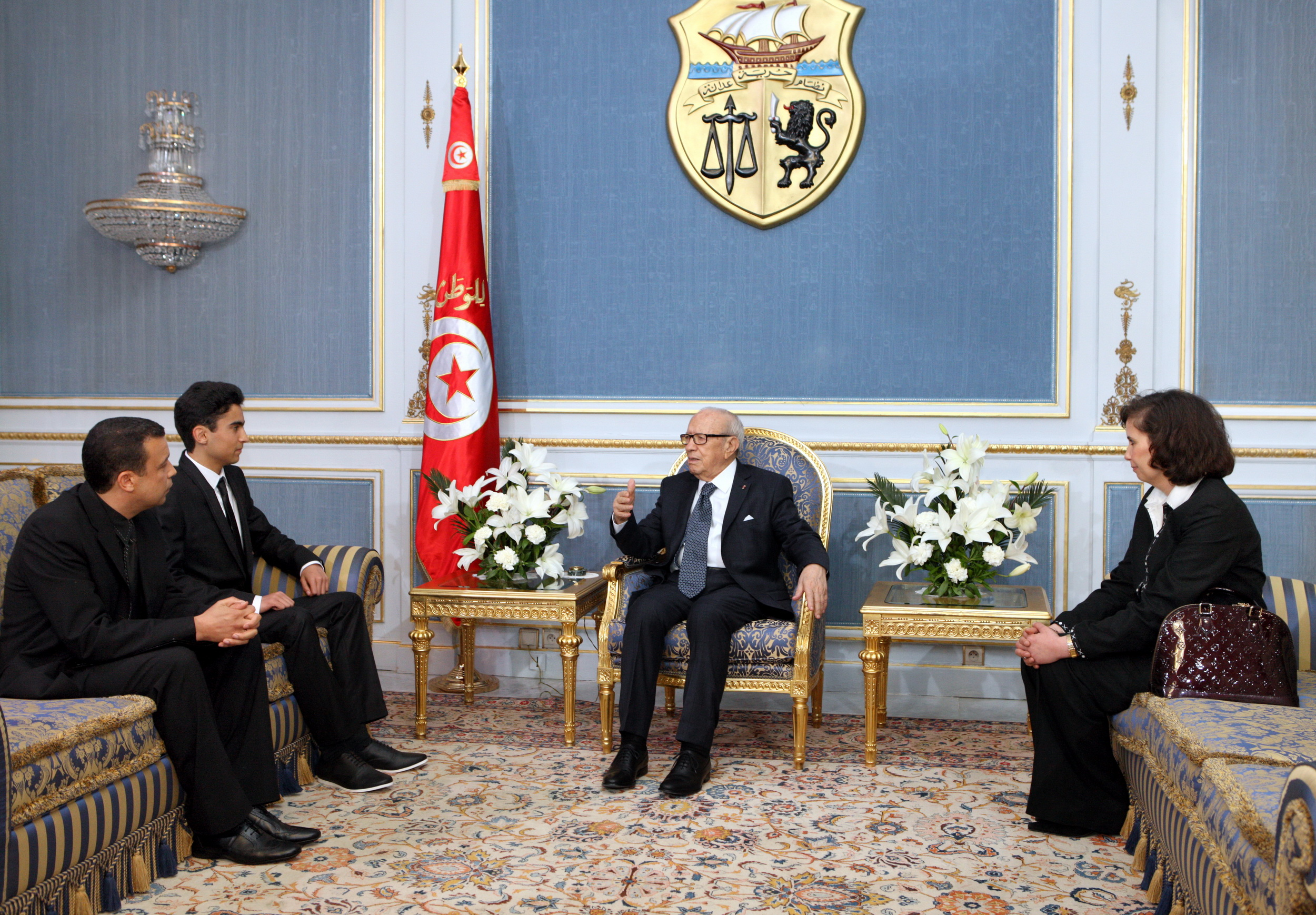
"Ibn Khaldun Hall" during the presidency of Beji Caid Essebsi.

The palace features rooms which take the name of Tunisian personalities who played a role in the history of the country such as Habib Bourguiba, Abdelaziz Thâalbi, Aboul-Qacem Echebbi and Dido.

In addition to the presence of a gallery in the palace belonging to the beys of the Husainid dynasty who ruled Tunisia from 1705 to 1957, the palace also contains several gifts gifted by foreign leaders and valuable items such as the table upon which the Treaty of Bardo was signed on 12 May 1881, which established the French protectorate of Tunisia. President Bourguiba was keen to bring this table to the presidential palace to proceed there and on the same day, on 12 May 1964, the law on agricultural evacuation, which means transferring the ownership of agricultural lands that the French had owned to the Tunisian government. It also contains a hall in which the President of the Republic receives foreign delegations and is called the "Republic Hall".

The palace contains a theater and a private presidential suite with bedroom, shower room and salon. Habib Bourguiba is the only president who used it.

Official receptions take place in the ambassadors' lounge, with delegations settling in the blue lounge, where a model of the Prophet's mosque` in Medina stands, presented by King Fahd of Saudi Arabia to Ben Ali.

== Staff ==
Some 3,000 people work at the palace, two-thirds of the national guards protecting the site and agents of the presidential security service.

== Gallery ==
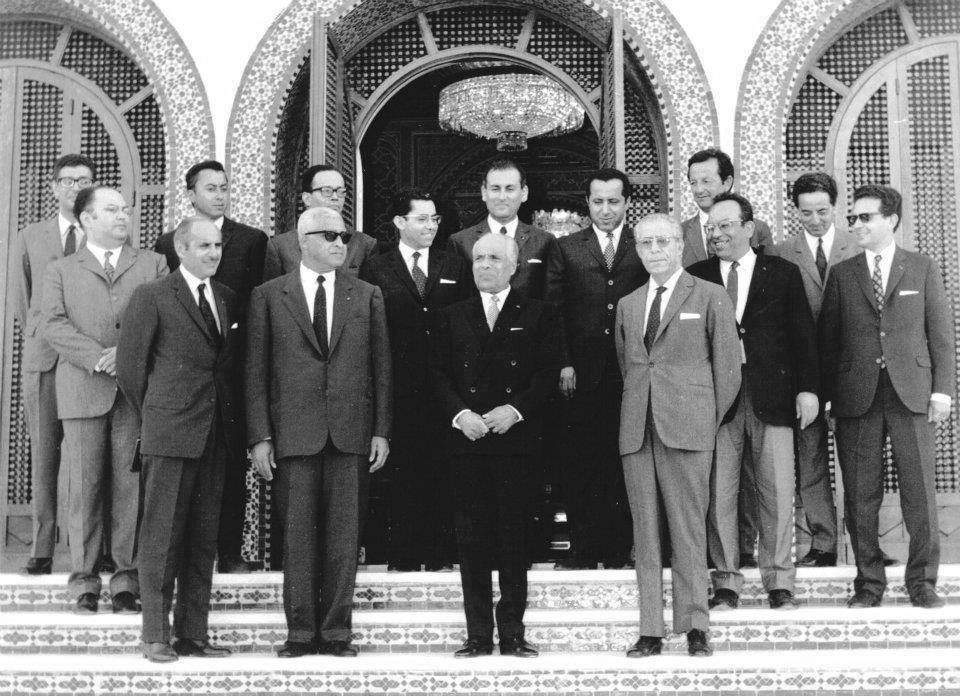
The Tunisian government in the garden of the palace in 1970

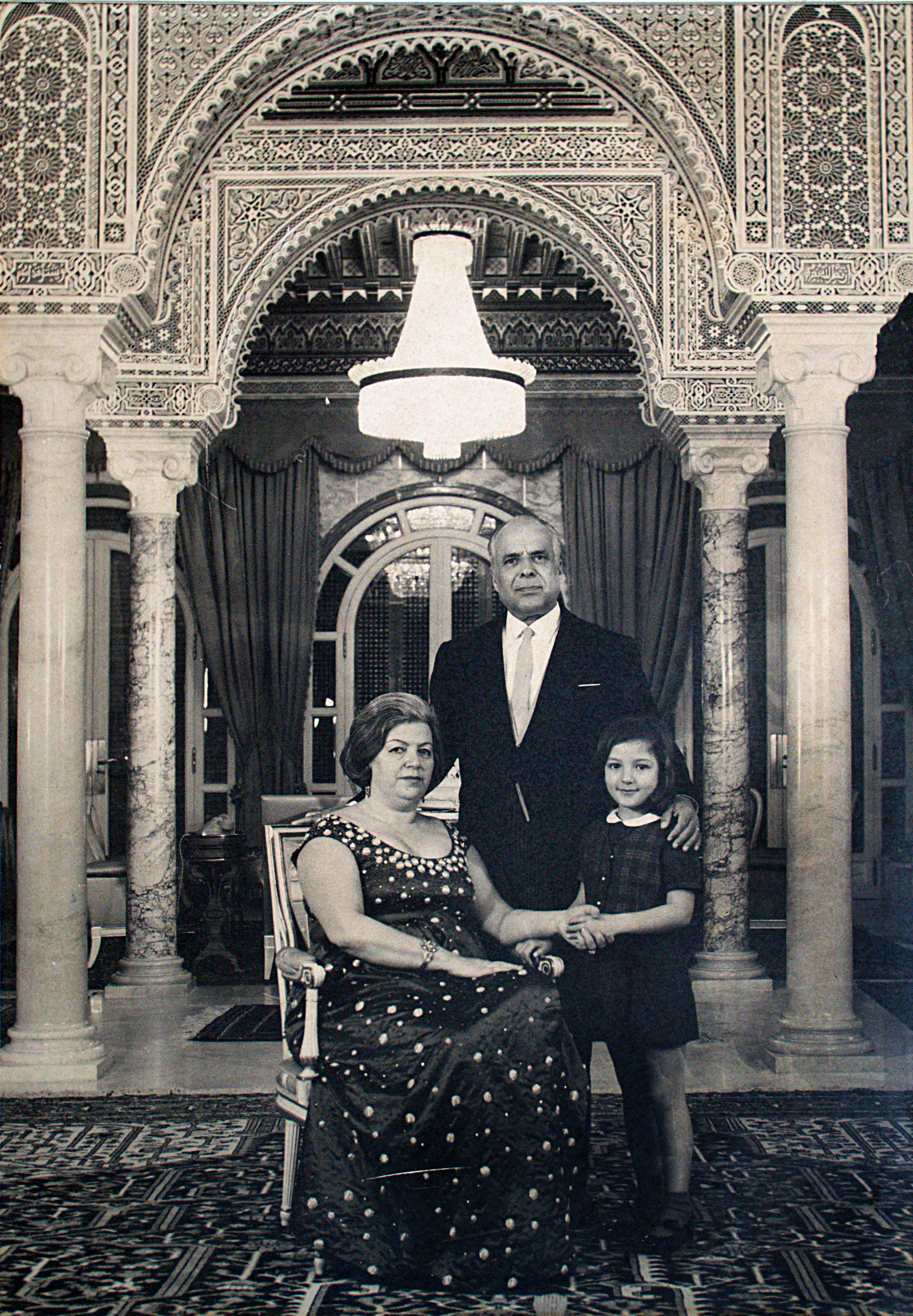
Bourguiba and his family in the lobby of the palace

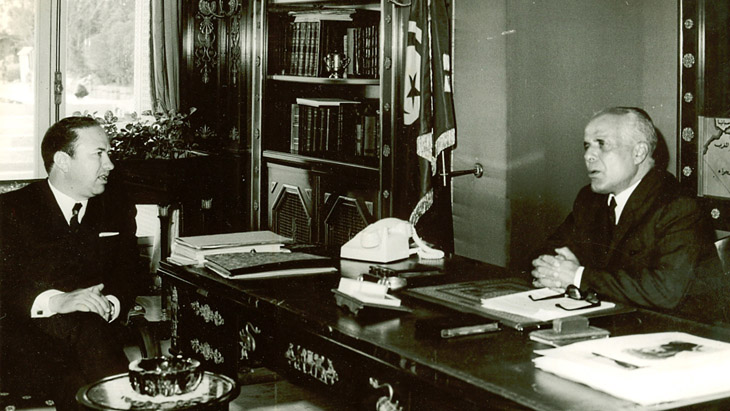
Bourguiba and Essebsi, who would become president decades later, in the "President's Office"

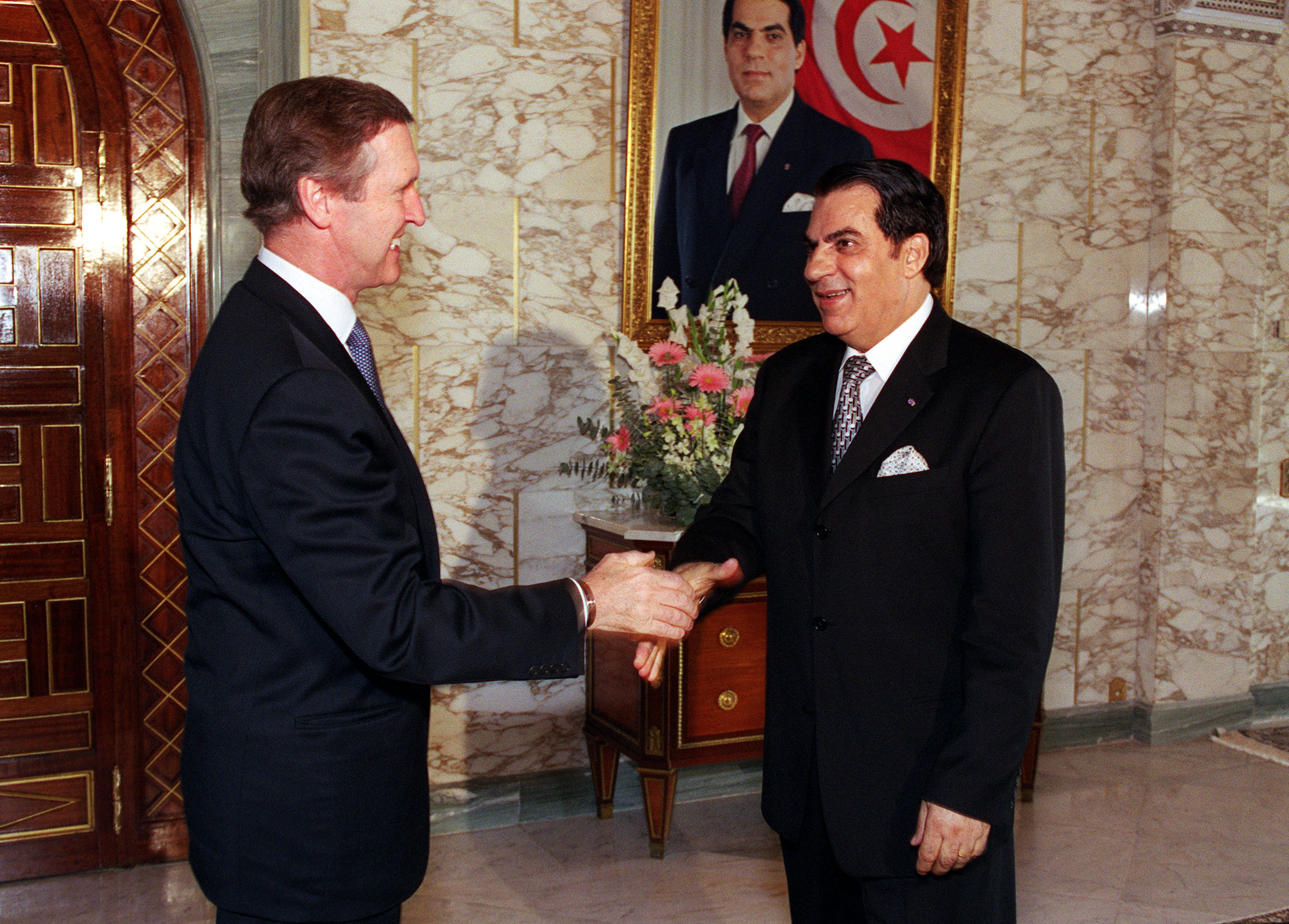
Ben Ali receiving delegations at the entrance to the palace

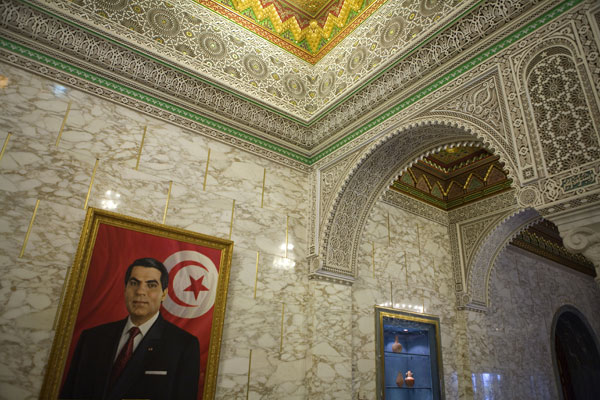
Portrait of Ben Ali in the lobby of the palace

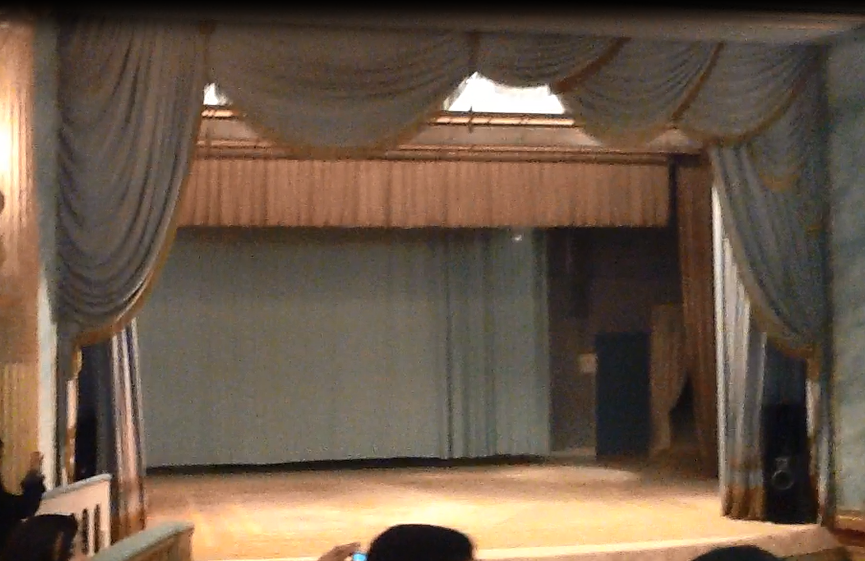
Theater of Carthage Palace

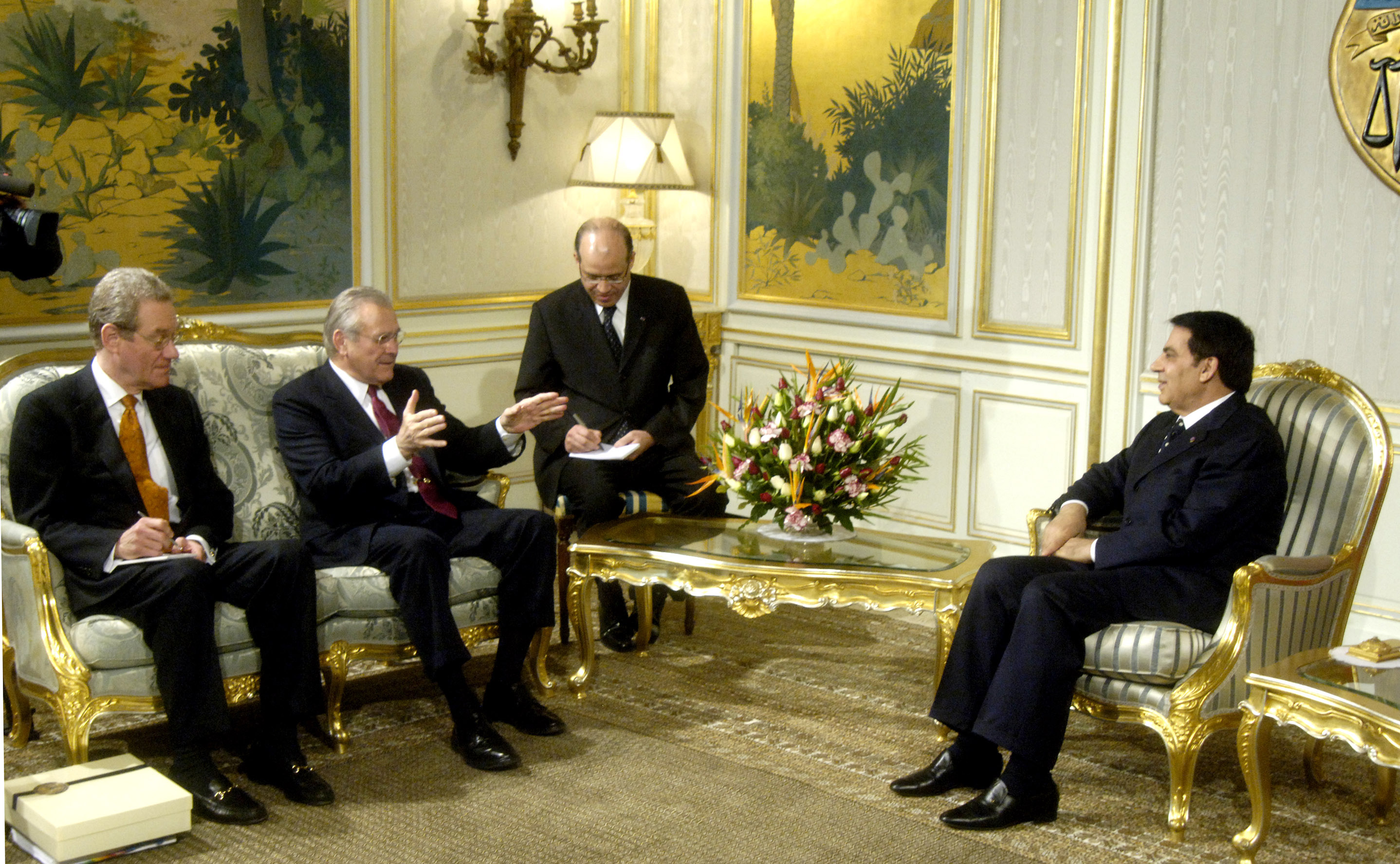
Ben Ali and the delegations in the hall of the Republic

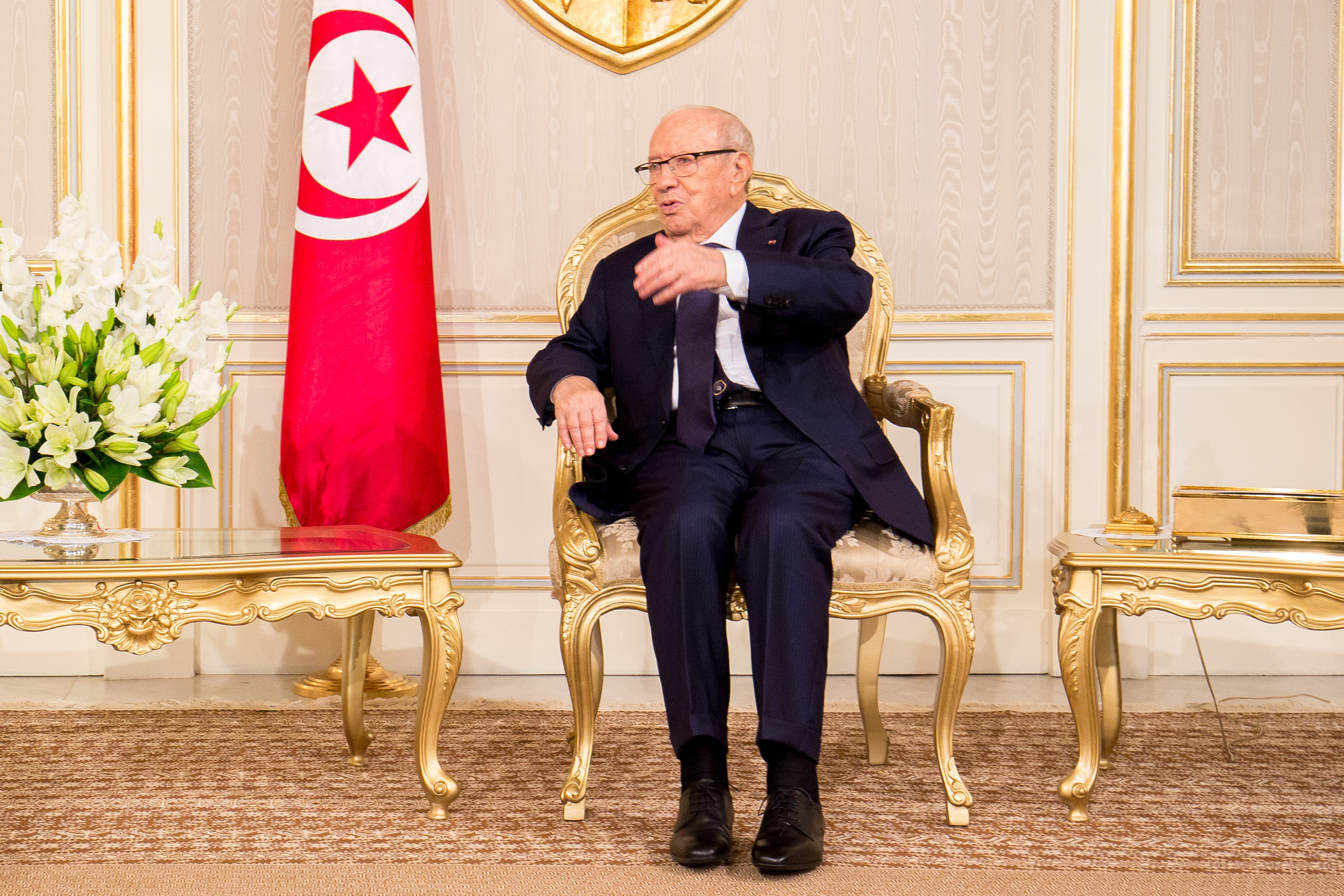
Essebsi at the "Republic Hall"

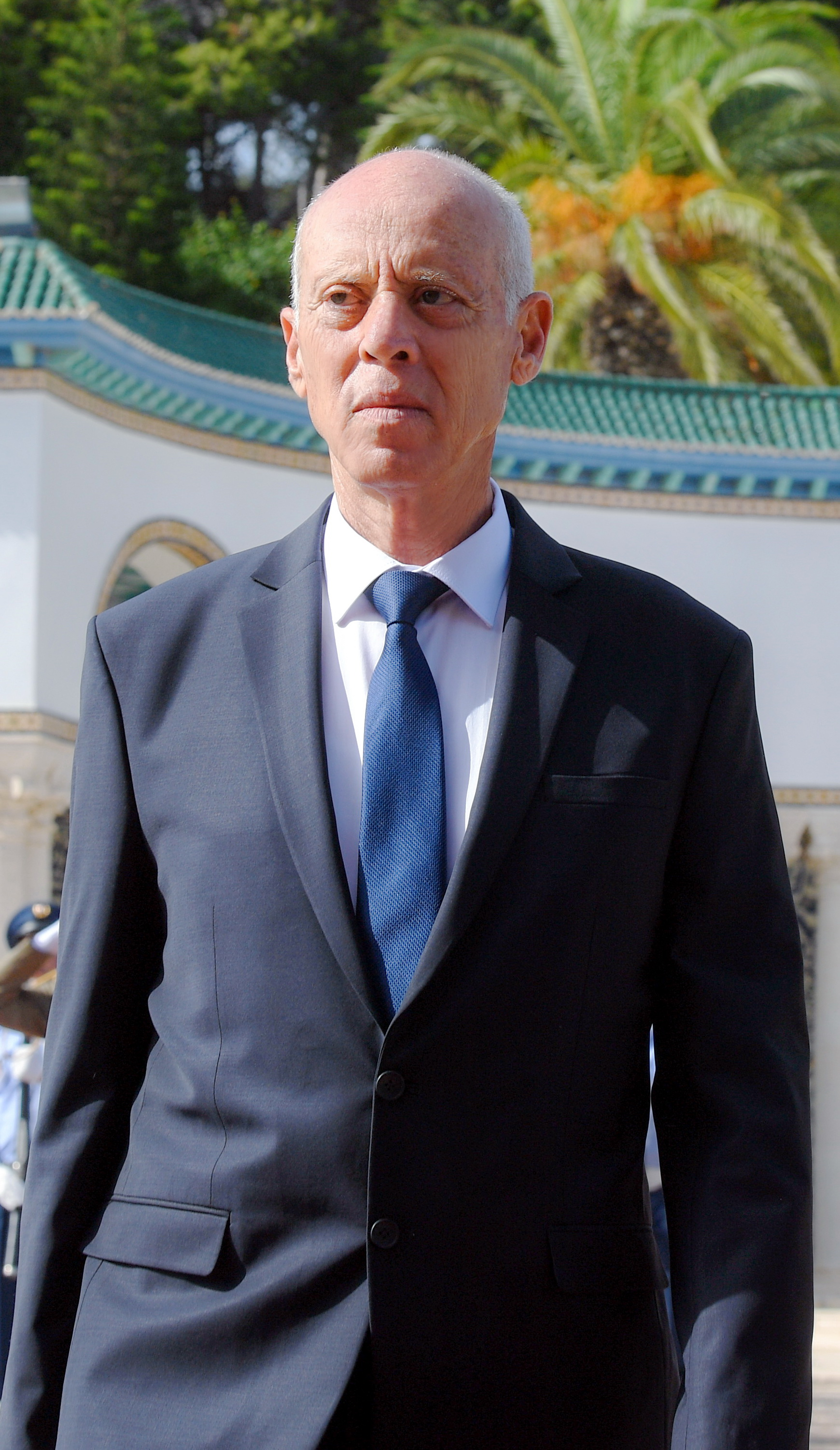
The courtyard of the palace during the arrival of Kais Saied to take over the presidency

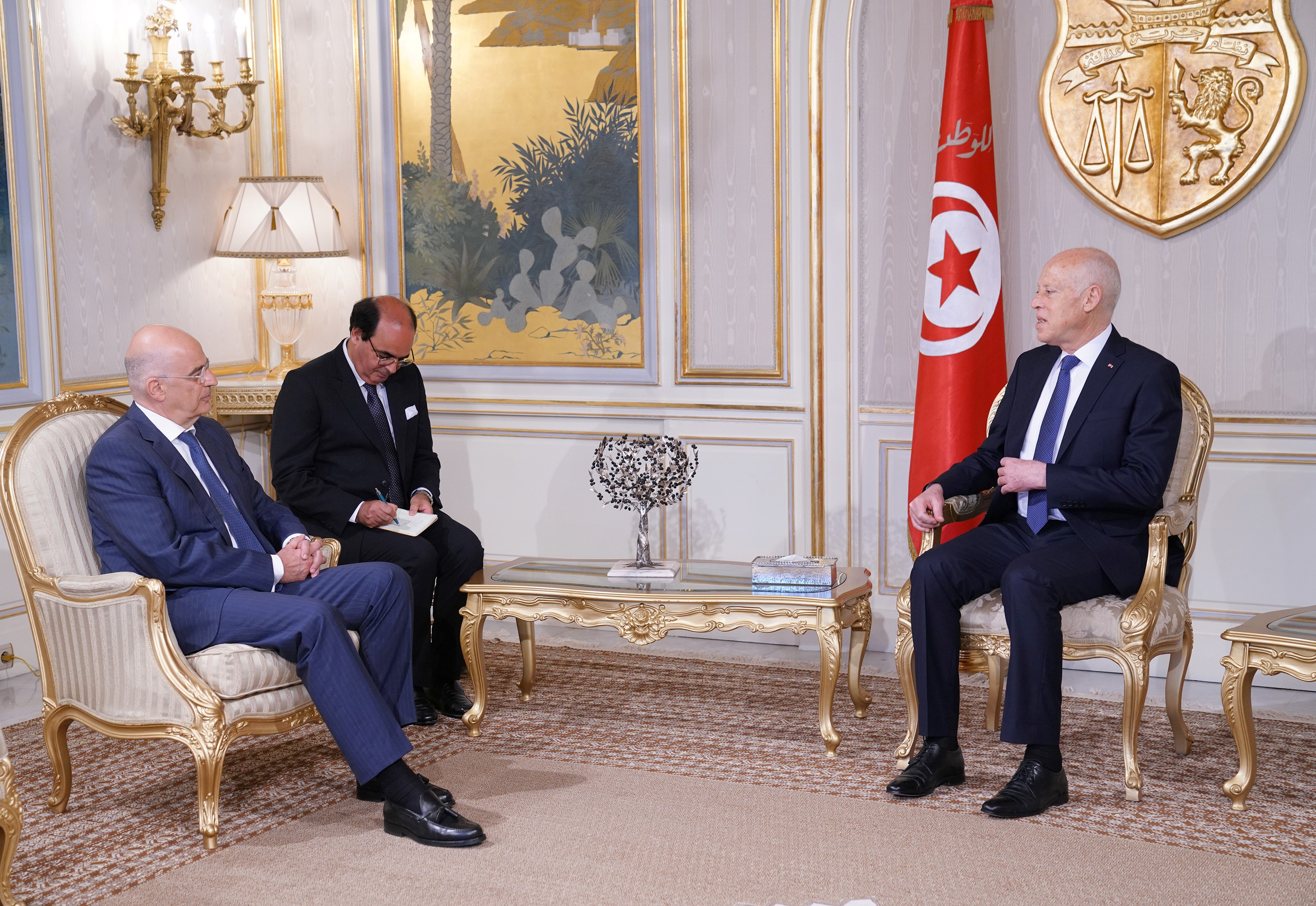
"Republic Hall" during the presidency of Kais Saied

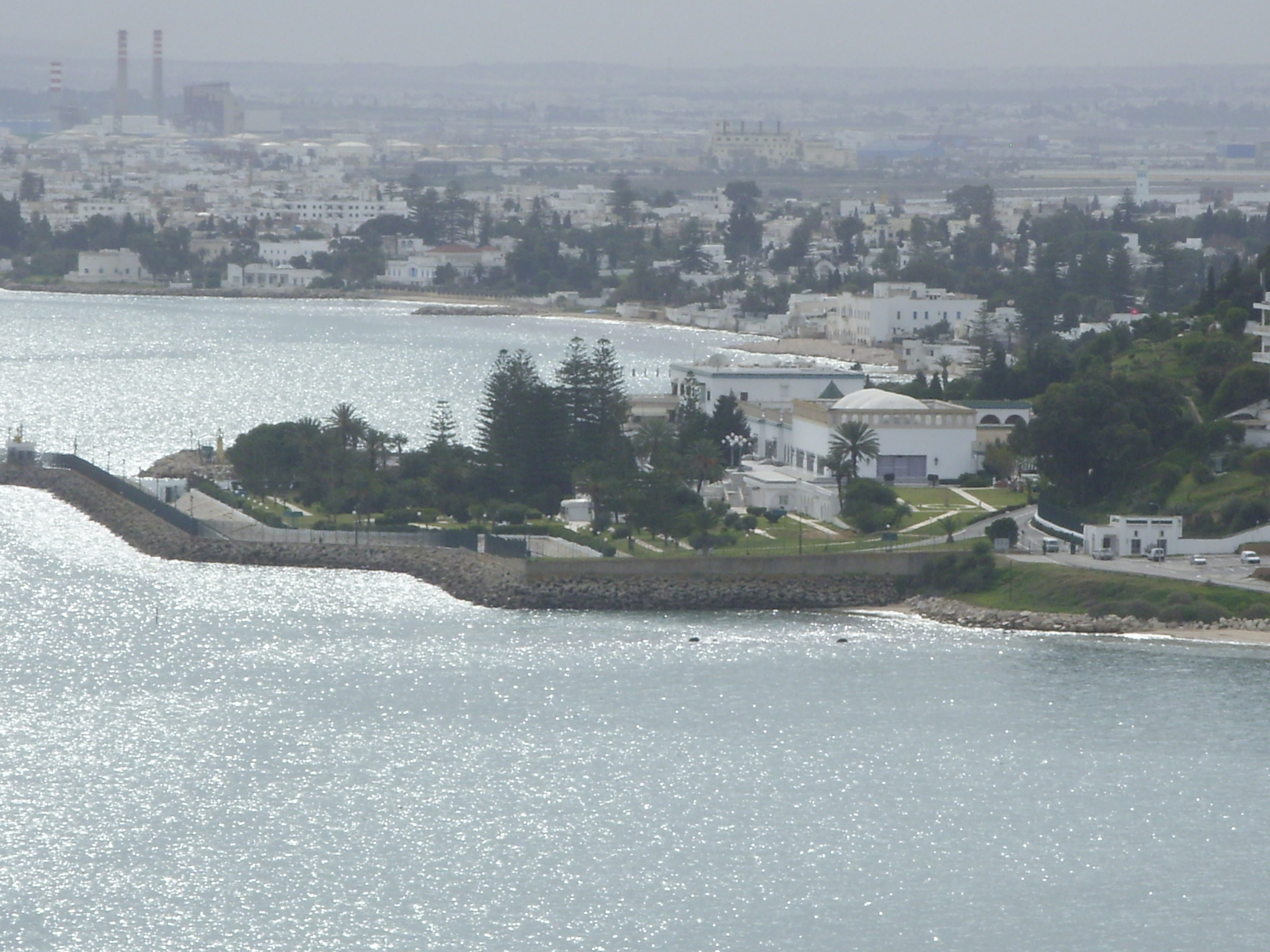
Aerial view of the palace

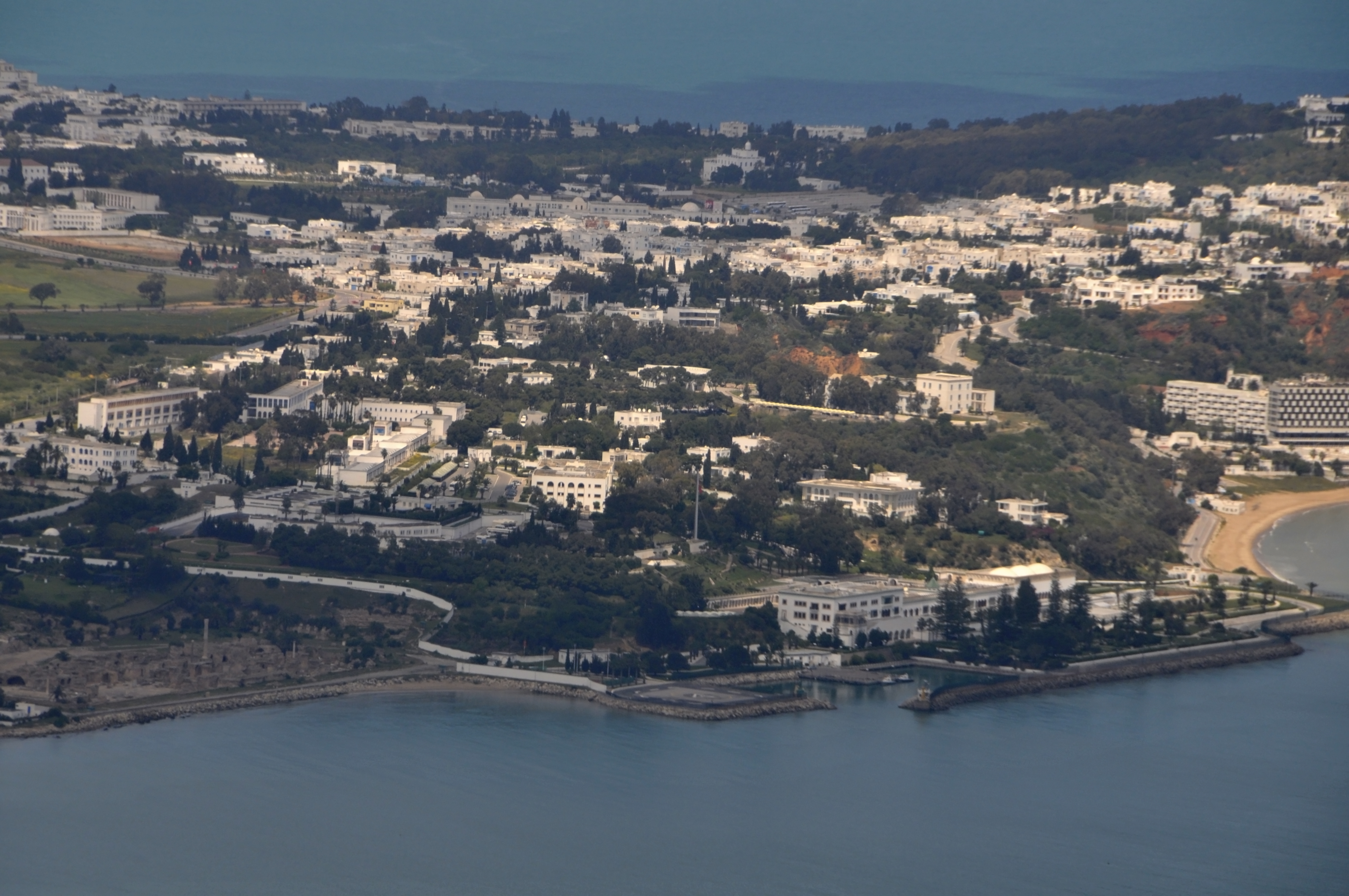
Presidential Palace of Carthage
