= Arab International Women's Forum =

The Arab International Women's Forum (Arabic: المنتدى العالمي للنساء العربيات) or AIWF is a London-based umbrella organisation which brings together 1,500 associations, individuals, corporations and partnerships from 45 countries. The AIWF aims to bring equal rights to men and women in the workforce, and in society in general.

== History ==
The Forum was founded in 2001 by Haifa Fahoum Al Kaylani, who began with the vision of helping Arab women become "part and parcel of the international community". She put together a formal network of Arab and international businesswomen as well as female community leaders to expand the role of women in the global marketplace and decision-making. Al Kaylani is also member of the Suzanne Mubarak Women's International Peace Movement and is also a member of the Women's Leadership Board at the Harvard University.

The AIWF 2005 report called Engines of economic growth in the Arab world suggested that Arab men be given paternal leave from work to look after children rather than leaving all the work to women, through role balancing.

In 2011, the AIWF launched the Young Arab Women Leaders initiative to specifically support young Arab women. The 10th edition was held in 2017 at the London Royal Academy of Engineering.

== Description ==
One idea is that women are given educational and working opportunities meaning that they will be able to make their mark in society as a whole and as individuals. By allowing women to educate themselves and give them more access to computers, technology and university scholarships, they can achieve business, educational and governmental roles. Businesses and organisations have been able to contact and associate with people in their same position located in other countries. Arab women residing in Britain and Europe can now make business engagements with ladies in the Middle East giving them more potential for business and community work and profit.
