= Early life of Habib Bourguiba =

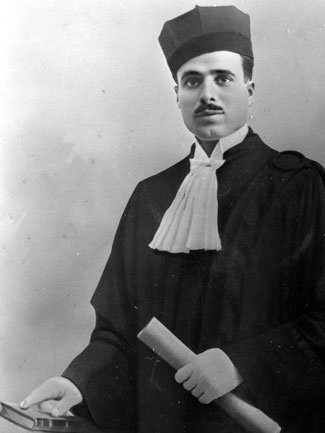
Bourguiba photographed in his lawyer robes circa 1927

Habib Bourguiba was officially born on August 3, 1903, in Monastir to Ali Bourguiba (1850–1925) and Fattouma Khefacha (1861–1913). Being their eighth and last child, his birth was a shame to his mother and a worry to his father, who conceived him in an advanced age. Born into a modest family, the young Habib was raised in a female environment and was marked by gender inequality. Despite his financial conditions, Ali Bourguiba decided to invest his money in the education of his son and therefore, avoid him his fate of being enrolled in the army. Likewise, he sent his son to Tunis, c. 1907, to live with his brother M'hamed, in order to study in elementary school of Sadiki. Separated from his mother at 5, he lived in modest conditions in the capital city, and the Jellaz Affair made a deep impression on him. In 1913, he obtained his Certificat d'études primaires to the relief of his father, exempting him from military service and permitted him to pursue his secondary education in Sadiki. However, in the same year, he lost his mother at the age of 10, which marked his entire life.

While Bourguiba began his secondary education, World War I started. If his was studious, he soon had health issues in his final year of studies because of the budget restrictions imposed by the school to support war effort. In order to heal, he was sent to his brother Muhammed, who lived in Kef. Influenced by colonial inequalities, he decided to pursue with law studies and therefore, fight against the French protectorate. Supported by his brother Mahmoud, who enrolled him in the French Lycée Carnot. Two events in which he was part during his youth made a strong impression on him: The return of Abdelaziz Thâalbi from exile and the protests of April 5, 1922, which increased his nationalist aspirations. In 1924, he got his baccalaureate, as valedictorian and flew to Paris in order to pursue his Higher education.

In the French capital city, he enrolled in the Law school of Sorbonne and spent his time discovering the colonial civilization to "arm himself intellectually" against it. There, he met Mathilde Lefras, a fourteen-year older widow, with whom he had a relationship. In 1927, when he obtained a law licence, Mathilde gave birth to their son, Habib Jean Bourguiba. When he returned to Tunisia, Bourguiba married Moufida and searched for a job as a lawyer, to provide the needs of family. He quickly started a journalistic career in order to defend the Tunisian personality.

== Ancestry ==
=== Paternal family ===
Bourguiba's paternal family originated from the Ottoman Empire nobility. In Albanian, Bourguiba meant "prisoner". The family lived in Istanbul before leaving the city for the Sirte coast in Libya. In 1795, the great-grandfather of Habib Bourguiba, Hadj Mohamed Bourguiba Al Kebir, left Tripolitania to settle in Tunisia, because of the eruption of troubles between Libya and the Ottoman Empire. Therefore, he moved to Monastir, in the "Tripolitanian quarter" with his family, wealth, fishers, his forty slaves and his doctor. Since then, Mohamed Bourguiba got richer and richer, aiding those in need and becoming known for his generosity. In 1805, his son Mohamed II was born. When his father died, Mohamed II inherited his wealth and then fructified it, becoming known, like his Mohamed El Kebir, for his help to the poor.

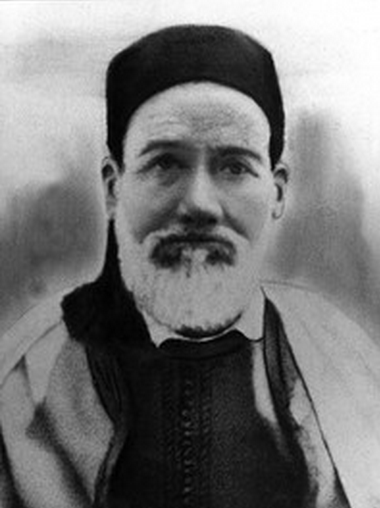
A portrait of Ali Bourguiba, father of Habib.

Years after they moved to Monastir, the Husainid Dynasty made many reforms for Tunisia to avoid the fate of Ottoman Algeria who had just being colonized by France, in 1830. The reforms included the establishment of new institutions in order to compete with Europe. But this attempt was a complete failure and ended with a financial crisis. In order to repay foreign loans, the Tunisian government raised the taxes of the mejba. But this resulted in dissatisfaction of the Tunisian people who decided to revolt in 1864. The uprising ended with a terrible repression: The bey decided to punish any person who had participated in the event. Therefore, the bey sent general Ahmed Zarrouk to Monastir in order to pacify the situation. Thus, he arrested the city's notables, including Mohamed Bourguiba and his brother, who were detained in a beylical camp settled at the west of the city. They were freed only with the family's efforts who sacrificed all their wealth, jewelry, money and properties. The youngest of Mohamed Bourguiba's sons, Ali, who was only 14, was responsible for bringing the ransom to the general's tent. He was noticed by Zarrouck who saw in him a good recruit for his troops and decided to enroll him in the army. Therefore, Ali spent 19 years of his life campaigning, before ending his military career with the rank of sergeant-in-chief and a quarterly pension of 11.25 francs. However, Mohamed Bourguiba died on the very night he got back home, in 1865.

When he left the army, France had just taken full control over the country, with the signature of the Bardo Treaty on May 12, 1881, and the Conventions of La Marsa of June 8, 1883, which established the French protectorate with the approval of Sadok Bey. One year before its establishment, Ali Bourguiba, who was 30 years old, married Fattouma Khefacha, daughter of Ahmed Khefacha and Khadouja Mzali, which linked the Bourguiba family to the Mzali one (family of Habib Bourguiba's future prime minister Mohamed Mzali). Impoverished, the family was no more part of the local nobility. The family house was inhabited by the three children of Mohamed Bourguiba: his daughter Emna, who married Ahmed Sakka, his second son Hassan, and Ali and his wife. Fattouma gave to six boys – Mohamed, Ahmed, M'hamed, Mahmoud, Younes who died at 3 months and later Habib – and two daughters – Nejia who had almost married the father of Mohamed Mzali and Aicha.

In this context, the familial life of the three siblings was characterized by numerous arguments. Each of the siblings occupying a room, many fights started between sisters-in-law, their children or even the three children of Mohamed Bourguiba. Years later, Bourguiba stated that during one fight, his father draw his sword to threaten his brother Mohamed, who was armed with a gun and insisted on the numerous quarrels between sisters-in-law, jealous of Ali's wife, Fattouma who gave birth to six boys. With only one kitchen in the house, the women gathered to cook food together. Once, one of Habib's aunts by marriage, threw a handful of salt into Fattouma's cooking pot. Due to this, Ali was fed up with the unceasing tensions and decided to move out of his father's house. Appointed sheikh of the "Tripolitanian quarter" then councilman and agricultural expert, he could improve his family's conditions and move into a modest house known as Dar El Kouij and located on the cliff named Karrayia ( "Black holy" in Turkish) where they lived a year before moving into their own house. Its construction was supervised by Ahmed Sakka, the husband of his paternal aunt, Emna.

=== Maternal family ===
Fattouma Khefacha, was born in 1861 to Khadouja Mzali and Ahmed Khefacha. When she was very young, her parents divorced. Bourguiba, who had always criticized repudiation in Islam, stated in 1973, that the reason of the divorce was "futile". Indeed, the divorce took place because Khadouja presented a cold meal to her husband. Once separated, Ahmed married another woman and founded a new family. Khadouja then, had no choice but to get back to her parents' place, in the "Tripolitanian quarter". It was in that house that Fattouma was raised, her mother refusing to remarry. In 1880, at the age of 15 or 16 years old, Fattouma married Ali Bourguiba, and upon the instance of her mother, wedded in her father's house, before parting for that of her groom. Khadouja, whose father died in 1884, moved into her daughter's house where they cohabited. Therefore, she helped with house chores, participating in supplies preparations and wool washing, at the seaside. She had a good relationship with her sister, Aïchoucha Mzali, mother of the famous Abelaziz al-Aroui, who lived at the end of the same street. Despite that, Bourguiba stated that "in reality, there wasn't much of a relationship between my family and that of mother, that it to say, that of Ahmed Khefacha, who, as I said, had remarried. However, one day, when going across a nearby square, known today as independence square, where there had been a grand café, my father, who held my hand, told me to go kiss my grandfather, while designating a ruddy faced old man. So I did what I was told and kissed him".

=== Family tree ===
Bourguiba family tree

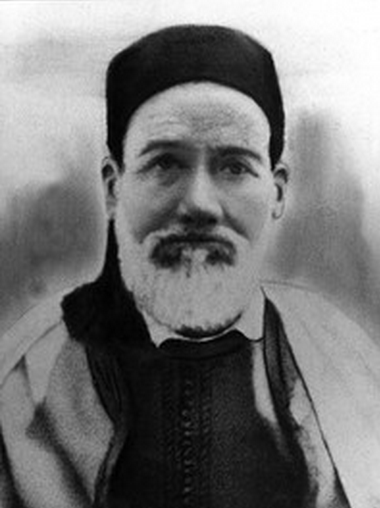
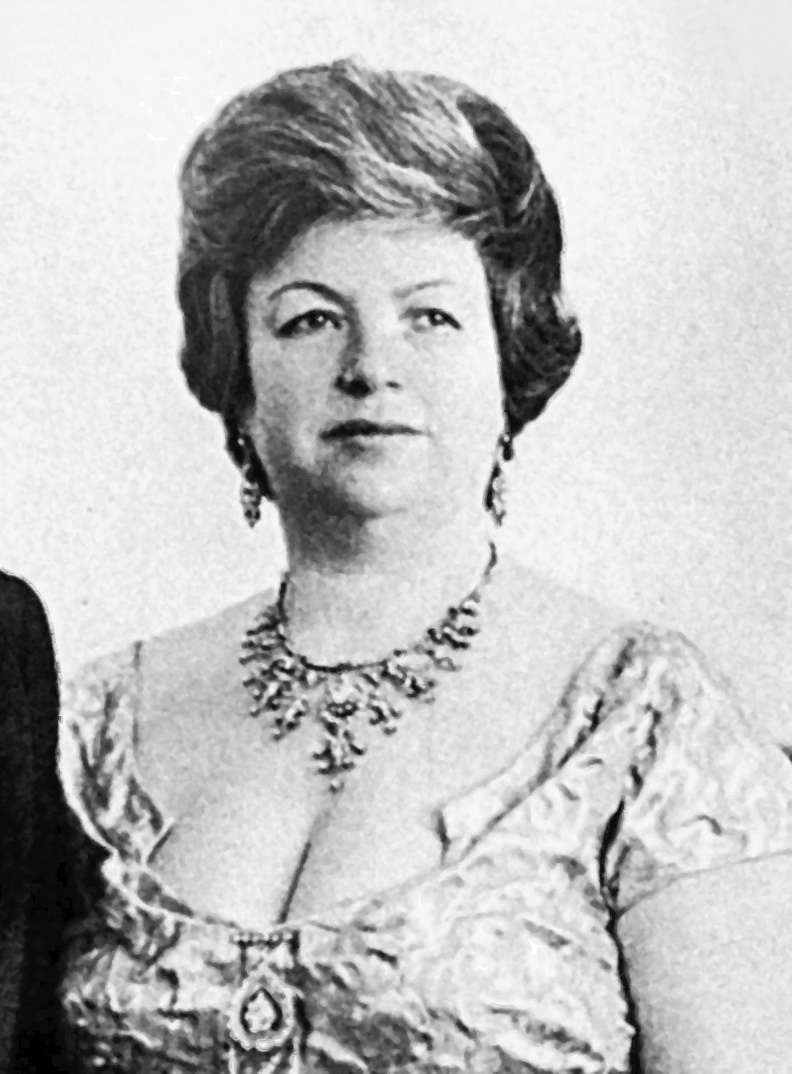
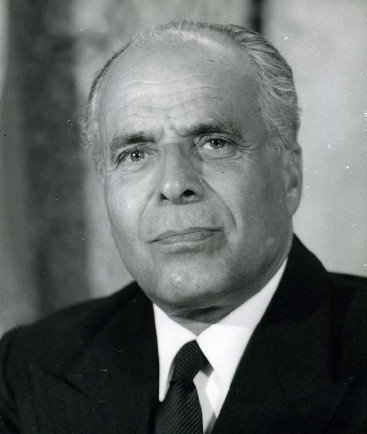
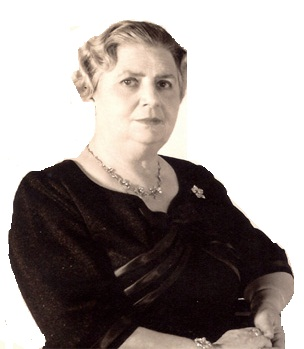
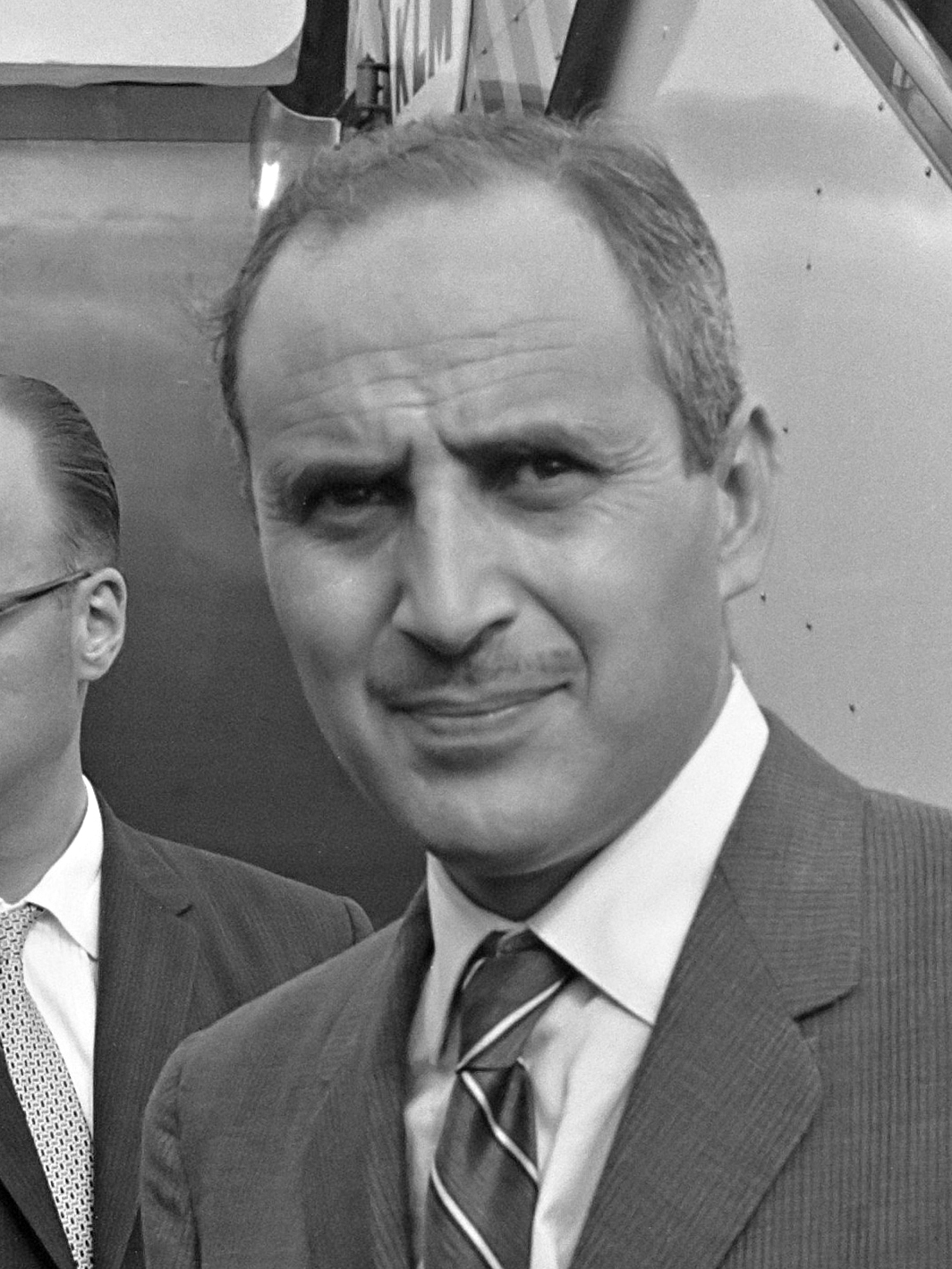
Hadj Mohamed; Bourguiba (b. 1795 – a. 1805)	Mrs. Hadj Mohamed Bourguiba(b. 1795 – ?)
Mohamed II; Bourguiba (1805–1865)	Mrs. Bourguiba; Sakka (b. 1840 – a. 1865)	Ahmed; Khefacha (b. 1961 – ?)	Khadouja; Mzali (b. 1961 – a. 1913)
Ali; Bourguiba (1850–1925)	Fattouma; Khefacha (1861–1913)
Wassila; Ben Ammar (1912–1999)	Habib; Bourguiba (1903–2000)	Moufida (Mathilde); Lorrain (1890–1976)	Mohamed; Bourguiba (1883–1930)	M'hamed; Bourguiba (1885–1953)	Mahmoud; Bourguiba (? – 1953)	Nejia; Bourguiba Bouzgarou (1881–1976)	Aïcha; Bourguiba (1885–1953)
Hajer; Bourguiba (b. ?)	Habib Jean; Bourguiba (1927–2009)	Neïla; Zouiten (b. 1935)
Mehdi; Bourguiba (b. 1959)	Moez; Bourguiba (b. 1956)	Mariem; Bourguiba (b.a. 1959)

== Birth ==
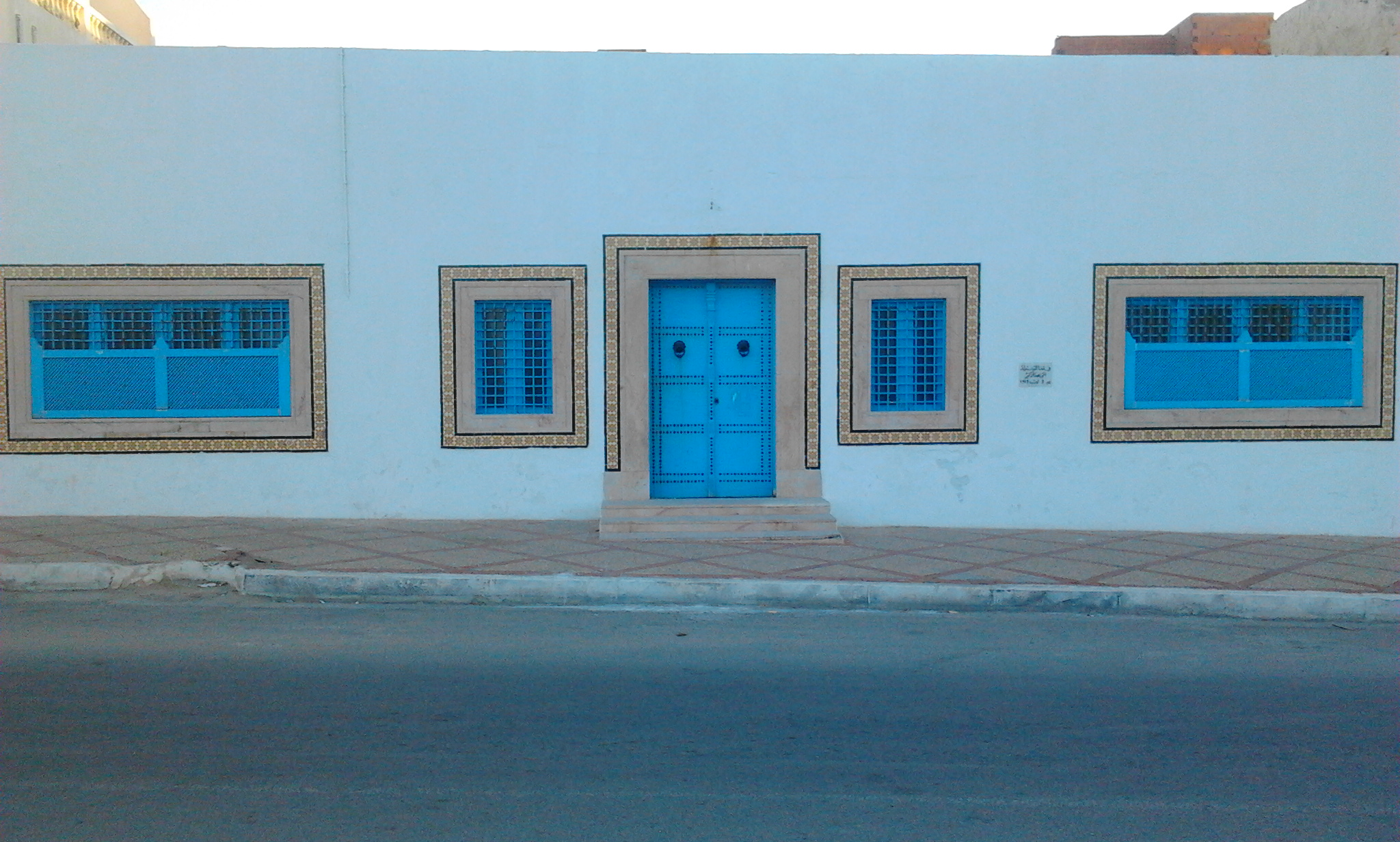
Birth home of Bourguiba

Bourguiba was officially born on August 3, 1903, in Monastir. However, there was a strong uncertainty related to his date of birth. According to his biographies, his date of birth may have been falsified in order to rejuvenate him, certain families avoiding to declare too early the birth of a boy in order to avoid circumcision, according to Samya El Mechat in her book La Tunisie et les chemins vers l'indépendance. 1945–1956 (Tunisia on the roads of independence. 1945–56). During a conference he gave on October 12, 1973, Bourguiba stated that they referred to his birth with that of his cousin, Chedli Zouiten, being nine months older than him. He concluded that his birthday might be on August 3, 1902. Nevertheless, the doubt remained since he might actually be born in 1901 or even 1898. In 1955, Bourguiba declared: "I was born in 1901. But when I enrolled in law school in Paris, circa 1924, the secretary made a mistake and wrote 1903. As I were not a young student, I was satisfied with this date of birth and kept it". One of his ministers, Mahmoud El Materi, confirmed this hypothesis in his memoirs.

Being the son of Ali Bourguiba and Fattouma Khefacha, who was 40 when he was born, Bourguiba stated that his mother was ashamed to conceive a child at that late age, her last pregnancy being seven years old at the time. Meanwhile, his father wondered whether he could raise his son at this old age. Habib Bourguiba later described his birth in these words: "When she conceived me, it was for her, the unfortunate, a catastrophe. She was already forty years old. Many of her pregnancies weakened her. I was told that when she gave birth to me, she was so ashamed of having a child at that age that she stifled her cries for deliverance while gritting her teeth with a towel placed in her mouth. Nevertheless, she was relieved to give birth to a boy, avoiding the catastrophe that would have been that of a girl. That was how Habib Bourguiba, last of his siblings was born.

== 1903–13: Childhood years ==
=== Early life in Monastir (1903–07) ===
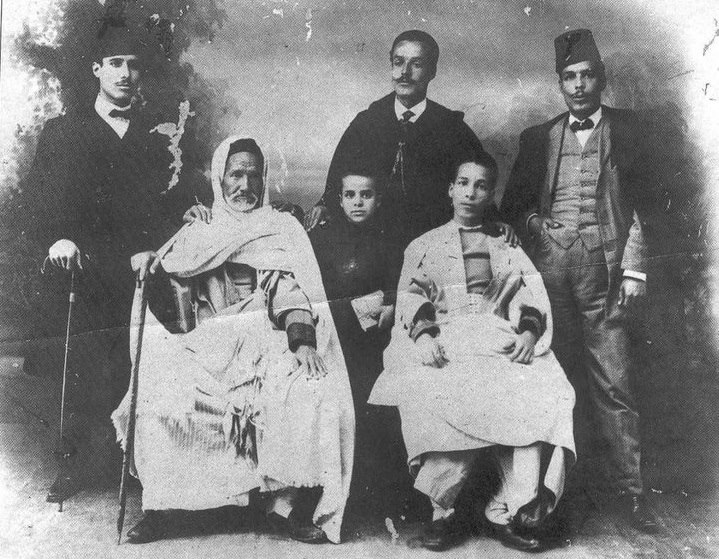
Ali Bourguiba surrounded by his sons Mohamed, Ahmed, Mhamed, Mahmoud and the youngest: Habib.

Despite his financial difficulties, Ali Bourguiba dedicated a great deal of attention to his children's education. This was criticized by his brother Mohamed who reproached him for giving too much consideration to their instruction. But he succeeded in providing good education for his children with his military pension, which led to their ascent in important jobs. His first born child, Mohamed, worked in Tunis as a nurse in Sadiki Hospital. Ahmed and Mohamed worked in the state administration. When Bourguiba was born, his brother, Mahmoud, was pursuing his studies in Sadiki College. In that year, Ali became councilman of Monastir, a job that helped him provide a modern education to Bourguiba.

In 1901, Ali raised enough money to build his own house in the "Tripolitanian quarter", composed of two vestibules, three rooms and one patio. To achieve this, Khadouja Mzali, mother of Fattouma, sold her part of the Mzali's heritage to aid her daughter in ending the construction of the house. When Bourguiba was born, Ali, who was 53, became councilman and was part once again of the city's notability, which permitted him both to improve his social and financial situation but also provide a modern education future for his last son, just like his brothers.

Habib was raised in a female environment, his brothers being in Tunis and his father being old. Therefore, he spent his days with his mother, grandmother and sisters, Aïsha and Nejia, which permitted him to witness the household chores of women and the gender inequality with men. Bourguiba recounted his childhood in these words: "I was the youngest of all. As such, I was responsible for all chores. I was, in short, a domestic. I was responsible for keeping the jug and pour water on the hands of my elders, after meals. But I was the elder of nobody, and I had to manage all by own with the huge container in order to wash my hands". Another fact also marked the childhood of Habib Bourguiba: Being the youngest of the family, he had to address his elders, including his brothers with the word "Sidi" (ser). However, the designation of his sisters was a problem of protocol. Even though they were older, their female gender did not give them a right of presence on young Habib. His father Ali, soon found a solution to the problem arguing that they had to call themselves with their respective first name, "no other difference hallmark". The young Habib soon noticed the low status of women in the beginning of the century.

=== Elementary education in Tunis (1907–13) ===
At first, Bourguiba was enrolled in the French-Arab elementary school of Monastir. There, he got close to a French teacher, Pierre Mounier-Pillet, and had kept contact with him for years, as they met forty years later in Cairo. But Ali, who wanted his son to have an exemplary education and chances like his brothers, sent him to Tunis in order to live with his brother M'hamed. In 1907, Bourguiba left Monastir toward Tunis, on board of Sousse train, which got him to the capital city, marked with the separation with his mother at 5 years old. He could only see his mother during summer vacations, after nine months of isolation. Years later, Bourguiba recounted that experience saying: "It was in 1907, such a journey at that time was not that easy. It was a real expedition. We went to Sousse thanks to a diligence that belonged to a Maltese named Carlo. This vehicle was dilapidated and needed the four or five passengers to get off in order to push it whenever we ascended a hill or retain the slope so that the hitch is not crushed. Arrived in Sousse, I had to take the train from the Bone-Guelma Company. It took four or five hours to reach Tunis". At his arrival, the city was marked with the fight against the protectorate and the emergence of the Tunisian national movement, led by Ali Bach Hamba.

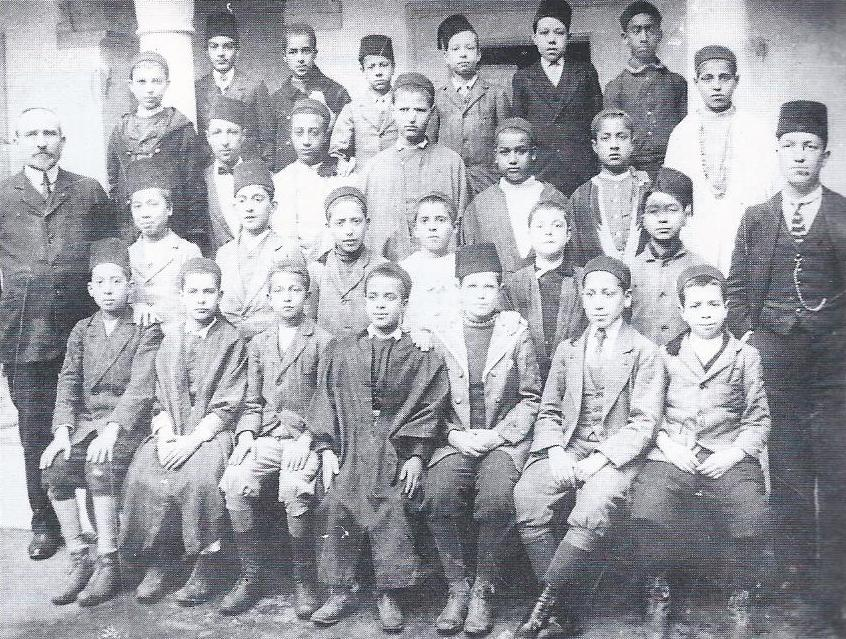
1910 Class photo of young Bourguiba in Sadiki.

Meanwhile, Bourguiba settled in the bourgeois neighborhood of Tourbet el Bey, in the medina of Tunis, where his brother M'hamed rented a housing on Korchani Street. Interpreter at the State section, he was often off to work or studying in the Khaldounia, aiming to prepare the first half of the French baccalaureate. This left Habib with Dhaouia, M'hamed's servant who made Habib her domestic; She made him do household chores or buy groceries and took him with her whenever she went visiting families in order to select a suitable wife for M'hamed. At the start of the 1907 school year, his brother enrolled him in the Sadiki elementary school. The superintendent described him as turbulent but studious. The young Habib had to perfect Quran learnings, that being the main lessons taught. That made him spend weekends studying and learning Quran with his brother Mahmoud, shouting and screaming being Mahmoud's teaching method. "To go to school", he recalled, "I had to go by foot. Leaving the house where I lived and which belonged to the grandfather of Tahar Lakhdar, I crossed the souks and climbed the hill of Sidi Ben Arous. I was poorly dressed. My shoes had holes which filled with water. By pride, I refused to ask my older brother to buy me a new pair. That was my life throughout my primary education". The Husainid family members being the only ones allowed to take lunch inside the school, Bourguiba had to go home and eat Dhaouia's ratatouilles that did not put an end to his hunger. It was only during the 1911 epidemic of Cholera which killed M'hamed's wife, that he was able to eat his fill, thanks to the Couscous destined for guests, narrowly avoiding starvation.

Nevertheless, young Habib spent his summer vacations in Monastir, among women who he helped with chores: help the servant called Fatma, bring the Baklava tray to the oven of uncle Hamida, monitor cooking then basting a ladle of honey or participating in the olive grove process. He also spent a lot of time with his father who insisted that he pursued with a studious education so he could avoid Ali's fate in the army: "I do not want you to be cut back like a workhorse. I do not want you to be like me, sentenced to wear a kit on your shoulders, all day long", did he say to his son. At the end of the holidays, he returned to his brother's in Tunis where, after lessons, he strolled streets and admired the bey coming, on each Thursday to the Kasbah, to chair the seal ceremony. He was also marked with the 1911 Jellaz Affair which ended with the execution of Manoubi Djardjar in Bab Saadoun, where he noticed the hostility and mocking laughter of preponderants. The exiles and repression following the Tramway boycott aiming to protest against the Jellaz issue, soon created an atmosphere of revolt and contestation.

The year 1913 was for Bourguiba an important one: Working harder on his studies, he obtained his Certificat d'études primaires which dispensed him of military servitude by order of a beylical decree and to the grand relief of his father. Not only did his son avoid his fate just like his other sons, but he was also permitted to pursue his education in the Sadiki College, receiving financial coverage for his studies, which included "shelter, food, clothing, school supplies and even free hammam every 15 days for six years" until he graduated. However, his joy did not last: On October 1, he went back to Tunis in order to start the year in Sadiki College but during the first week of November 1913, "the superintendent called me out of class and announced me the death of my mother", Bourguiba stated in 1973. "I immediately returned to Monastir where I found my whole family surrounding my mother lying on the deathbed [...] The death of my mother had deeply shaken me. I was indelibly marked". As for him, no other event has been rougher that his mother's death: Neither his future remoteness in Bordj le Bœuf years later, nor his imprisonment in the Fort Saint-Nicolas in Marseille nor even his exile in Cairo. He stated that he had at least made her proud by obtaining his certificat d'étude primaire.

== 1913–24: Secondary studies ==
=== Sadiki years (1913–20) ===
After his mother's funerals, young Habib left his brother's house in Tunis to settle in the Sadiki dormitories. Prestigious teachers from Ez-Zitouna mosque like Mohamed Abdelaziz Djaït taught him. "He taught us all the "moulakat" that I still know by heart and that I recite without needing to remind myself of them", he stated in 1973. He also learned Arabic grammar thanks to the cheikh Mohamed Belkadhi. Nevertheless, also French teachers marked him such as Mr. Collières who taught him French. "I can assure you that neither in Lycée Carnot nor, years later in university, did I have to acquire new skills to perfect this language [...] He had taught us the art of french writing. His teaching methods were remarkable. And if I learned to write articles in the admired perfect articulation and harmonious balance, it is to him that I owe that".

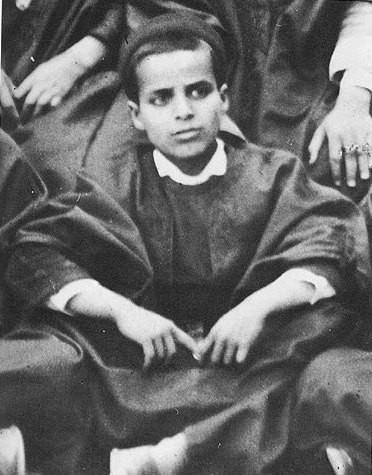
Bourguiba in 1917

However, his start of secondary studies coincided with the beginning of World War I in September 1914 shortly followed with the school's financial problems, managed by a severe headmaster. Bourguiba stated that back in that time, food was terrible: They served them a stew with squash and a macaroni at lunch while giving them a donut wrapped in newspaper and smelling oil, at breakfast. These terrible conditions led the students to protest, despite the headmaster's efforts to end the revolt. When he questioned Bourguiba, the young Habib denounced these horrible conditions, declaring that he did not deserve to be treated in this manner. Thinking that he was about to be punished, nothing happened and the young boy learned to dare, speak and denounce. He was also marked by the education he had and which started in him the germs of revolt. In his before final year, Bourguiba admired a talented student named Habib Jaouahdou. Jaouahdo explained to the pupils what was happening outside the walls of Sadiki and telling them all about the nationalist movement. His Arabic skills are reinforced by a marking professor: Mohamed Lasrem, who was as old as Bach Hamba and that Bourguiba remembered by saying: "I have to recognize that it is thanks to him that we have learned, since then, to express ourselves and write in classical arabic. This language was, at first, taught, mainly in the form of various versions. We had to translate administrative letters".

Slowly, he developed a patriotic feeling and went with his father, in April 1917, to the funerals of nationalist leader Béchir Sfar in Jellaz cemetery. The emotion of the people there, such as his father, had a strong impact on his youth. During his conference of 1973, he described that day saying:

We needed to take a walk in the surroundings of the Jellaz cemetery. He [his father] held my hand and I noticed that he was sobbing out to such a point that the people taught he was a relative of the dead. I understood, on that very day, that my father had strong patriotic feelings. But he never confessed to me about that. No doubt, he did not want to trouble the peace of my young age [...] The tears of my father, the day of Sfar's funerals had marked my youth. I do not remember asking him about the reasons he was crying. But that event had deeply influenced and sparked an intense patriotism in me.

Many important events succeeded such as the arrival of Abdelaziz Thâalbi from exile. Therefore, Jaouahdou decided to gather people and form a group that would welcome the nationalist leader. Bourguiba participated and went, with his fellows to Thâalbi's house in Pacha Street. Likewise, Bourguiba had to keep up with his school work to keep his ranks and be selected. On 32 students who started their first year with him, only 14 passed the exam for their final year. Bourguiba, internal and scholarship owner, must be careful with the final year results even though he was far from being one of the studious. His wretched life conditions worsened with his brother's marriage to Memia Saheb Ettabaâ, daughter of a former minister. She wanted revenge on him for this misalliance with a poor family and made of his life a real hell. Even Bourguiba's entourage, full of wealthy beldis, were aware of social inequalities. In 1917, he failed his Arabic brevet which permitted him to access an administrative office. Despite his strictness and rigidity, the headmaster permitted him to remake the sixth and last year of high school in the 1919–1920 school year. But the cold of winter and junk food caused by deprivation on the initiative of the school headmaster who supported a War effort, worsened the boy's health. In addition, Bourguiba was hospitalized because of a primary infection, which led him to abandon high school and remain at the hospital. During the 1973 conference he held, he described that illness he had saying: "The sixth year was the final one, the diploma year of deliverance. Unfortunately, or fortunately for Tunisia, I fall ill in the last two months".

=== Journey in Kef (1920–22) ===
To heal and get better, Bourguiba's family sent young Habib to his brother Mohamed in Kef and therefore, enjoy natural landscapes and good mountain air. His brother, a 39 years old medic at the local hospital, was very appreciated by the inhabitants of the city. From January 1920, he welcomed his brother warmly for twenty one months. This long two years journey was a turning point in his life. Indeed, far away from the horrible school conditions and the abuse of both Dahouia and his sister-in-law, the skinny pale teenager could finally evolve into a confident man. His brother Mohamed played a major part in this change of personality, being open-minded, modernist and advocating for secularism. Mohamed lived with an Italian nurse who was not that snub bourgeoisie. On the contrary, she warmly welcomed him and had a great part in his metamorphosis, filling the emotional void of the young boy. Likewise, Mohamed was a great lover of theater and former director of the drama troupe Ech-Chahama, who had stopped its activities because of the war. Between 1909 and 1913, it performed famous plays such as Hamlet, Mejnoun Leila... Since it reprised its activities, Bourguiba rehearsed with his brother and participated in plays that gave him insurance. Unfortunately, the rehearsed play was prohibited by authorities because it recalled the situation of Netherlands people under Spanish colonization. However, Bourguiba enjoyed his brother's sympathy toward the Kef inhabitants: He learned to play cards, discussed military strategy, got interested in Mustafa Kemal Atatürk then visited his other brother Ahmed in Thala with whom he learned horseriding.

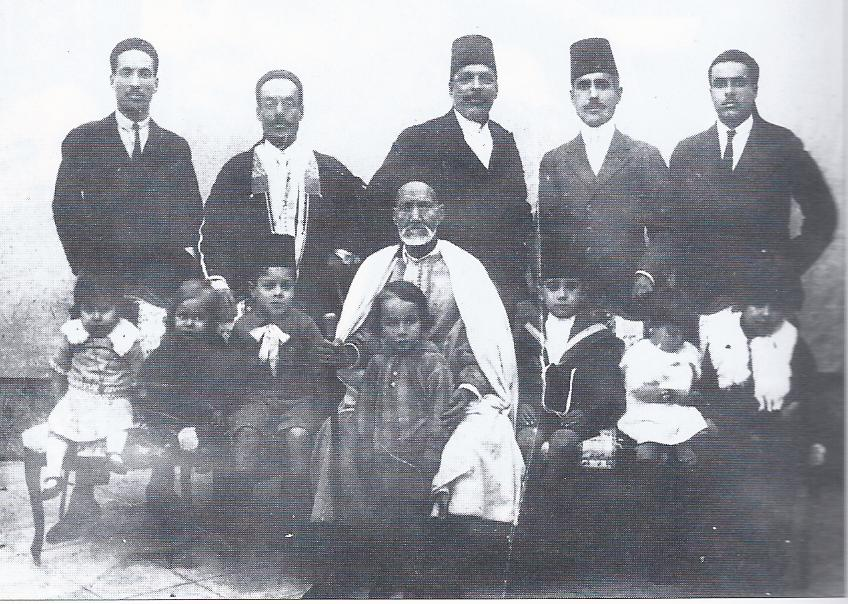
Bourguiba family in the beginnings of the 1920s.

Bourguiba was satisfied with his journey to Kef: "My journey in Kef cured my health. But it was too late for my physical development. My height did not grow from 1 m 65, which meant 5 centimeters less from normal. Because in my teenage years, I lacked vitamins now available to young people and granted to them free of charge in hospitals and by national organizations", he stated years later. While he was in Kef, the Destour party was founded aiming independence. Since then, Bourguiba showed interest in activism and declared to one of his friends in Kef, Othman Kaak: "You love literature. I, myself, like it, I even love it. But I have other goals. I want to enroll in law school to fight against France". His goals were, however, thwarted by his non-studious educations, unlike his old mates of Sadiki, who became bureaucrats in the colonial administration.

Therefore, a family meeting took place to talk about the boy's future: None of his sisters-in-law was ready to finance his studies. As for his brothers, they considered him unsuccessful and considered to find him a job as a farmer or grocer's apprentice. Only his brother Mahmoud, who was a thirty years old single and worker at the ministry of Justice, decided to invest in his brother's education. Thanks to his support and aid, Bourguiba enrolled in Lycée Carnot of Tunis. Bourguiba stated in 1973 the reasons his brother supported him: "As for "si" Mahmoud, I had forgotten to tell you that the year I passed my certificat d'études primaires and lost my mother, he had just left Sadiki where he was an intern. He was in classe de seconde. I lived, myself in Tourbet El Bey. Every Friday and Sunday of every week, he came home to teach me. But he used, during his task, an unpreceeded brutality and savagery. He was in such a furry that he beat me like plaster. I was still not ten and my fear was so intense that I could not even focus or understand tasks that he asked me. Each time, panicked, the cleaning woman rushed to the window and cried for help. I was severely traumatized and I still wonder today how such a scandalous treatment has not finally overcame my intelligence and thirst for knowledge [...] He had indeed redeemed himself".

=== Lycée Carnot years (1922–24) ===
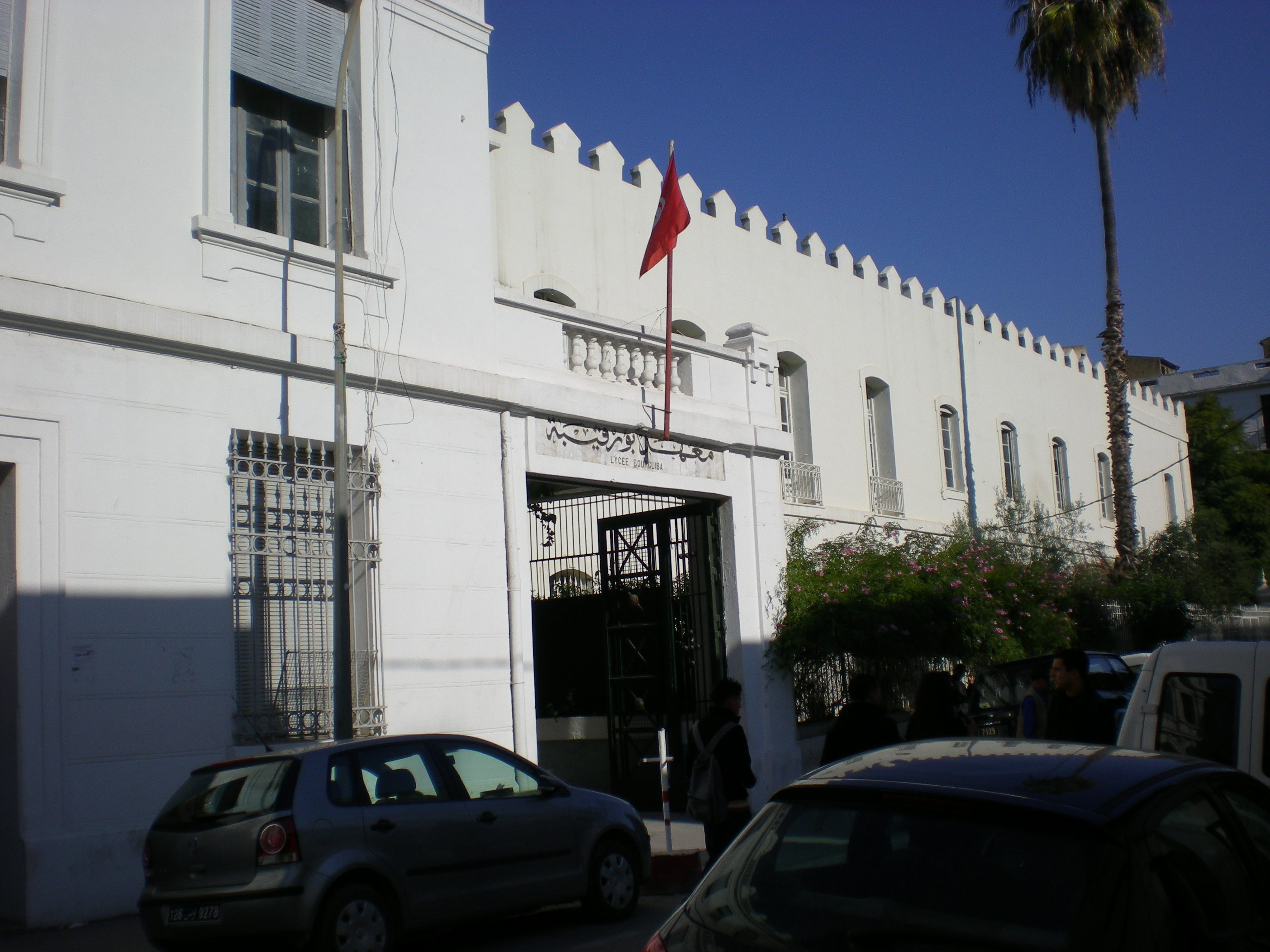
Lycée Carnot of Tunis, nowadays the Bourguiba pioneer school.

Bourguiba was first admitted in classe de première thanks to the help of his brother Mahmoud who solicited the headmaster's secretary, Tahar Zouiten. There, Bourguiba found, with great pleasure, his old Sadiki friend, Tahar Sfar, who studied in another classe de première. Two or three weeks later, he was summoned by Tahar Zouiten who announced the decision to downgrade him to classe de seconde. Bourguiba stated years later: "Despite the chagrin caused by this downgrade, I executed the decision. But three months later, I visited Mr. Zouiten to tell him how much I was thankful to his initiative which helped me learn new disciplines I did not master in Sadiki College. I had just discovered Mathematics. I did not learn algebra or geometry in Sadiki where we were spending our mathematics classes laughing and having fun".

Indeed, Bourguiba developed a great consideration for mathematics because of the attention that dedicated his new teacher, Mr. Perrachon to his students. However, he was never present during French lessons, taught by an old regularly heckled professor: "Our timetable scheduled, for Friday afternoon, a history-geography lesson, from 2pm to 3pm and a french lesson from 3pm to 4pm. I was present during the first lesson then left high school at 3pm in order to go to the theatre where an Arab play was held, in Friday afternoon [...] I was very keen on drama. I thought, moreover, that in matters of French, I really did not need to provide additional efforts, being taught by Mr. Collières at Sadiki". Indeed, he was ranked first in quarterly exams of French, despite these repeated absences. The reason was mere according to Bourguiba who explained it: "Every Friday afternoon, a supervisor came to our history class at 2p.m. He checked the presents and wrote the names of those who were absent. Thus supervisor, who by the way was Tunisian, came back the next hour in french classes. The professor, whose dignity forbade him to suffer a native heckling, hastened to mention the same names written on the notebook and sign. Thus, I had never attended French classes and my absences were regularly unnoticed". Nevertheless, during quarterly exams, Bourguiba was ranked first of second in French.

In lycée Carnot, Bourguiba strengthened his friendship with Tahar Sfar and became friends with Bahri Guiga. Both of them originated in Testour but despite that, the three of them were called the "Sahelian Threesome". In Tunis, the maneuvers of Lucien Sait, resident-general, to discard the relations between the bey and the Destour were a total failure. Indeed, he decided to fake an interview destined to French audiences in which Nacer Bey announced being opposed to the movement and that he did not agree with the adoption of a constitution. However, this statement was made public and the bey denied many parts of the interview, denouncing French maneuvers and threatening to abdicate. Therefore, public opinion decided to mobilize in support of this nationalist bey. Likewise, Tunis inhabitants went by foot to the Marsa Palace to express their support, on April 5, 1922. Bourguiba was one of the protesters. In response to the protests, Lucien Saint went to the beylical palace, accompanied by militaries and obliged the ruler not to abdicate. Meanwhile, the newspaper Essawab was suspended and charged for disseminating false information. Bourguiba and Jouahdou, his former mate of sadiki, protested with Tunis inhabitants against these statements and miraculously avoid being expelled from school. During the conference he held years later, in 1973, Bourguiba recalled the points that marked his youth and influenced his thinking:

In truth, when I was a student in Sadiki, I used to be certainly, animated by patriotic feelings but I never took action. However, during my student life, I participated in political acts twice: The first time occurred upon the return from Orient of Cheikh Thaâlbi. It was an event which, at the time, sensitize public opinion. Especially since the character became popular after his former involvement with the court of Sharaa [...] The second political event that marked my life and during which I actively participated, was the protests of April 5, 1922. These protests strongly shook the entire people, especially youthfulness. At that time, I used to be student in Lycée Carnot [...] People were always ready to support whoever opposed France. Therefore, we organized a march towards the beylical palace. Suffering from a foot abscess, I remember tying my shoe to my shoeless foot, joining the protesters and browsing the distance between Tunis and Marsa where the bey lived.

Bourguiba spent his vacations in Mahdia, in his sister Nejia's house. There, he met numerous friends and discussed political and philosophical ideas, being Arab like those of Al-Mutanabbi or French like those of Victor Hugo. At night, they gathered to debate and called their group, the "Circle of Mahdia". In 1923–1924, Bourguiba and his three friends were inseparable, Sfar becoming his confident.

In his new school, Bourguiba noticed the inequalities between French and Tunisians, not tolerated in certain public spaces and enjoying less rights than the native population. Bourguiba had excellent results during the first part of baccalaureate and ended up choosing Philosophy section, to the grand surprise of his classmates, Bourguiba being the first in mathematics class. Bourguiba stated that he wanted to "prepare himself properly for the big battle". Likewise, he justified his decision saying: "It was for me to approach a new nuanced discipline which was not like mathematics where two plus two always equals four. Philosophy addresses indeed complex issues that opened new horizons in my mind, eager for knowledge. Thus, I would be better equipped to triumph the cause to which I decided to devote my life. So I opted for the philosophy section". So he started his new lessons in Professor Picard's class who introduced different philosophical doctrines, "letting his students free to choose the opinion that was the closest to their personal ideas". He regularly visited libraries, had a great passion for history books but consistently skipped classes in order to attend, every Friday, Habiba Msika's performance of L'Aiglon. In 1923, in the start of his final year, Chedlia Zouiten, daughter of his cousin Aïchoucha Bourguiba, was promised to him by his father as his future wife.

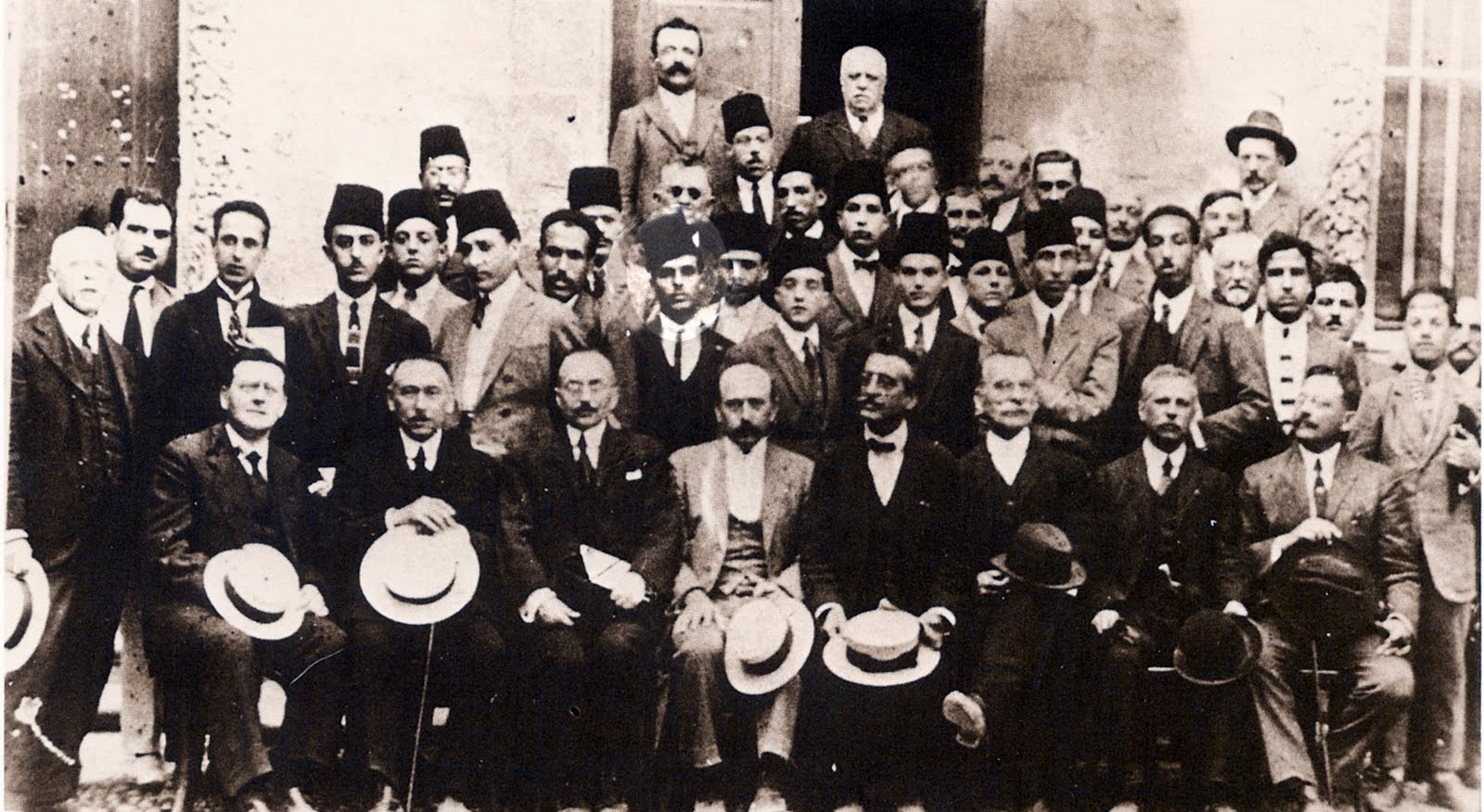
Habib Bourguiba with his classmates in a school picture in 1924 as an undergraduate.

Their final year soon coming to an end, the future graduates were aware of the important part there should have in the future of their country. Bourguiba was interested in French politics and support socialism. Obtaining outstanding marks, he had, nevertheless, a tight competition with Augustin Barbe, a French classmate, in order to earn a scholarship for high studies in Paris. Furthermore, he was supported by his brother Mahmoud, who promised to send him 50 francs per month, even though he wanted his brother to pursue his studies in Alger with M'hamed, who had just obtained his baccalaureate. Despite his attempts to dissuade him, Bourguiba stood firm. "It was in Paris that I wanted to pursue my studies in order to deeply learn its way of living and ruling but also the secrets of its administrative, political and parliamentary organization", he justified years later.

In 1924, he sat for his baccalaureate which consisted in three examinations: a two coefficient philosophical one, a natural scientific one and a physical-chemical one, each of them of one coefficient and a half. He obtained sixteen to twenty in philosophy thanks to a "formidable dissertation", which ranked him first of his class with honors. He recounted that day in those words: "At the announcement of the results I felt worried. I wanted first rank, at any coast. Being second did not satisfy me. To my grand relief I happened to be first with honors. The second was Auguste Barbe". He stated at the announcement of the results: "I will be a lawyer and I shall put an end to the protectorate. Therefore, Bourguiba left the country to pursue his studies in Paris. He then embarked on an old tub, The Oujda , to discover France.

== 1924–27: Higher education in Paris ==
=== Discovering the colonial empire (1924–1925) ===
Following his arrival in Paris, Bourguiba settled in Vauqueur pension who reserved him a sordid welcoming. The pension was nearby Hôtel Saint-Séverin, next to Place Saint-Michel, where he used to lodge in a room on the sixth floor for 150 francs per month, with an extra for a heater that did not work. He spent his first months wandering in hotels in Quartier latin and Tunisian student's dormitories. Preferring to attend philosophical classes, Bourguiba sent his notes to his brother M'hamed and excelled in his studies. Interested in Arab culture, he attend William Marçais's lessons beside his psychological and psychotherapy interest in George Dumas's conference, in hôpital Saint-Anne. Furthermore, he met, in the hospital, paranoias who thought they were Napoleon or other historical personalities. "I felt then that euphoria of knowledge that increases as our research extends", he recalled in 1973. "However, I ended realising that I did not come to France for that purpose, but rather to arm myself intellectually to combat the French colonization. Therefore, I was determined to put an end to these parallel endless studies that diverted me from my goals".

He regularly wrote to his family asking them to send some money because he went through hard times but, thanks to the intervention of Hassan Chedli, a Monastirian accountant in Sadiki College, he received a scholarship of 1800 francs, payable in two installments, then enrolled at the Paris law school and started his new classes of psychology and literature in Sorbonne

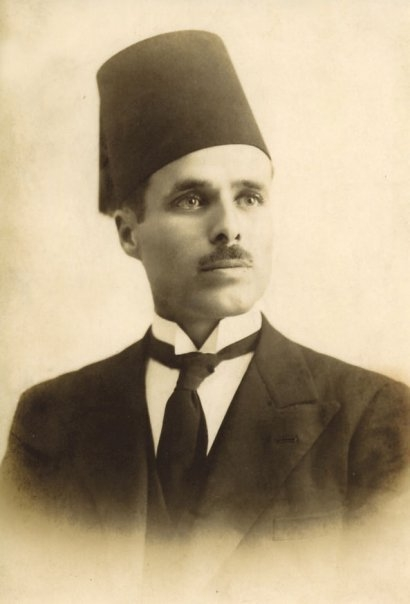
Portrait of Bourguiba, during his first year in France.

The 1924–25 school year was a hard period of work for Bourguiba. However, he used to be interested in politics and French culture that he was eager to discover in every aspect. He frequently went to Palais Bourbon where he attended debates and sensitized to the intellectual and sentimental spirit of Leon Blum, that he already knew from Le Populaire. He also closely followed the evolution of French politics during the Third Republic. It was while discovering this new knowledge that he developed an interest for politics. Between classes, students went to Jardin du Luxembourg to talk about news and political issues, during the France between two wars. Bourguiba went to read his newspaper and participate in the debates. In that context of post-war, the main topics were Woodrow Wilson's self-determination doctrine and the Russian Revolution of 1917, but also the Congress of Tours that divided the SFIO. Furthermore, 1924 discussions were about Vladimir Lenin's death but also socialism and the rivalry between Joseph Stalin and Leon Trotsky. Bourguiba was following the international news in detail, was opposed to Bolsheviks and got interested in Gandhi's idea of transforming the National Indian Congress into a powerful mass organization. He also thought that Hô Chi Minh's participation in Tours Congress and his joining of the Communist International, aiming to get his country independence with the help of the enemies of Imperialism and Capitalism, made him dependent of the Union of Socialist Soviet Republics (USSR). Bourguiba also admired his Tunisian fellow Mahmoud El Materi, who was active in Paris.

He also liked the statue of Auguste Comte, father of Positivism, below which was written: "Live for others". Bourguiba stated years later that "It was the expression of the very purpose of life I wanted to live, the goal I set myself". During his fourth conference, he exposed his determinations when he was student in Paris:

It's life. It is made of research and action. I was eager to discover the workings of this civilization, the secret of the power of this country, which reduced mine to the colonial condition so that, well knowing my goals, I was able, the day I start the fight, to adopt the appropriate tactics to dissuade him and bring him to change policy.

In summer, Bourguiba returned to Monastir where he also found M'hamed, who came back from Algeria obtaining his law degree. After vacations spent between Mahdia and Monastir, Bourguiba returned to Paris in the opening of 1925–26 school year, worried about nationalist activism back in the country. Firstly, he moved to the university campus of Boulevard Jourdan where he lodged in a room number 114. "We lodged there freely. We benefited from a restaurant. The food was hearty and healthy [...] It was a nice, clean place", he described it in 1973. The sponsor Taieb Radhwan, sent him via the association Les Amis de l'étudiant, registration fees to Paris Institute of Political Studies, where he started attending public finance classes. He obtained a financial aid from his friend and protector, Mounier-Pillet, his former teacher in Monastir. The same year, his friends Sfar and Guiga joined him to Paris while he was tutoring a Sfaxian student, Mohamed Aloulou, sent by his parents to sit for the baccalaureate exam in Lycée Louis-le-Grand.

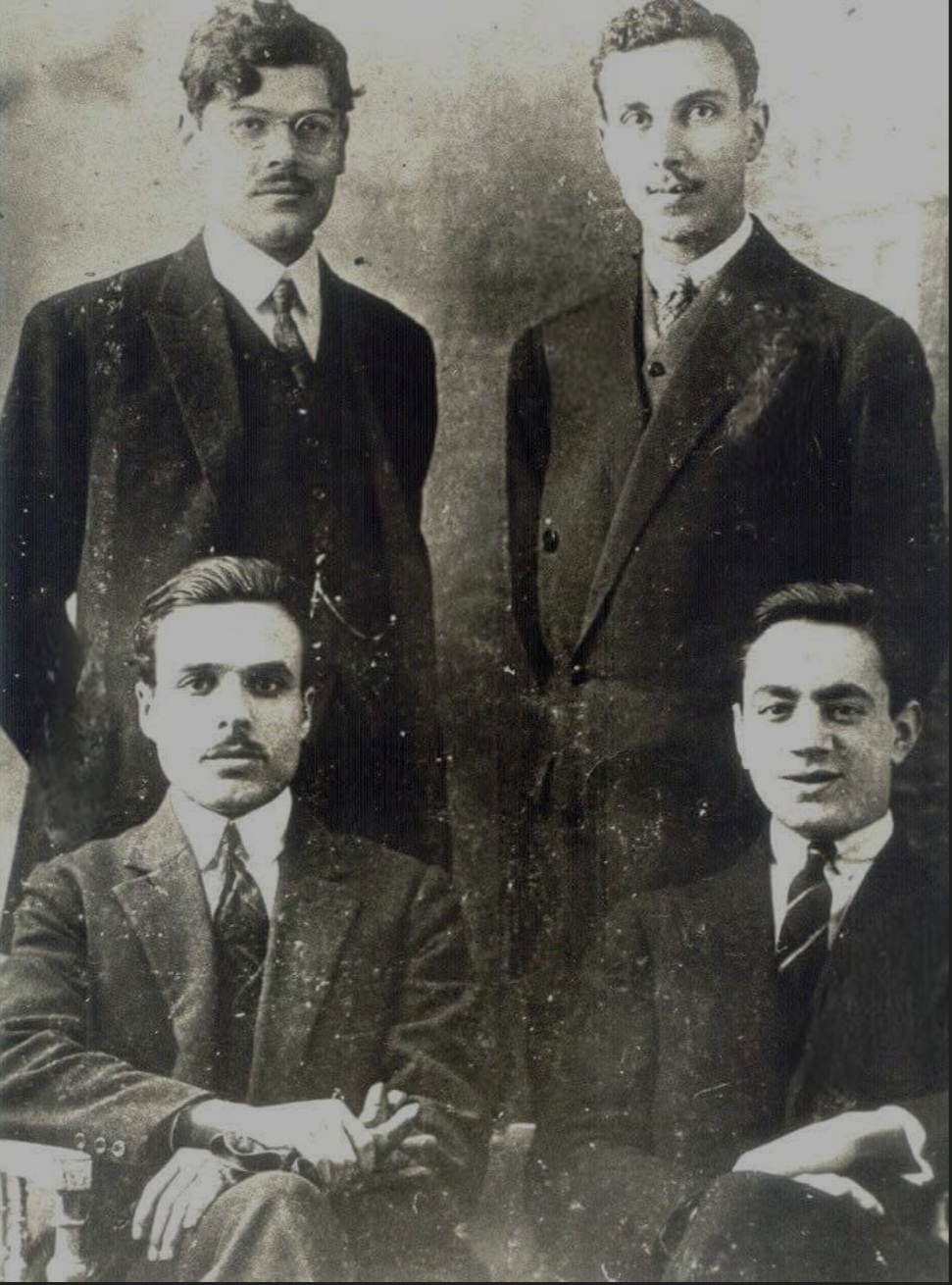
Standing from left to right : Tahar Sfar and Bahri Guiga. Sitting : H. Bourguiba and Mohamed Aloulou.

=== Law studies and meeting Mathilde Lefras (1925–1927) ===
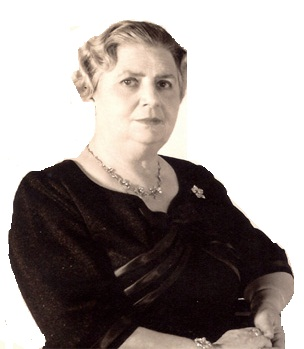
Portrait of Mathilde Lefras

One day of 1925, while tiding his room, Bourguiba found the address of a woman his protector recommended to meet: Mathilde Lefras, a 35 years old widow whose husband died during the war. He met her for the first time in her apartment, on the first floor of a building in the 20th arrondissement of Paris. She invited him to enter and asked him to tell his story. Touched by it, she asked to see him once again, and, in the upcoming months, invited him to move in with her. Since then, he gave his room in the campus away and settled with Mathilde.

With this new way of life, Bourguiba distanced from the other students, even with the Zouitens, supposed to be his future family-in-law and sightseeing in Paris. It was Habib, the brother of Chadlia Zouiten, who discovered his affair with Mathilde and wrote him a letter: "I do not hide that I find this attitude a bit coward [...] you, who was supposed to marry my sister". But even in the neighbourhood, their relationship was very frowned and, to end gossips, Bourguiba elaborated a stratagem: He wore his costume and arrived in Mathilde's car, accompanied by Sfar and Guiga to simulate their wedding. All these changes seemed to have distanced him from his way of activism in Tunisia, despite the riots and uprising that started in the country, the resident-general ending up signing a decree to prohibit freedom of expression, but also censoring newspapers.

During the summer of 1925, he went back to Monastir but was not interested in his country's political adventures. His father died in September and, a few days later, he received a telegram from Mathilde, announcing that she was pregnant. This situation of responsibility worried Bourguiba who decided, on his return to Paris, to inform one of his friends about the news. This friend proposed that he break up with Mathilde and leave the responsibility of educating the child to her, which Bourguiba refused, stating he was as responsible for that as she was, having the sense of family responsibilities.

Furthermore, this pregnancy reassured him because he thought he was sterile, as he possessed only one testicle. But the couple's relationship worsened gradually so that Bourguiba decided to sleep in his friends' rooms at the campus. On April 9, 1927, Mathilde gave birth to a boy they named Jean Habib Bourguiba. After that, the couple moved out to settle in Bagneux, a French suburb, in a room used both as bedroom and dining room. Bourguiba, although sick, had to prepare for his final exams, which he sat a month after the birth of his son. He finally obtained a bachelor's degree in law and the higher degree of political studies from the Paris Institute of Political Studies.

== 1927–1930 : Early adult life in Tunis ==
=== Difficult professional career debuts ===
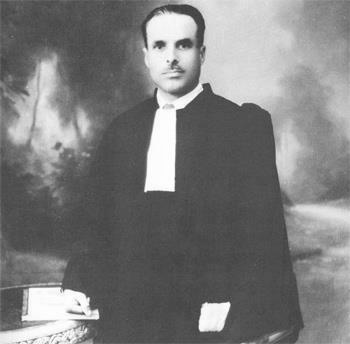
Bourguiba in lawyer robes, after his return to Tunis.

In August 1927, a 26 years old Bourguiba returned to Tunisia, not only with a girlfriend and his son Habib Jr. but also a deep knowledge of French politics during the Third Republic. While in France, he had been influenced by liberal values of the social-radical secular country, shared earlier by his brother Mohamed. Following his come back in Tunisia, he married Mathilde, while Mahmoud Laribi was his best man and settled in the Capital City. At the time, he was not interested in politics but in his professional career, every debuting lawyer having to do a three-year traineeship under the supervision of another experienced lawyer. For a whole year, from October 1927 to October 1928, Bourguiba concatenated traineeship: First he was hired by a certain Mr. Cirier, who dismissed him after six weeks. Bourguiba testified in these words: "It was hard to understand. I had not yet started my political action. He may sensed risks. He offered to compensate me. But I preferred to leave without further ado. I had to look for another patronage. We were late November. Everything was settled; trainees were all installed. Nothing was offered to me".

Bourguiba then contacted Hamouda Boussen, whom he met and who used to be known for his many contacts. Thanks to his help, Bourguiba found a traineeship, working for Mr. Pietra and Mr. Scemama, who paid him only after two months. Their law firm was located in rue de l'ancienne poste, between the Street of Maltese and Avenue of France. He then lived in Street of Résevoir where he rented an apartment with 300 francs per month. As for Bourguiba, "Nothing mattered. What was necessary over all was to be domiciled in a law office holder for the duration of the regulatory internship. However, Bourguiba quickly acquired an annoying renowned for his bosses: "It was impossible to continue working with this Bourguiba! This was a man the law firm hired for an internship and there he is, stealing customers!". They soon informed him that he had no longer the responsibility of pleadings, henceforth the charge of Mr. Zérah. Bourguiba, instead was charged in writing works. By the end of June 1928, he resigned from the lawyer office.

After his resignation, he found a job at Salah Farhat's lawyer office. Bourguiba, who only wanted a place where he could work did not ask Farhat, who was at the time deputy chairman of the Destour, for money but for a working place. Nevertheless, he worked all summer at Farhat's and had a salary of 300 francs per month. He soon met a worker at the office of a certain Mr. Sebault. This one engaged Bourguiba for 600 francs per month which led Bourguiba to work another year more than the three mandatory ones.

His family and entourage did not really approve his marriage to a French older woman, when he was promised to his cousin Zouiten. His brother Mahmoud, even though opposed to this union, helped him by inviting his family live with him in his house in Le Kram. Bourguiba settled with his wife and son into his brother's home while this one abandoned his wedding plans. That very year, their sister Nejia Bouzgarou lost her husband who died and joined her brothers temporarily with her four children. Even though he liked being surrounded by his family, Mathilde was not pleased with their situation and urged her husband to move out. So they did, settling in Tunis downtown once again, where they lived till 1933. For that moment, Bourguiba was not interested in politics but rather work, lodging and family. One of his closest friends stated that his main ambition at the time was to "settle down" and that he acquired a certain maturity and autonomy since he was no more dependent on his brothers.

=== Political beginnings ===
In that context of colonial oppression, Bourguiba felt the effects of inequality, mainly after he spent a whole year of unemployment. This inequality chocked him and led him to discuss these matters with both Tunisian and French friends, who agree with the necessity to start a reform process aiming to get Tunisia resemble France, that is, liberal, modern and secular.

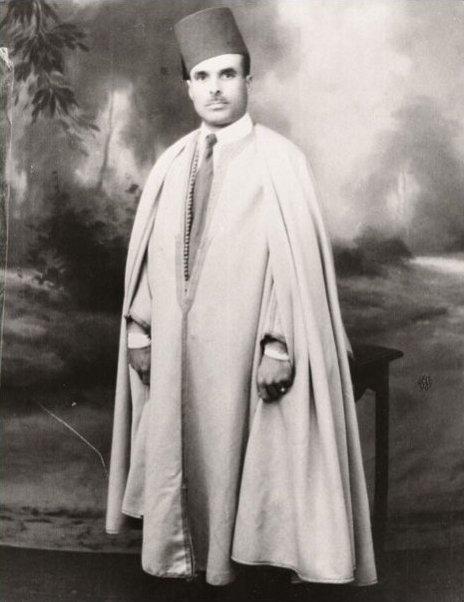
Picture of Bourguiba wearing his traditional dress, circa 1928, after his return to Tunisia.

On January 8, 1929, Bourguiba attended a conference held in the cultural association L'Essor by Habiba Menchari, a young woman who advocated for women's rights. Since he could not come, Bourguiba went instead of his brother M'hamed. Many Destour members, French and Tunisians attended the event. Menchari complained about Muslim women's conditions and then threw her veil down, starting debates. The Muslim attendees denounced this act, according to the law and Islamic learnings then started to debate the length of the jilbab. Therefore, Bourguiba stated:

Let us put aside the jilbab distingo. The veil is certainly not aesthetic, but it is part of the Tunisian personality. In the hard times we live in, in this regime that we suffer, they want our personality destroyed and our people francizied. We are not strong. We do not have any power and we need to hold on to all the attributes, even decadent, of this personality. It is the only way to preserve our proper entity. We will discuss the veil the day it will not threaten the integrity of our national personality, like it was with the adoption of the European costume. But today, as long as our country is threatened with melting, deletion and destruction, consent to the abandonment of an attribute of our personality would be suicide.

His speech surprised the liberal attendees like André Duran-Angliviel, his sister Eve Fichet, journalist using the nickname Eve Nohelle, the unionist Joachim Durel and the lawyer Mohamed Noomane. Durel criticized Bourguiba's thinking and wrote in Tunis socialiste that "Everything worked well and there he was talking about Tunisian personality. As if there even were a Tunisian personality! But we are dealing with a mix of Arabs, Muslims, Jews, Maltese, French...". Bourguiba, in response, was opposed to Durel's thinking as he demonstrated by his articles in L'Étendard tunisien. The controversy that followed opposed, for nearly a month, Bourguiba and Durel, who was astonished that Bourguiba ended up with a French woman. Bourguiba then wrote that he was there to raise their son as a proper Tunisian, according to their country's culture and education. In 1973, Bourguiba testified on this controversy that had been his political start:

The French Socialist Party, passed a motion declaring that by occupying Tunisia, France had not only rights but also obligations. It had a duty to raise the level of the Tunisian people, to create a nation by suppressing religious particularities. The word, however, did not apply to the current Tunisian people, amorphous amalgam of various communities, but of a people who had to be created in future generations. In that time the Socialist Party advocated the emancipation. There it was the emancipation they advocated! I denounced this hypocrisy. I denounced this colonial pseudo-ideology: in a hundred years, when all Tunisians will be French, we will see the Socialist Party resume its liberation crusade. The tussle between Durel and myself was violent.

Bourguiba had also reacted to the statement of Maurice Viollette, governor-general of Algeria, who proclaimed "North Africa is an integral part of France and that it was impossible for France to abandon a bit of it". 1930 was the peak of French colonization in North Africa, which led France to celebrate the centenary of the French conquest of Algeria, by organizing a eucharistic congress in Tunisia. On this occasion, millions of Europeans invaded the capital city and went to the Saint-Lucien de Carthage cathedral, disguised in crusaders, which humiliated and revolted the people who protested against what they considered, as a violation of an Islam land by Christendom. The protestors, strongly repressed, were brought to Justice and some of had Bourguiba for lawyer, as he did not participate in the event. He also remained neutral when Tahar Haddad was dismissed of his duties of notary. He estimated at that moment, that the main goals were political, while other problems of society are secondary, insisting on the Tunisian personality and identity that had to affirm, declaring: "Let us be what we are before becoming what we will".

== Bibliography ==
- Bessis, Sophie; Belhassen, Souhayr (2012). Bourguiba (in French). Tunis: Elyzad. ISBN 978-9973-58-044-3.
- Bourguiba, Habib Jr. (2013), Notre histoire. Entretiens avec Mohamed Kerrou (in French), Tunis: Cérès
- Martel, Pierre-Albin (1999). Habib Bourguiba. Un homme, un siècle (in French). Paris: Éditions du Jaguar. ISBN 978-2-86950-320-5.
- Said, Safi (2000), Bourguiba : une biographie quasi interdite (in Arabic), Beyrouth: Riad El Rayes Books
- Bourguiba, Habib (2016), Ma vie, mes idées, mon combat (in French), Tunis: Apollonia editions, ISBN 978-9973-827-90-6
