= Hélé Béji =

Tunisian writer (born 1948)

- هالة الباجي
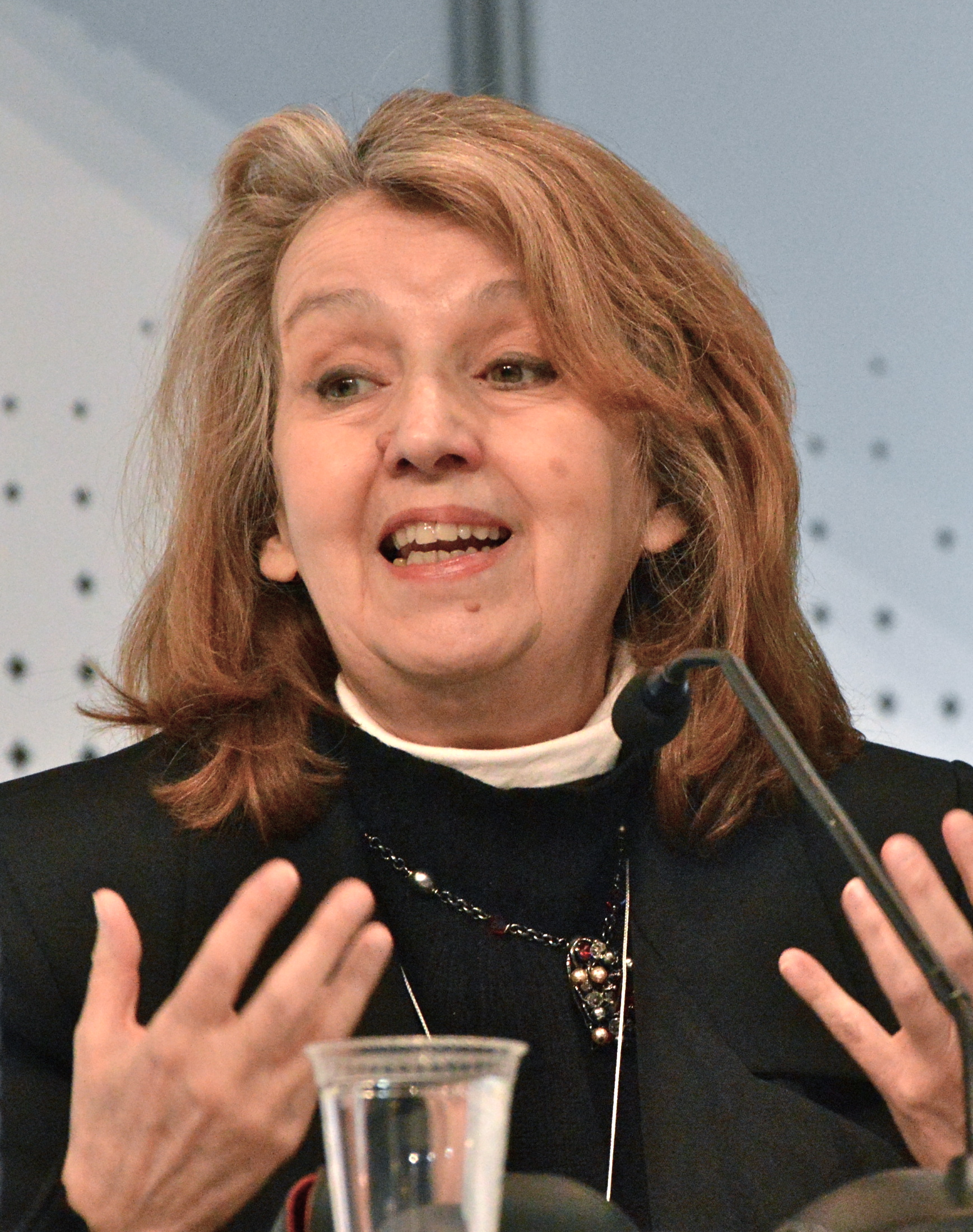
- Hélé Béji in 2017
- Born: 1 April 1948 (age 78); Tunis, Tunisia
- Relatives: Mondher Ben Ammar (father); Tarak Ben Ammar (brother); Yasmine Torjeman-Besson (niece); Sonia Ben Ammar (niece)
- Writing career
- Language: French

Hélé Béji (Arabic: هالة الباجي; born 1 April 1948) is a Tunisian writer.

== Biography ==
The daughter of Tunisian politician and diplomat Mondher Ben Ammar and Corsican mother Simone Gaggeri, she was born in Tunis, passed her Agrégation de lettres modernes and went on to teach literature at the University of Tunis. She later joined UNESCO in Paris. In 1998, she founded the Collège international de Tunis. She has expressed a great admiration for the author Marcel Proust and his influence can be seen in her fiction. In 1983, she received the Prix de l’Afrique méditerranéenne awarded by the Association des écrivains de langue française. She has contributed to the magazines Le Débat and Esprit.

She is the sister of movie producer Tarak Ben Ammar. Her niece Yasmine Torjeman-Besson married French politician Éric Besson. Her aunt Wassila Ben Ammar was the First Lady of Tunisia as the wife of the first President of Tunisia, Habib Bourguiba.

== Selected works ==
Sources:

- Le Désenchantement national, essai sur la décolonisation, political essay (1982)
- L’oeil du jour, novel (1985)
- Itinéraire de Paris à Tunis, satire (1992)
- L'Art contre la culture, essay (1992)
- L’Imposture culturelle, essay (1997)
- Islam Pride, essay (2011)
