= Tarak Ben Ammar =

Tunisian-French film producer

- طارق بن عمّار
- Born: 12 June 1949 (age 77); Tunis
- Education: Georgetown University
- Occupation: Film producer
- Children: 4, including Sonia Ben Ammar

Tarak Ben Ammar (Arabic: طارق بن عمّار; born June 12, 1949) is a Tunisian film producer and distributor. He is famous for his interest in artistic movies, especially when they are related to Mediterranean culture or require North African locations.

== Early years ==
Tarak Ben Ammar was born in 1949 in Tunis, to a political family in Tunisia who fought for and gained independence from France in 1956, and where his uncle Habib Bourguiba became the first President of Tunisia. After studies in Rome and graduating from Georgetown University in Washington, Tarak Ben Ammar started his career as film producer.

== Career ==
Tarak Ben Ammar forged a successful career as a film producer, working on George Lucas's Star Wars, Steven Spielberg's Raiders of the Lost Ark, Franco Zeffirelli's Jesus of Nazareth and La Traviata, Monty Python's Life of Brian, Roman Polanski's Pirates, and Mel Gibson's The Passion of the Christ. He created the film industry in Tunisia by building the first film studios which have attracted 58 films. He produced all his films through French companies Carthago Films, and Quinta Communications. In 1984, French President François Mitterrand awarded him the Légion d'Honneur in recognition of his contribution to cinema. Tarak Ben Ammar is also a businessman, he has served as an advisor to Rupert Murdoch, Prince Al Waleed, Leo Kirch, Vincent Bolloré and Silvio Berlusconi and has been board member of companies such as Mediaset, Mediobanca, Telecom Italia and Vivendi. He has also been Michael Jackson's manager from 1996 to 1998 and was the producer of his last worldwide tour, Michael Jackson’s HiStory Tour. In 2009, Tarak Ben Ammar officially launched Nessma, the first North African independent TV Channel which plays a key role in promoting freedom of speech and democracy in Tunisia. Nessma is also the leading channel in North Africa. He also controls Eagle Pictures, which is Italy’s number one independent film distribution and production company with a library of 3,500 films.

Tarak Ben Ammar also formed a US venture called Spyglass Media Group. Spyglass announced a strategic partnership with Warner Bros and other important US partners, such as Lionsgate Entertainment. In 2022, Tarak Ben Ammar acquired with Lantern Entertainment and his company Eagle Pictures, Studios de Paris, the largest movie studio in Paris. In 2023, his company Eagle Pictures has enlarged its strategic alliance with Sony Pictures by becoming the exclusive distributor of Sony Pictures in Italy. Eagle Pictures is also the exclusive distributor of Paramount Pictures in Italy. In the same time, Tarak Ben Ammar with Eagle Pictures, has announced the building of a new film studio in Rome. Tarak Ben Ammar has built a media company operating in France, Italy, Tunisia, UK, and in the USA, it has partnerships with famous US companies such as Sony Pictures, Paramount Pictures, Warner Bros and Lionsgate.

== Private life ==
Tarak Ben Ammar is the son of Mondher Ben Ammar, Tunisian lawyer, politician and diplomat, and Corsican mother Simone Gaggeri. He is the brother of writer Hélé Béji. His aunt Wassila Ben Ammar was the First Lady of Tunisia as the wife of the first President of Tunisia, Habib Bourguiba. Tarak Ben Ammar has a first son, Jad Ben Amma r, film producer, and three children from his marriage to Polish actress Beata (born Sonczuk), Neil, Tarak Jr. and his model-singer daughter Sonia Ben Ammar (Sonia Ammar).

== Filmography ==
=== Producer ===
- 1976: Death Rite (French: Les Magiciens) by Claude Chabrol
- 1977: Jesus of Nazareth by Franco Zeffirelli (TV series)
- 1979:
  - Il ladrone (a.k.a. The Good Thief, French: Le Larron) by Pasquale Festa Campanile
  - The Adolescent (French: L'Adolescente) by Jeanne Moreau
- 1981: Tais-toi quand tu parles by Philippe Clair
- 1982:
  - La Traviata by Franco Zeffirelli
  - Deux heures moins le quart avant Jésus-Christ by Jean Yanne
  - Plus beau que moi, tu meurs by Philippe Clair
- 1984:
  - Les Cavaliers de l'orage by Gérard Vergez
  - Par où t'es rentré? On t'a pas vu sortir by Philippe Clair
  - Misunderstood by Jerry Schatzberg
- 1985:
  - Bras de fer by Gérard Vergez
  - A.D. (miniseries) by Stuart Cooper
- 1986: Pirates by Roman Polanski
- 1988: Young Toscanini (Italian: Il giovane Toscanini) by Franco Zeffirelli
- 1989: Bille en tête by Carlo Cotti
- 1991:
  - L'Autre by Bernard Giraudeau
  - Mayrig by Henri Verneuil
- 1992: Sand Screens (French: Écrans de sable) by Randa Chahal Sabbagh
- 1994:
  - Voyage by John Mackenzie
  - Foreign Student by Eva Sereny
- 2001: The Knights of the Quest (Italian: I cavalieri che fecero l'impresa) by Pupi Avati
- 2002:
  - Boys on the Run by Pol Cruchten
  - Femme fatale by Brian De Palma
  - Avenging Angelo (a.k.a. Mafia Love) by Martyn Burke
  - Ballistic by Wych Kaosayananda
- 2005: Chromophobia by Martha Fiennes
- 2007:
  - Hannibal Rising by Peter Webber
  - The Last Legion by Doug Lefler
  - Virgin Territory (a.k.a. Medieval Pie: Territoires Vierges, Decameron Pie) by David Leland
- 2009: Baarìa by Giuseppe Tornatore
- 2011: Black gold by Jean-Jacques Annaud
- 2014: Autómata by Gabe Ibáñez

=== Executive Producer ===
- 1979: Monty Python's Life of Brian by Terry Jones
- 1980: Rodriguez au pays des merguez by Philippe Clair
- 1983: Le Grand Carnaval by Alexandre Arcady
- 1984: Les Morfalous by Henri Verneuil
- 2022: Lyle, Lyle, Crocodile by Josh Gordon and Will Speck

=== Distributor ===
- 2002: City by the Sea by Michael Caton-Jones
- 2005: Quartier VIP by Laurent Firode
