= Marthe Villalonga =

French actress (born 1932)

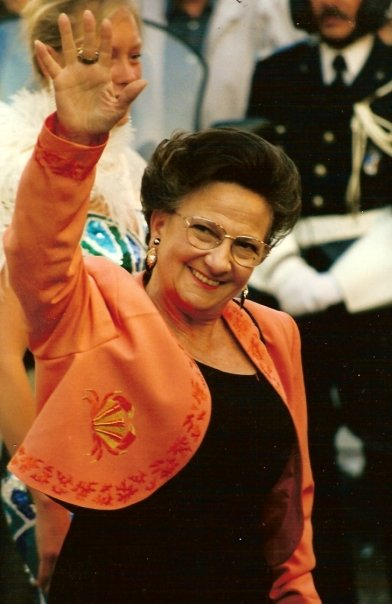
- Marthe Villalonga at the Cannes Film Festival
- Born: Marthe Sylvia Gilda Marie Thérèse Villalonga; 20 March 1932 (age 94); Bordj El Kiffan, Algeria
- Occupations: Actress, Comedian
- Years active: 1958–present

Marthe Villalonga (born 20 March 1932) is a French actress. She was born in Fort-de-l'Eau, Algeria.

== Theatre ==
Year	Title	Author	Director	Notes
1958-60	La Famille Hernandez	Geneviève Baïlac	Geneviève Baïlac	Théâtre du Gymnase Marie Bell
1961	Boulevard Durand	Armand Salacrou	André Reybaz	Théâtre Sarah Bernhardt
1962	Les Femmes de bonne humeur	Carlo Goldoni	André Reybaz (2)	Comédie de Paris
1965	Les Barbares	Jacques Bedos	Frédéric Valmain	Théâtre Charles de Rochefort
1965	Je veux voir Mioussov	Valentin Kataiev	Jacques Fabbri	Théâtre des Nouveautés
1970	Le Plombier de Tel Aviv	Ephraim Kishon	Gilbert Chikly	Théâtre des Nouveautés
1972	Measure for Measure	William Shakespeare	Jaromir Knittl	Festival du Marais
1972	En avant... toute !	Michel André	Michel Roux	Théâtre Édouard VII
1973	La Royale Performance	Marcel Mithois	Jean-Pierre Delage	Théâtre des Bouffes-Parisiens
1983-84	How to Be a Jewish Mother	Dan Greenburg	Tooti Masson	Théâtre Montparnasse
1986	Selon toute ressemblance	Denise Chalem	Denise Chalem	Théâtre de la Gaîté-Montparnasse
1990	Coiffure pour dames	Robert Harling	Stéphane Hillel	Théâtre de la Gaîté-Montparnasse
1993	Silence en coulisses !	Michael Frayn	Jean-Luc Moreau	Théâtre du Palais-Royal
1995	Croque-monsieur	Marcel Mithois	Raymond Acquaviva	Théâtre Daunou
2001	Soins intensifs	Françoise Dorin	Michel Roux (2)	Théâtre Saint-Georges
2006	Elle nous enterrera tous...	Jean Franco	Jean-Luc Moreau (2)	
2008	Tailleur pour dames	Georges Feydeau	Bernard Murat	Théâtre Édouard VII
2010	Le Mal de mère	Pierre-Olivier Scotto	Isabelle Rattier	
2012	Croque-monsieur	Marcel Mithois	Didier Caron	
2012-14	Ensemble et séparément	Françoise Dorin	Stéphane Hillel (2)	Théâtre des Champs-Élysées

== Filmography ==
Year	Title	Role	Director	Notes
1963	Janique aimée	Marie-Berthe	Jean-Pierre Desagnat	TV series
1964	Les Cinq Dernières Minutes	The Maid	Claude Loursais	TV series (1 episode)
1965	Déclic et des claques	Madame Nino	Philippe Clair	
1965	Les Cinq Dernières Minutes	The Nurse	Claude Loursais (2)	TV series (1 episode)
1965	Marc et Sylvie		Paul-Robin Banhaïoun	TV series (1 episode)
1966	Les saintes chéries	Madame Sanchez	Nicole de Buron	TV series (1 episode)
1966	L'âge heureux	The Concierge	Philippe Agostini	TV series (1 episode)
1969	Agence Intérim	The Woman	Marcel Moussy	TV series (1 episode)
1969	Au théâtre ce soir	Rosa	Pierre Sabbagh	TV series (1 episode)
1970	Le clair de terre	Gaby Garcia	Guy Gilles	
1971	Fantasia chez les ploucs	Gas Station Attendant	Gérard Pirès	
1971	Mourir d'aimer	The Social Worker	André Cayatte	
1971	La belle aventure	Jeantine	Jean Vernier	TV movie
1971	Le miroir 2000	Toinette Lauzon	François Villiers & Jean Couturier	TV series (11 episodes)
1972	Sweet Deception	The Good Spanish	Édouard Molinaro	
1972	Les chemins de pierre		Joseph Drimal	TV series (1 episode)
1973	Il n'y a pas de fumée sans feu		André Cayatte (2)	
1973	Quelques messieurs trop tranquilles	Gas Station Attendant	Georges Lautner	
1974	Verdict	The Concierge	André Cayatte (3)	
1974	Impossible Is Not French		Robert Lamoureux	
1974	Le colchique et l'étoile	The Merchant	Michel Subiela	TV movie
1974	Les dossiers du professeur Morgan	The Woman	Jacques Audoir	TV series (1 episode)
1975	Amigo	Inès	Philippe Joulia	TV movie
1976	Calmos	An Employee	Bertrand Blier	
1976	Dracula and Son	The Subway's Woman	Edouard Molinaro (2)	
1976	Pardon Mon Affaire	Mouchy Messina	Yves Robert	
1976	Attention les yeux !	The Neighbor	Gérard Pirès (2)	
1976	Le comédien	The Dresser	Jeannette Hubert	TV movie
1976	La poupée sanglante	The Barmaid	Marcel Cravenne	TV mini-series
1977	Pardon Mon Affaire, Too!	Mouchy Messina	Yves Robert (2)	
1977	Peppermint Soda	The English Teacher	Diane Kurys	
1977	Moi, fleur bleue	Madame Passemard	Eric Le Hung	
1977	À chacun son enfer		André Cayatte (4)	
1978	Le sucre	Madame Karbaoui	Jacques Rouffio	
1978	Va voir maman, papa travaille	Madame Clary	François Leterrier	
1978	Dirty Dreamer	Madame Taupin	Jean-Marie Périer	
1978	Le dernier amant romantique		Just Jaeckin	
1978	L'amour en question	The Maid	André Cayatte (5)	
1978	Vas-y maman		Nicole de Buron (2)	
1978	Les ringards	Albina	Robert Pouret	
1978	L'ange gardien	Madame Roussel	Jacques Fournier	
1978	Le vent sur la maison	Madame Baudry	Franck Apprederis	TV movie
1978	Les héritiers	Léontine	Marcel Moussy (2)	TV series (1 episode)
1978	Au théâtre ce soir	Concetta	Pierre Sabbagh (2)	TV series (1 episode)
1979	Le coup de sirocco	Marguerite Narboni	Alexandre Arcady	
1979	Gros-Câlin	Madame Astrid	Jean-Pierre Rawson	
1979	Les joyeuses colonies de vacances	Madame Bauchu	Michel Gérard	
1979	Les enquêtes du commissaire Maigret	Madame Beausoleil	Yves Allégret	TV series (1 episode)
1980	The Big Red One	Madame Marbaise	Samuel Fuller	
1980	Inspector Blunder	Marthe Clément	Claude Zidi	
1980	Cherchez l'erreur	Maria	Serge Korber	
1980	Un amour d'emmerdeuse	The Grandmother	Alain Vandercoille	
1980	Petit déjeuner compris	The Cleansing	Michel Berny	TV mini-series
1981	Les Uns et les Autres	Édith's Grandmother	Claude Lelouch	
1981	Si ma gueule vous plaît...	The Blackfoot Woman	Michel Caputo	
1981	Anthelme Collet ou Le brigand gentillhomme	Madame Alfieri	Jean-Paul Carrère	TV mini-series
1981	Caméra une première	Yvette	Bernard Saint-Jacques	TV series (1 episode)
1982	T'es folle ou quoi?	Madame Deprelet	Michel Gérard (2)	
1982	Salut... j'arrive !	The Concierge	Gérard Poteau	
1982	La baraka	Madame Prado	Jean Valère	
1982	Les sept jours du marié	Antoine's Mother	Serge Moati	TV movie
1982	Les enquêtes du commissaire Maigret	Sultana	Jean-Jacques Goron	TV series (1 episode)
1983	Banzaï	Madame Bernardin	Claude Zidi (2)	
1983	Le grand carnaval	Simone Castelli	Alexandre Arcady (2)	
1983	Le nez à la fenêtre	Violette	Jean-Claude Charnay	TV movie
1983	Père Noël et fils		André Flédérick	TV movie
1984	Thieves After Dark	The Concierge	Samuel Fuller (2)	
1984	How did you get in? We didn't see you leave	Nadège de Courtaboeuf	Philippe Clair (2)	
1984	L'erreur est humaine	The Woman	André Valardy	Short
1984	Tu peux toujours faire tes bagages	The Owner	Jacques Krier	TV movie
1984	Cinéma 16	Solange	Bernard Bouthier	TV series (1 episode)
1985	Three Men and a Cradle	Antoinette	Coline Serreau	
1985	Pizzaiolo et Mozzarel	Carlo's Mother	Christian Gion	
1985	Flash back	Marthe	Olivier Nolin	
1985-91	Maguy	Rose Plouhannec	Several	TV series (5 episodes)
1986	Cinéma 16	Madame Duroc	François Dupont-Midi	TV series (1 episode)
1987	Les Innocents	Hotel's Owner	André Téchiné	
1987	La calanque	Agnès Cambalette	Jean Canolle	TV series
1989	L'union sacrée	Blanche Atlan	Alexandre Arcady (3)	
1989	Le bateau bar		Frédéric Tanguy	Short
1989	Les Aventures de Franck et Foo-Yang		Jean-Louis Bertucelli	TV mini-series
1991	Kaddish	The Woman	Serge Zeitoun	Short
1992	Les mamies	Suzon	Annick Lanoë	
1992	Le fauteuil magique	The Woman	André Valardy (2)	Short
1992	Coiffure pour dames	Anita	Michel Treguer	TV movie
1993	My Favorite Season	Berthe	André Téchiné (2)	Nominated - César Award for Best Supporting Actress
1997	L'autre côté de la mer	Marinette	Dominique Cabrera	
1997	Parisien tête de chien	Madame Billot	Christiane Spiero	TV movie
1998	Alice and Martin	Lucie Sauvagnac	André Téchiné (3)	
1998	La femme du veuf	Odette	Michel Favart	TV movie
1999	Superlove	Mamie Doradée	Jean-Claude Janer	
1999	Tramontane	Colette	Henri Helman	TV mini-series
1999-2001	Docteur Sylvestre	Hélène Danton	Several	TV series (11 episodes)
2001	The Milk of Human Kindness	Marthe	Dominique Cabrera (2)	Locarno International Film Festival - Best Ensemble
2001	Judicaël	Véra Perlman	Claude d'Anna	TV movie
2001	Le divin enfant	Mamitta	Stéphane Clavier	TV movie
2003	Lovely Rita, sainte patronne des cas désespérés	Renée	Stéphane Clavier (2)	
2003	Nés de la mère du monde	Odette Sidowski	Denise Chalem	TV movie Monte-Carlo Television Festival - Outstanding Performance - Female
2004	Les Dalton	Ma Dalton	Philippe Haïm	
2004	Au secours, j'ai 30 ans !	Jeanne-Marie	Marie-Anne Chazel	
2005	Rue des figuiers	Madame Farruggia	Yasmina Yahiaoui	TV movie
2006	Hey Good Looking!	Liliane	Lisa Azuelos	
2009	Kaamelott	Nonna	Alexandre Astier	TV series (3 episodes)
2011	Las olas		Alberto Morais	
2011	Doc Martin	Muriel Lecomte	Stéphane Clavier (3)	TV series (1 episode)
2012	Nous York	Suzanne Hazan	Hervé Mimran & Géraldine Nakache	
2012	La loi de mon pays	Mémé Sema	Dominique Ladoge	TV movie
2013	Turf	Madame Garcia	Fabien Onteniente	
2013	Fais pas ci, fais pas ça	Mémé du Gers	Jérôme Navarro	TV series (1 episode)
2013	Y'a pas d'âge	Brigitte Martini	Several	TV series (28 episodes)
2014	Supercondriaque	Dimitri's Mother	Dany Boon	
2015	The Final Lesson	Madeleine	Pascale Pouzadoux	
2015	Les pins célestes	Marta Villeneuve	Rémi K. Chevalier	Short
2015	Scènes de ménages	Theresa	Francis Duquet	TV series (1 episode)
2015	Nos chers voisins	Florence Balard	Emmanuel Rigaut	TV series (1 episode)
2018	Brillantissime		Michèle Laroque	

== Duanju ==
2018-2025 : King Gandolfi by Guillaume Sanjorge : Queen Gandolfi
