= Wassila Bourguiba =

Wife of Tunisian President Habib Bourguiba

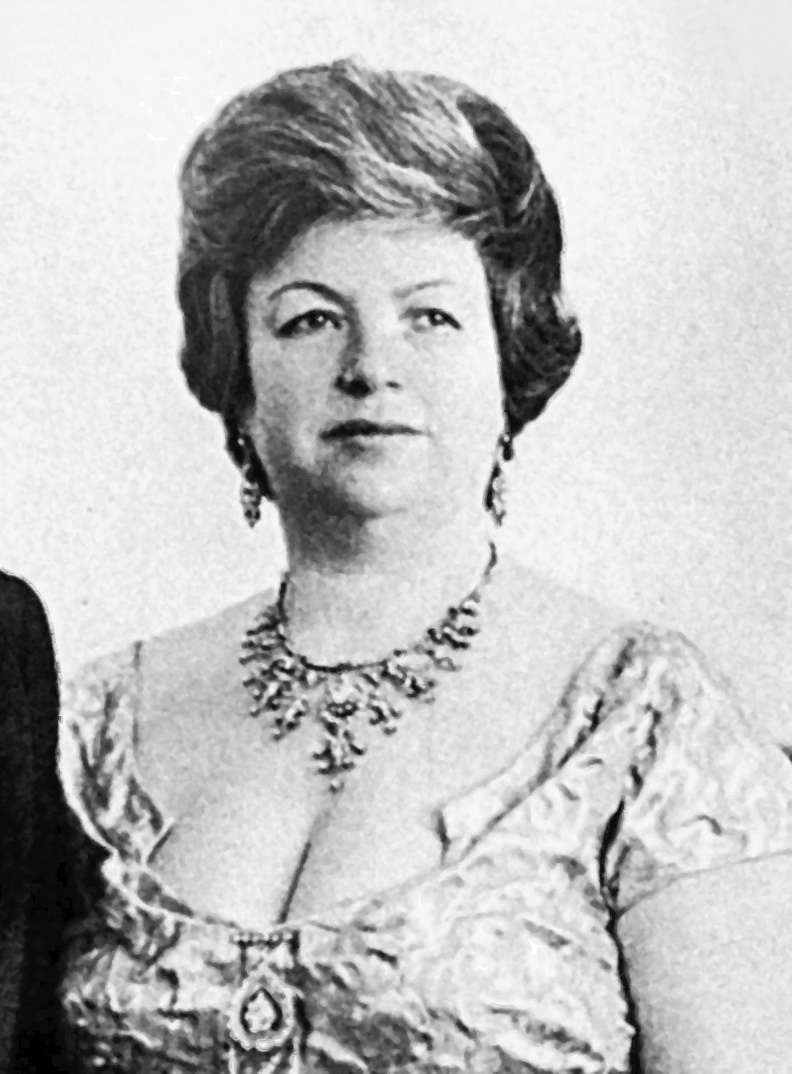
- Wassila Bourguiba in 1962

First Lady of Tunisia
- In office 12 April 1962 – 11 August 1986
- President: Habib Bourguiba
- Preceded by: Moufida Bourguiba
- Succeeded by: Naïma Ben Ali

Personal details
- Born: Wassila Ben Ammar; April 22, 1912 Béja, French Tunisia
- Died: June 22, 1999 (aged 87) La Marsa, Tunisia
- Spouse: Habib Bourguiba (m. 1962; div. 1986)

Wassila Ben Ammar Bourguiba (Arabic: وسيلة بن عمار بورقية; née Ben Ammar; April 22, 1912 – June 22, 1999) was the second wife of Tunisian president Habib Bourguiba and thus the First Lady of Tunisia from 1962 until 1986. She was nicknamed Majda ("Venerable").

== Biography ==
=== Family, youth and marriage ===
Ben Ammar's father, lawyer Wassila Ben Ammar belonged to a prominent family from El Kef. Her father, Mohamed Ben Hussein Ben Othman El Haj Ali Ben Ammar, was a lawyer in the Sharia courts. Wassila studied until she obtained her primary school certificate, then enrolled in secondary school, but she soon dropped out. She then married Ali Chadhli, one of the wealthy men of El Kef, and had a daughter with him named Nabila. belonged to a relatively impoverished Tunisian bourgeois family previously composed of senior officials and large landowners. Her mother, Fatma Dellagi, also came from the Tunisian bourgeoisie.

Wassila met Bourguiba for the first time on 12 April 1943, when she came to congratulate him on his release after five years of detention. "It was love at first sight", wrote Habib Bourguiba in his autobiography Ma vie, mon œuvre (French: "My Life, My Work"). Wassila at that time already had a daughter by a small landowner.

Through her budding relationship with Bourguiba, she had a considerable influence over the abolition of the monarchy of the Bey of Tunis and promoted the proclamation of a republic on 25 July 1957. After this, she strongly supported Ahmed Ben Salah, who was appointed on 29 July 1957 as Secretary of State for Public Health and Social Affairs, a minister-equivalent role.

Habib Bourguiba married Wassila on 12 April 1962, about a year after his divorce from Moufida Bourguiba on 21 July 1961. The son of Habib Bourguiba and Moufida, Habib Bourguiba Jr., showed a certain animosity toward his stepmother. Since she was from a family of the traditional Tunisian bourgeoisie, which included influential and rich men, some of the ministers from Tunis saw this marriage as a way to detach Bourguiba from the ministers of the Tunisian Sahel from which Ben Salah originated. Indeed, her support for the latter did not last when he started gaining power.

=== First Lady ===
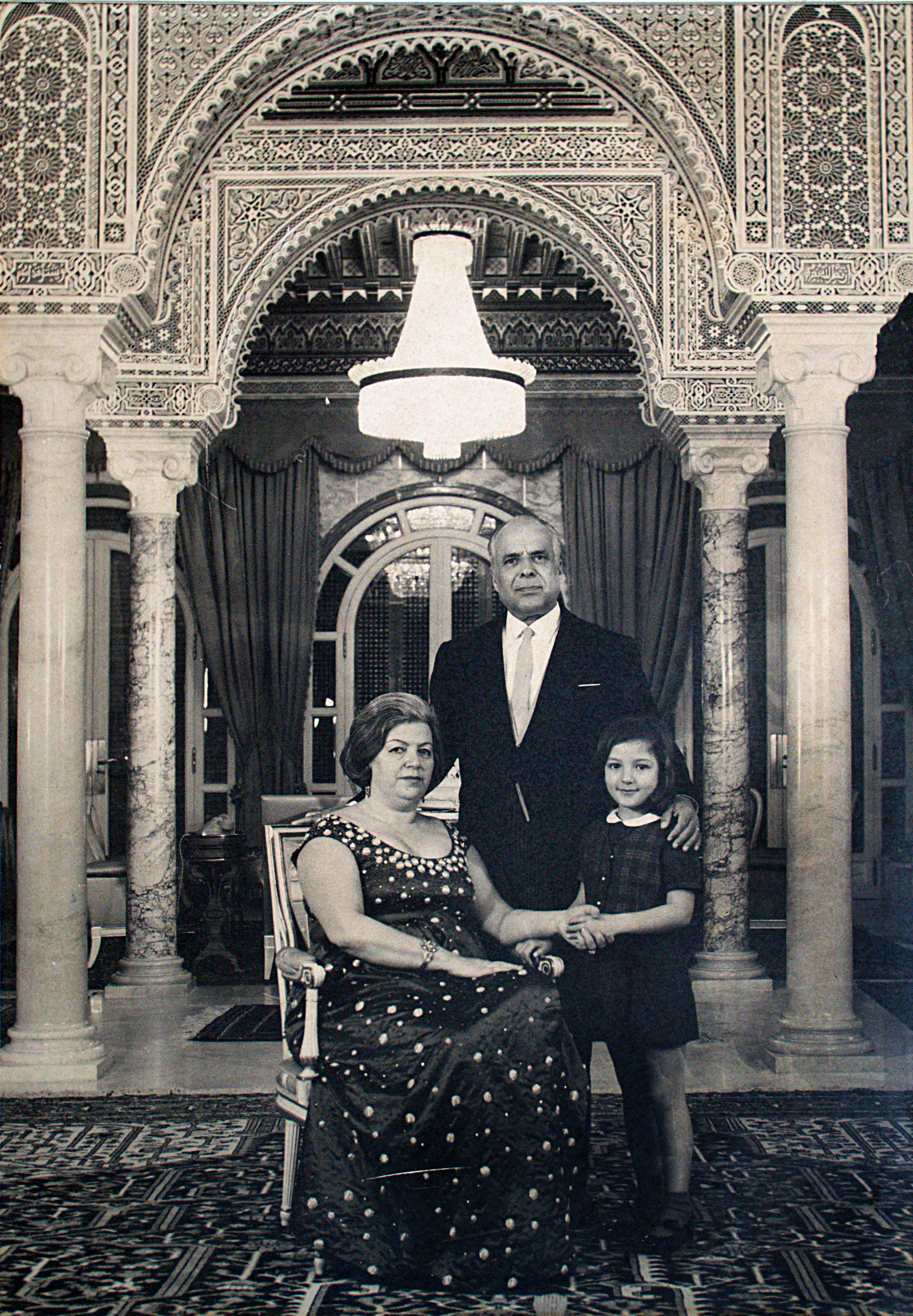
Wassila, Bourguiba and their adopted daughter Hajer in Carthage Palace in 1966.

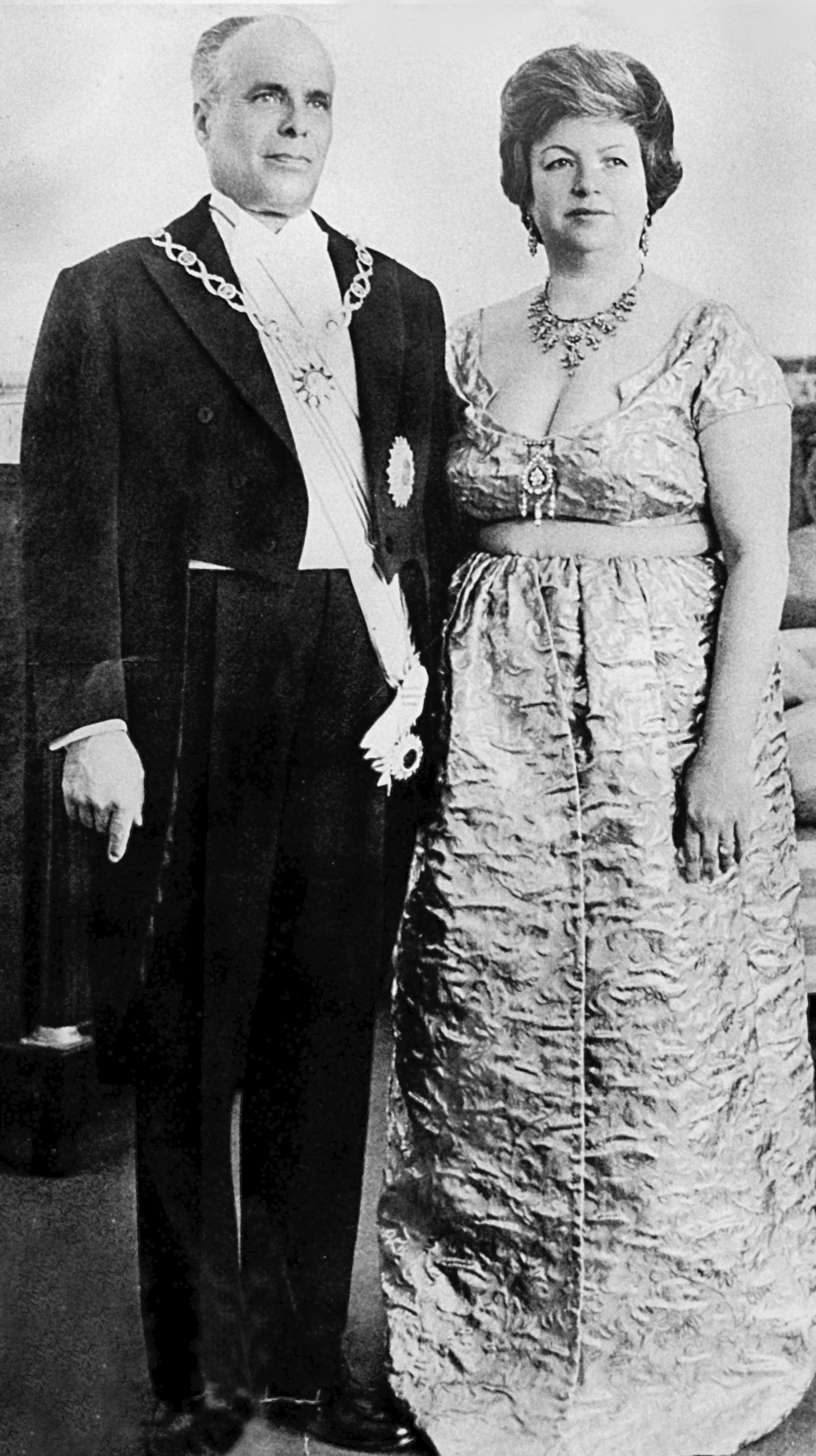
Habib and Wassila Bourguiba at their marriage ceremony in 1962.

In 1980, at the time of the attack against the city of Gafsa by an Arab nationalist commando, she acted to appoint Driss Guiga as Interior Minister and Mohammad Mzali as Prime Minister, while Mohamed Sayah was rather more in favour. She also named some of her friends in government positions. For the parliamentary elections on 1 November 1981, the first multi-party elections since independence, she supported the falsification of results to undermine the opposition victory, represented particularly by the Movement of Socialist Democrats Ahmed Mestiri. She was also the main architect of the installation of the Palestine Liberation Organization and its leader Yasser Arafat in Tunis following their evacuation from Beirut in 1982. Bourguiba, aging and ailing, gave her more and more responsibilities in state affairs. Wassila was "permanently connected to telephone conversations."

=== End of life ===
Later, Wassila moved to Paris. Following her former husband's dismissal on 7 November 1987, the Tunisian press announced that she had sent the new president Zine El Abidine Ben Ali a message "expressing her confidence in the new political leadership" and "satisfaction with the rendered respects to the former president". After two and a half years of absence, she returned to Tunisia in July 1988. She died on 22 June 1999 and, unlike the president's first wife, she was not buried in the Bourguiba mausoleum in Monastir.

She is the aunt of Tunisian-French film producer and distributor Tarak Ben Ammar, and the grandmother of Yasmine Tordjman-Besson who became the second wife of the French Minister Eric Besson. Her grandniece (Taraks's daughter) is a model-singer Sonia Ben Ammar, who was born four months prior to her death.

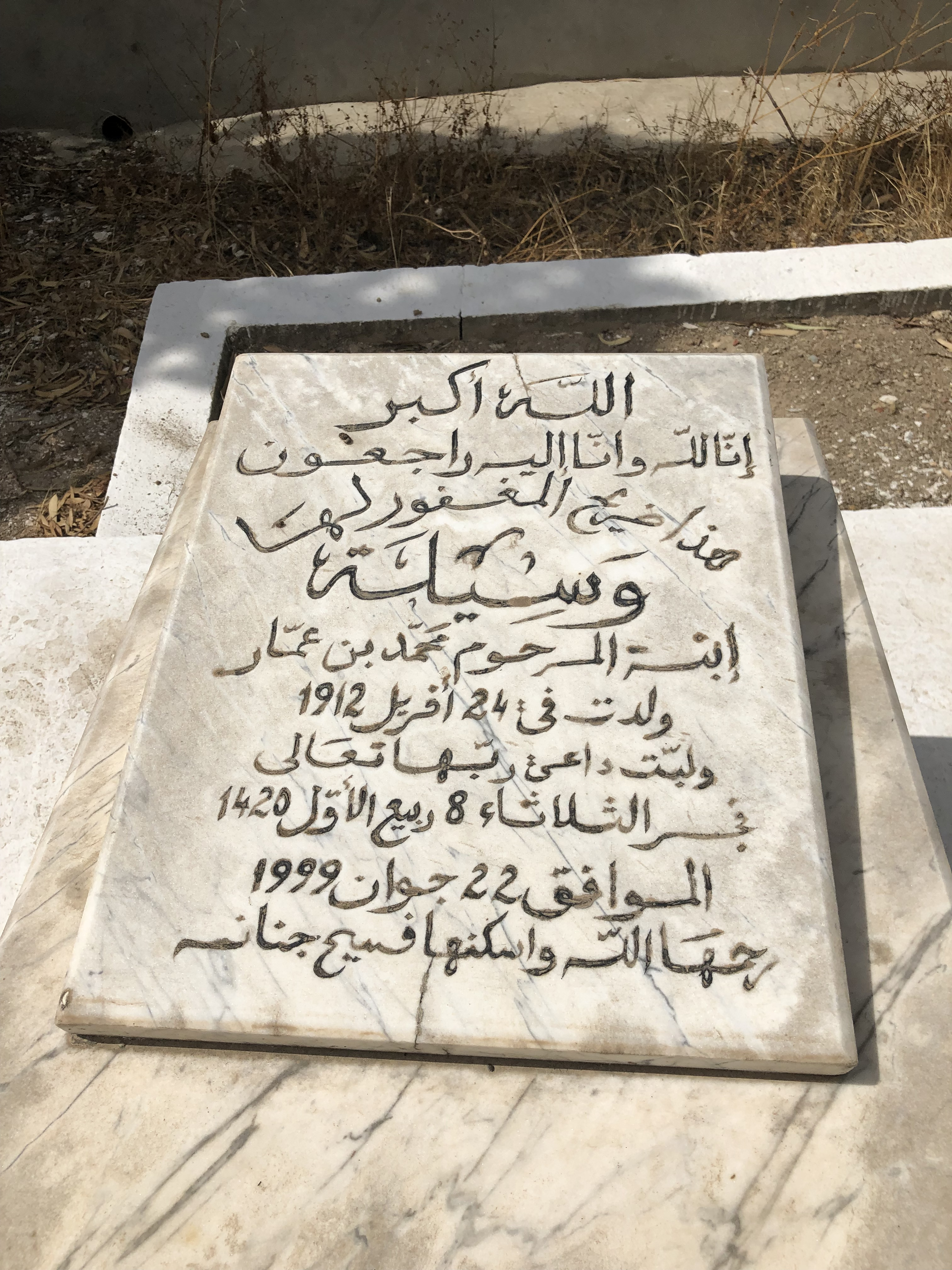
Tomb of Wassila Bourguiba

Honorary titles
Preceded by Moufida Bourguiba	First Lady of Tunisia; 1962–1986	Succeeded by Naïma Ben Ali
