= Par où t'es rentré? On t'a pas vu sortir =

- Theatrical release poster
- Directed by: Philippe Clair
- Written by: Philippe Clair
- Produced by: Tarak Ben Ammar
- Starring: Jerry Lewis; Philippe Clair; Marthe Villalonga
- Cinematography: André Domage
- Edited by: Françoise Javet-Frédérix
- Music by: Alan Silvestri
- Distributed by: Gaumont Distribution
- Release date: 19 November 1984 (France)
- Running time: 96 minutes
- Country: France
- Languages: French; English
- Box office: 823,230 admissions (France)

Par où t'es rentré? On t'a pas vu sortir is a 1984 French comedy film starring Jerry Lewis and Connie Nielsen. It was filmed and released in 1984 in France by Gaumont Distribution.

== Plot ==
Clovis Blaireau is a private detective who is hired to spy on the cheating husband by his wife.

Although Clovis fails to gain any evidence that he is cheating, he does wind up becoming friends with the husband. The two new friends get involved with mobsters and they flee to Tunisia. Once there they are mistaken for mobsters, themselves, and get mixed up in a fast-food empire war. Eventually they straighten everything out and open a restaurant together, a combination American Fast Food and Oriental Slow Food establishment.

== Cast ==
- Jerry Lewis as Clovis Blaireau
- Philippe Clair as Prosper de Courtaboeuf
- Marthe Villalonga as Nadège de Courtaboeuf / Rosette Cioccolini
- Jackie Sardou as Pauline, la mère de Clovis
- Connie Nielsen as Eva (credited as Connie Nielson)

== Release ==
This was one of two films that Lewis made in the 1980s strictly for European release. They have never been released in the US, although it was given a tentative US release title: How Did You Get In? We Didn't See You Leave.

Lewis, speaking about this film and Retenez Moi...Ou Je Fais Un Malheur, said that "as long as I have control [over distribution], you'll never see them in this country [United States]".
