= Déclic et des claques =

- Directed by: Philippe Clair
- Written by: Philippe Clair, André Nader
- Cinematography: Jean Malige
- Edited by: Jean-Michel Gautier
- Music by: Raymond Lefèvre
- Release date: 1965
- Running time: 84 minutes
- Countries: Italy, France
- Language: French

Déclic et des claques is a 1965 Italian and French film directed by Philippe Clair.

== Cast ==
- Annie Girardot ... Sandra
- Mike Marshall ... Vivi
- Philippe Clair ... Jean-Philippe
- Georges Blaness ... Georges (as Georges Blanes)
- André Nader ... Ferdinand
- Robert Gadel ... Bobby
- Muriel Baptiste ... Pistache
- Carla Marlier ... Alexandra
- Pierre Doris ... Philippe
- Marthe Villalonga ... Madame Nino
- Renée Saint-Cyr ... Ferdinand's mother
- Enrico Macias ... as himself
- Darry Cowl ... a guest
- Lucien Layani
- Jean Gras
