= Sonia Ben Ammar =

French model, singer, and actress

- Born: 19 February 1999 (age 27); Paris, France
- Education: University of Southern California; Berklee College of Music (BMus)
- Occupations: Model; singer; actress
- Years active: 2012–present
- Spouse: Rocco Basilico (married 2025-present)
- Father: Tarak Ben Ammar
- Relatives: Wassila Ben Ammar (paternal great-aunt); Habib Bourguiba (paternal great-uncle)

Sonia Ben Ammar (born 19 February 1999), also credited as Sonia Ammar, is a French and Tunisian model, singer, and actress, who is signed with IMG Models. She has appeared on several magazine covers, including Vanity Fair and L'Officiel.

Ben Ammar released her debut extended play Sonia (2019) to positive reviews from critics. She played the role of Liv McKenzie in the slasher film Scream (2022), which was a critical and commercial success.

== Early life ==
Sonia Ben Ammar was born in Paris, France, on 19 February 1999. She is the daughter of a famous Tunisian film producer Tarak Ben Ammar and actress Beata Ammar (née Sonczuk). Her mother is of Polish descent, while her Tunisian-born father is of paternal Amazigh and maternal Corsican descent. He was raised Muslim; his own mother converted to Islam from Catholicism. Her paternal great-aunt (paternal grandfather's sister) Wassila Ben Ammar was the wife of the first President of Tunisia, Habib Bourguiba.

She graduated from the American School of Paris and started attending the University of Southern California in fall 2017 to study music.

== Career ==
In 2012, Ben Ammar made her acting debut in a role in the stage musical 1789: Les Amants de la Bastille. In 2013, she appeared in the film Jappeloup.

In 2016, she signed with IMG Models and has since modeled for Dolce & Gabbana, Miu Miu, Carolina Herrera, Topshop, Nina Ricci and Chanel. She has also appeared in magazines such as Vanity Fair, Harper's Bazaar Arabia, Love, and L'Officiel.

Ben Ammar made her musical debut as a featured artist in Petit Biscuit's song "Creation Come Alive" in 2017. Two years later, Ben Ammar released her debut single "Joyride", which served as the lead track of her debut extended play, Sonia, which was released in November 2019 and earned positive reviews from critics. Paper magazine wrote that she was "fitting nicely into the dark-pop scene" and went on to compare her to the likes of Halsey and Banks.

In September 2020, it was announced that Ben Ammar would star as Liv McKenzie in the fifth Scream feature film (2022), which was directed by Matt Bettinelli-Olpin and Tyler Gillett. To prepare for the role, she told Vogue Arabia that she "rewatched every interview and really got into my character. It's funny, I actually read the script so many times and knew everyone else's scenes by heart. This was an ongoing joke on-set." The film was released on 14 January 2022 to critical and commercial success.

Ben Ammar had a role in Megalopolis (2024), directed by Francis Ford Coppola.

== Personal life ==
In 2025, Ben Ammar married italian eyewear executive Rocco Basilico in Capri, Italy.

== Filmography ==
=== Film ===
Year	Title	Role	Notes
2013	Jappeloup	Raphaëlle Dalio (young)	
2022	Scream	Olivia "Liv" McKenzie	(Note: Ben Ammar also dubbed her role in the European French dubbing of the film.)
2023	The Equalizer 3	Chiara Bonucci	
2024	Megalopolis	Zena The Model	

=== Theater ===
Year	Production	Role	Location
2012–2013	1789: Les Amants de la Bastille	Ensemble / Charlotte	Palais des Sports

== Discography ==
=== Extended plays ===
Title	Details
Sonia	Released: 8 November 2019; Label: Self-released; Formats: Digital download, streaming

=== Singles ===
Title	Year	Album
"Joyride"	2019	Sonia
"Games"	2019	Sonia
"I Don't Know"	2019	Sonia

==== As featured artist ====
Title	Year	Album
"By My Side" (Black Atlass featuring Sonia Ben Ammar)	2020	Dream Awake

=== Other appearances ===
Title	Year	Album
"Creation Come Alive" (Petit Biscuit featuring Sonia Ben Ammar)	2017	Presence
