= Moufida Bourguiba =

Wife of former Tunisian president Habib Bourguiba

- مفيدة بورقيبة
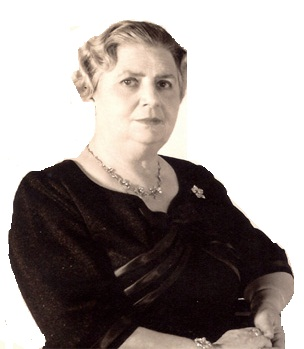

First Lady of Tunisia
- In office 25 July 1957 – 21 July 1961
- President: Habib Bourguiba
- Preceded by: Position created (Lalla Jeneïna Beya as Queen consort of Tunisia)
- Succeeded by: Wassila Bourguiba

Personal details
- Born: Mathilde Lorrain; January 24, 1890 Saint-Maur-des-Fossés, Val-de-Marne, Paris, Third French Republic
- Died: November 15, 1976 (aged 86) Monastir, Monastir Governorate, Tunisia
- Spouses: Colonel le Fras (died 1918); Habib Bourguiba (m. 1927; div. 1961)
- Children: Habib Bourguiba, Jr.

Moufida Bourguiba (Arabic: مفيدة بورقيبة; née Mathilde Lorrain 24 January 1890 – 15 November 1976) was the first wife of Habib Bourguiba, the first President of Tunisia, and thus the inaugural First Lady of Tunisia from 1957 to 1961.

== Biography ==
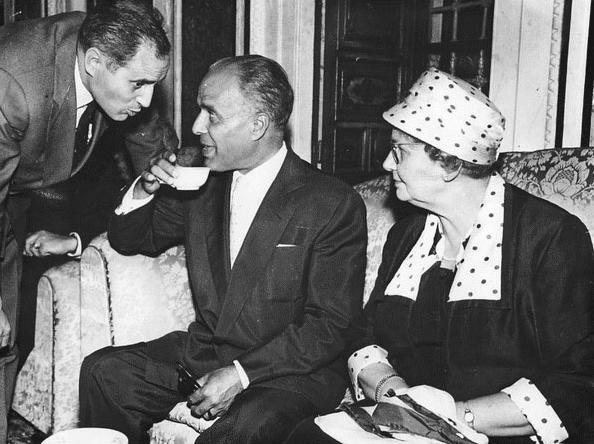
Moufida, Habib and Habib Jr. in 1956.

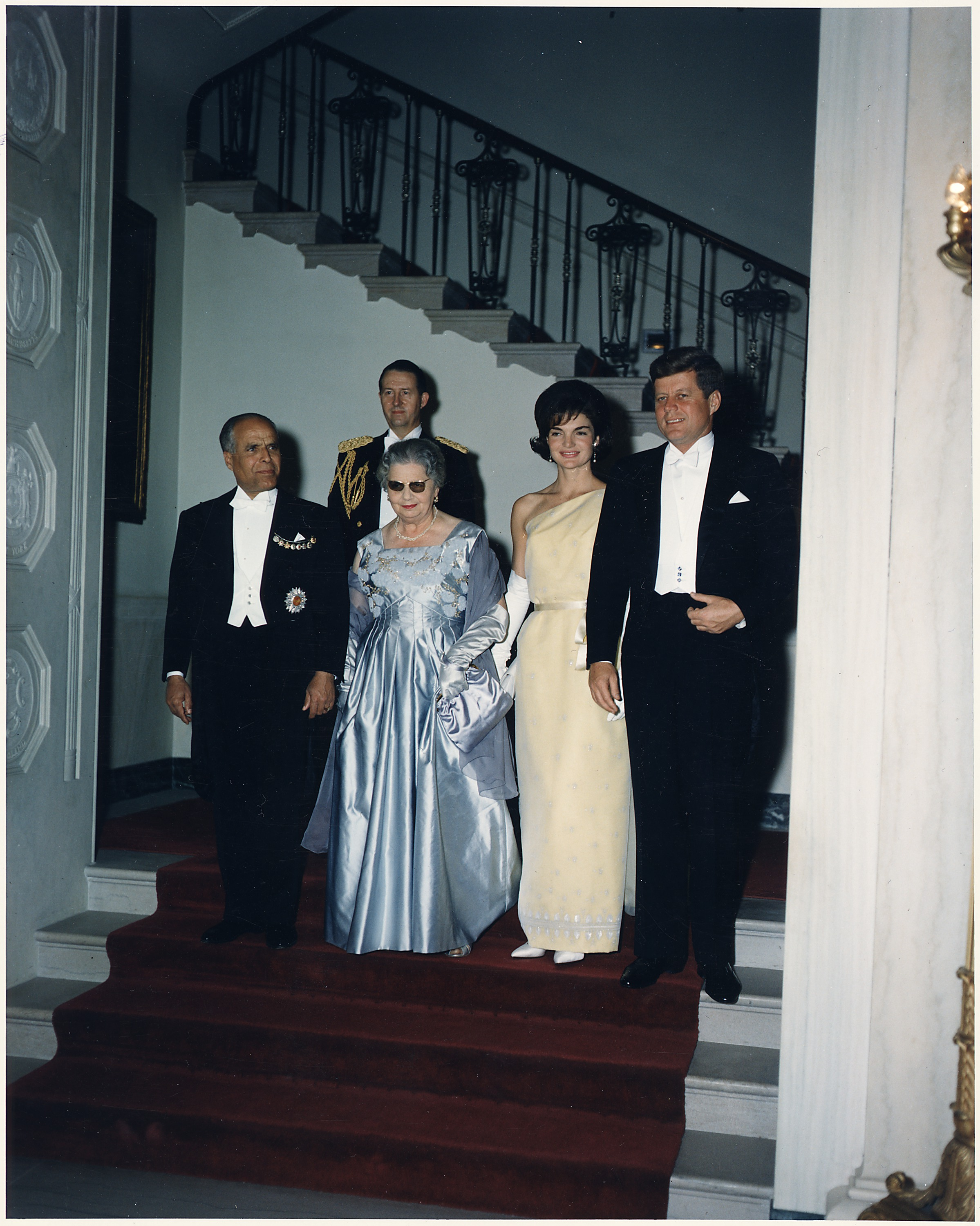
Habib and Moufida Bourguiba on a visit to the White House in 1961 with John and Jacqueline Kennedy.

Mathilde Lorrain was born in France in 1890 in Saint-Maur-des-Fossés, Val-de-Marne. She married a French officer, Colonel le Fras who was killed at the very end of the First World War on 11 November 1918. She met Habib Bourguiba in 1925 whilst he was studying law at the University of Paris. Their only son, also Habib, was born in April 1927 and they married that year.

She was with her husband in 1956 as part of the delegation as Tunisia took its seat at the United Nations. Notably a woman diplomat was with the party which was seen as novel for Tunisia.

After independence she converted to Islam and took the name "Moufida" on 25 October 1958. Her husband awarded her with a number of honours but she is claimed to have said that she only did things for him and his country.

The couple divorced in 1961. She died in Monastir in 1976. Her husband remarried to Wassila Ben Ammar.

Honorary titles
Preceded by Lalla Jeneïna Beya (as Queen consort of Tunisia)	First Lady of Tunisia; 1957–1961	Succeeded by Wassila Bourguiba
