= Habib Bourguiba Jr. =

Tunisian politician and diplomat (1927–2009)

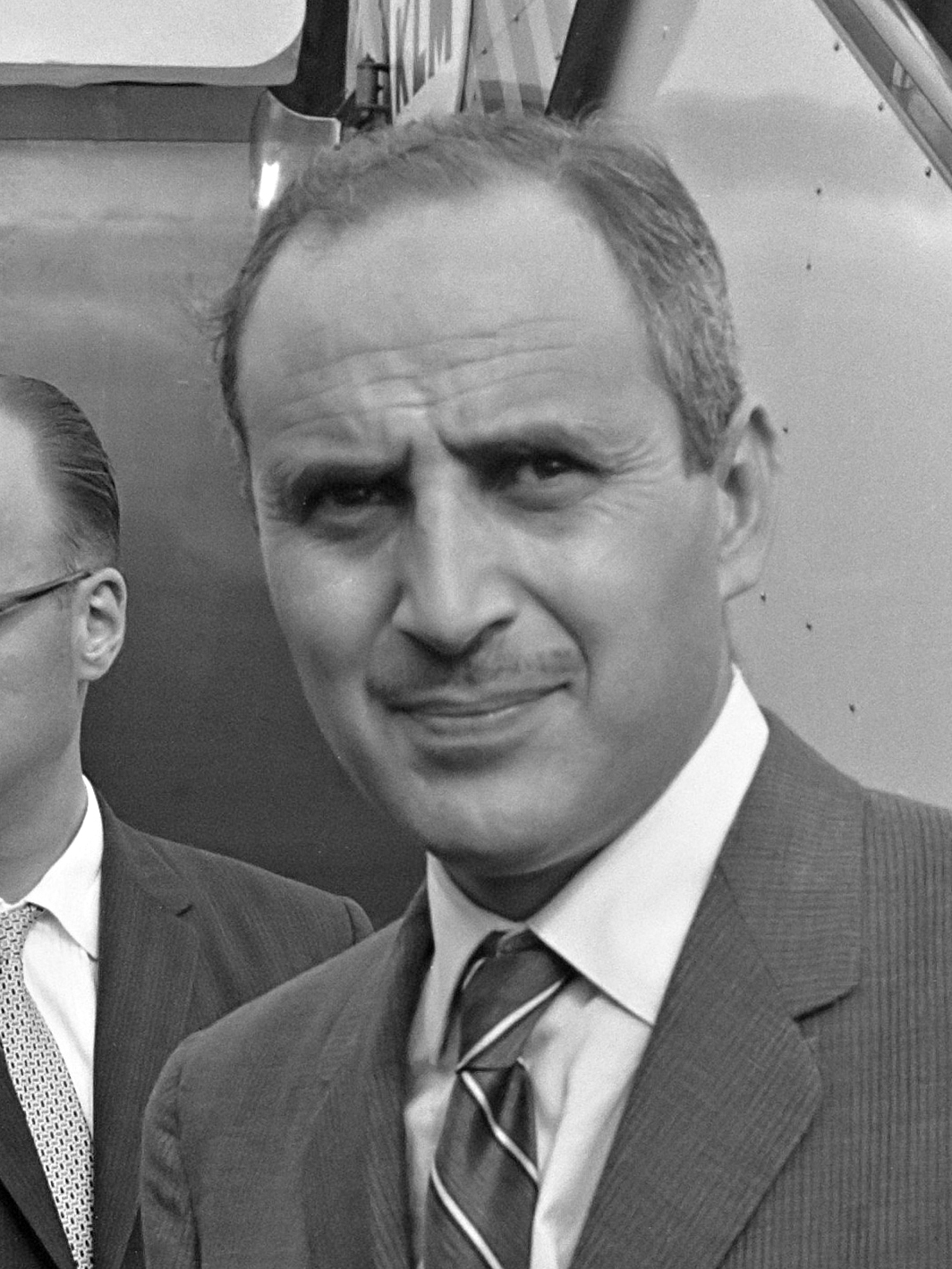
Habib Bourguiba Jr. in 1961

Habib Bourguiba Jr. (Arabic: الحبيب بورقيبة الابن, romanized: al-Ḥabīb Būrqībah al-Ibn; 9 April 1927 – 28 December 2009) was a Tunisian diplomat and politician.

== Biography ==
Jean-Claude Habib Bourguiba was the son of Habib Bourguiba, who became the first President of Tunisia in 1957, and of his first wife Mathilde Lorrain (later Moufida Bourguiba). He was appointed Tunisia's ambassador to France in November 1958. He later served as ambassador to the United States as well as Italy.

In 1964, Bourguiba replaced Mongi Slim as the minister of foreign affairs. He served in that post until 1970. He was attending King Hassan II of Morocco's birthday celebration on 10 July 1971 when M'hamed Ababou and Mohamed Medbouh launched a coup against the King. When a grenade landed at Hassan's feet, Bourguiba threw it back before it could detonate, probably saving the King's life.

Bourguiba founded the BIAT Banque with Mansour Moalla in 1976. Bourguiba subsequently served as the minister of justice until he was named by his father as a special counselor in 1977. He was removed from this office as part of the coup d'état on 7 November 1987 which overthrew his father's administration and brought Zine El Abidine Ben Ali to power.

He was a shareholder (2.3%) and board member of the BIAT Banque and member of the Club of Monaco which is an important organisation in Mediterranean countries.

== Personal life ==
Bourguiba married Neïla Zouiten, the daughter of Chedly Zouiten, who was the chairman of the Tunisian Football Club, Esperance de Tunis. They had three children:

- Mouezz Bourguiba (born March 14, 1956, in Tunis) married to Françoise Peignon and father of Amina Bourguiba (born 1985) and Aïcha Bourguiba (born 1989).
- Mahdi Bourguiba (born March 18, 1959 in France): married firstly to Sarrah Turky and secondly 1992 to Miriam Kristina Hayder and the father of Jenna Bourguiba (b. 1989), Eya Bourguiba (b. 1994), Neil Bourguiba (b. 1996) and Maya Bourguiba. Around the age of 10-11 years old, Neil played the part of Vilhelm Beck, grandson to the titular character Martin Beck in the Swedish crime drama movie series Beck.
- Meriem Bourguiba: married to Kais Laouiti, son of Allala Laouiti, former Private Secretary to President Bourguiba: mother of Leila Laouiti (born 1989), Youssef Laouiti (born 1990) and Sarah Laouiti (born 1995)

He died in 2009, aged 82.

Preceded by Mongi Slim	Minister of Foreign Affairs of Tunisia; 1964–1970	Succeeded by Mohamed Masmoudi
