= Philippe Clair =

French film director (1930–2020)

- Born: Charles Bensoussan; 14 September 1930; Ahfir, Morocco
- Died: 28 November 2020 (aged 90); Courbevoie, France
- Occupations: Actor, Director
- Years active: 1950–2013

Prosper Charles Bensoussan professionally known as Philippe Clair (14 September 1930 – 28 November 2020) was a Moroccan-French actor, director, producer, screenwriter, and popular humorist. Along with fellow French directors Max Pécas and Richard Balducci, his name is synonymous with the golden age of camp and low comedy in French cinema.

== Career ==
Philippe Clair moved to Paris in 1950 to study acting at the National Conservatory of Dramatic Arts of Paris. He won the Bernstein and College Stars awards, honors given to the best young Parisian actors. He performed on stage and television with major directors and writers in shows such as L'Affaire des poisons [Affair of the Poisons] directed by Raymond Rouleau, Une femme libre [A free woman] by Armand Salacrou, and Les Îles fortunées [The Prosperous Islands] by Simon Gantillon. Eventually he got a show of his own and became an important French humorist, mounting such works as the Judeo-Arabic Purée de nous z'otres [Mashed we z'otres], and Le Cid in Oued Bel [Parody of El Cid] based on the book by Edmond Brua. He specialized in improvisation and in writing comedy sketches.

In 1965 Clair directed his first film, Déclic et des claques [Clicks and Slaps] with Annie Girardot, the comic misadventures of a young pied-noir [French Algerian] in Paris. He continued his work as a singer: in 1967, his sketch Rien Nasser de courir which satirized the Six-Day War was banned because of its political overtones.

In 1970, Philippe Clair became the leading director of popular comedy. His humor usually had a French Algerian flavor. Most of his films were commercial successes, although sometimes they were panned by critics who called them vulgar or overacted. His films were often plagiarized by other directors with typical French disrespect or–as the French call it–franchouillards.

His 1971 film La Grande Java [Great Java] launched the comedy careers of the members of the French band Les Charlots. He went on to use band member Aldo Maccione in The Great Maffia, Plus beau que moi, tu meurs [More beautiful than me, you die], and Tais-toi quand tu parles! [Shut up when you talk]. He made several surreal films, such as Le Führer en folie [The Fuhrer Runs Amok], which featured Henri Tisot in the role of Adolf Hitler and in which Michel Galabru plays the role of a football referee. In 1984, he managed the greatest coup of his career by casting Jerry Lewis in the film Par où t'es rentré ? On t'a pas vu sortir [How Did You Get In? We Didn't See You Leave].

In 2013 journalist and filmmaker Gilles Botineau joined with Philippe Clair to produce a documentary portrait titled, Plus drôle que lui, tu meurs [Funnier than him, you die]. The film, lasting 55 minutes covered Clair's entire career, focusing especially on his vision of comedy. Clair retired in 1990 at the age of 60. However, he returned with a production he wrote in 2013 titled, Help, Philippe Clair returns.

== Reception ==
Philippe Clair was not always treated kindly by the critics. Critic John Tulard in the "Dictionary of French directors" said, "His work is incredibly stupid and vulgar". The weekly French magazineTélérama opined, "Every film by Philippe Clair is worse than the last, and yet it never stops".

In the 1980s Clair's style of popular comedy went out of favor in France and he stopped producing films. But critic Louis Skorecki maintained that the 1996 film La Vérité si je mens! [Would I Lie to You?], a classic Jewish-Algerian comedy, was simply a remake of Philippe Clair's first film, Click and slaps.

== Filmography ==
- 1962 Girl on the Road (dir. Jacqueline Audry), as Le motard #2
- 1965 Déclic et des claques (Clicks and Slaps)
- 1971 La Grande Java (The Great Java)
- 1971 La Grande Maffia (The Great Maffia)
- 1973 La Brigade en folie (The Mad Brigade)
- 1974 Le Führer en folie (The Führer Runs Amok)
- 1976 Le Grand Fanfaron (The Great Braggart)
- 1978 Comment se faire réformer (How to Reform)
- 1978 Les réformés se portent bien (The Reformers are Doing Well)
- 1979 Ces flics étranges venus d'ailleurs (Those Strange Cops From Elsewhere)
- 1980 Rodriguez au pays des merguez (Rodriguez in the Land of Merguez)
- 1981 Tais-toi quand tu parles (Shut Up When You Talk)
- 1982 Plus beau que moi, tu meurs (More Beautiful Than Me, You Die)
- 1984 Par où t'es rentré ? On t'a pas vu sortir (How Did You Get In? We Didn't See You Leave)
- 1986 Si t'as besoin de rien... fais-moi signe (If You Need Anything, Let Me Know)
- 1987 Si tu vas à Rio... tu meurs (If You Go to Rio ... You Die)
- 1990 L'Aventure extraordinaire d'un papa peu ordinaire (Extraordinary Adventure of an Ordinary Papa)
